= La Grande Béroche =

- Municipality
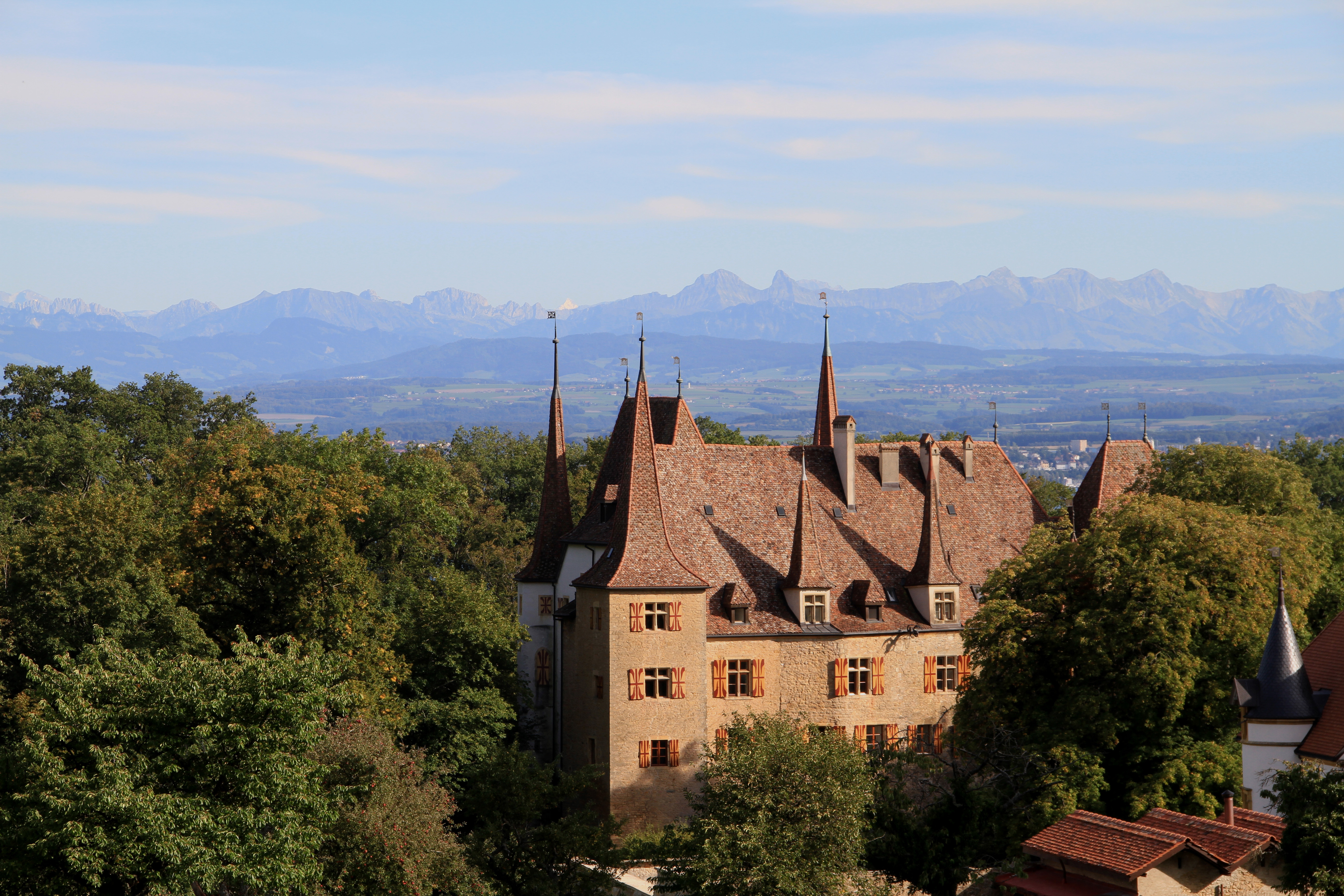
- Gorgier Castle above Gorgier village

- Coat of arms
- Location of La Grande Béroche
- Location within Switzerland Location within Canton of Neuchâtel
- Coordinates: 46°54′N 6°47′E
- Country: Switzerland
- Canton: Neuchâtel

Area
  - Total: 45.25 km^{2} (17.47 sq mi)

Population (December 2016)
  - Total: 9,064
  - Density: 200.3/km^{2} (518.8/sq mi)
- Time zone: UTC+01:00 (CET)
  - Summer (DST): UTC+02:00 (CEST)
- Postal code: 2022-24, 2027-28
- SFOS number: 6417
- ISO 3166 code: CH-NE
- Surrounded by: Autavaux (FR), Boudry, Estavayer-le-Lac (FR), Forel (FR), Noiraigue, Provence (VD), Saint-Aubin-Sauges, Travers
- Website: https://www.lagrandeberoche.ch/ SFSO statistics

La Grande Béroche is a municipality in the canton of Neuchâtel in Switzerland. On 1 January 2018 the former municipalities of Bevaix, Fresens, Gorgier, Montalchez, Saint-Aubin-Sauges and Vaumarcus merged to form the new municipality.

== History ==
=== Bevaix ===
Bevaix is first mentioned in 998 as in villa Bevacensi. In 1139 it was mentioned as Betuaci.

=== Fresens ===
Fresens is first mentioned in 1265 as Hiremanz dit de Fressen.

=== Gorgier ===
Gorgier is first mentioned in 1252 as de Corgie.

=== Saint-Aubin-Sauges ===
Saint-Aubin-Sauges is first mentioned in 1176 as Sancti Albini. In 1340 it was mentioned as villa de Sauges.

=== Vaumarcus ===
Vaumarcus was first mentioned in 1227 as Valmarcuel.

It was created in 1875 as a merger of Vaumarcus and Vernéaz, and was called Vaumarcus-Vernéaz until 1966.

=== Montalchez ===
Montalchez is first mentioned in 1340 as villa de Montallichie.

== Geography ==
After the merger, La Grande Béroche has an area, as of 2009, of 42.25 km^{2} (16.31 sq mi).

It was part of the district of Boudry until the district level was eliminated on 1 January 2018.

== Demographics ==
The new municipality has a population (as of December 2020) of 14,286.

== Historic Population ==
The historical population is given in the following chart:

== Heritage sites of national significance ==
The prehistoric lake shore settlement at Baie De Bevaix, the Neolithic funerary and cultural center of Treytel-A Sugiez in Bevaix, Gorgier Castle, the Gallo-Roman settlement at La Béroche and a prehistoric lake shore settlement in Gorgier, La Béroche, a Gallo-Roman settlement, and the Neolithic settlement at Port Conty / Tivoli in Saint-Aubin-Sauges, the La Redoute Des Bourguignons, a prehistoric site and hallstatt tumulus in Vaumarcus are all listed as Swiss heritage site of national significance.

=== World Heritage Site ===
The new municipality is home to three prehistoric sites which are part of the Prehistoric Pile dwellings around the Alps UNESCO World Heritage Site. Bevaix is home to the L’Abbaye 2 site, Gorgier has the Les Argilliez site and Saint-Aubin-Sauges has the Port-Conty site each of which is a prehistoric pile-dwelling (or stilt house) settlement.

L'Abbaye 2 is a Bronze Age submerged site located near the L'Abbaye 1 Neolithic site. The former village at L'Abbaye 2 is about 180 meters (590 ft) from the lake shore and consisted of a number of stilt houses. It has been dendrochronologically dated to 1040-986 BC. The village site covers an area of about 150 by 80 m (490 by 260 ft) and was probably connected to the shore by a foot bridge. About 400 Bronze Age objects have been discovered in the water around the village.

The Les Argilliez site consists of two villages. One is a Classical Cortaillod village with 6 piles dated between 3841 and 3817 BC. The other is a Late Cortaillod site with 2 piles from 3531 to 3528 BC. Both villages are in a small bay about 200 m (660 ft) north of the Chez-le-Bart 1 site. The remains of the villages are still quite visible underwater and stretch over an area of about 150 m × 50 m (490 ft × 160 ft). Some stone axes, antler ax handles and pottery fragments have been discovered.

Port-Conty has two Neolithic settlements. The first is a Late Cortaillod or Port-Conty type Cortaillod village. One piece of timber from this site has been dated to 3574. The second village is a Late Horgen village. Five of the piles are from 3160 and 3159, and two piles are from 3064 and 3062. The site was discovered in 1860 by F. Troyon, who originally thought it was a Bronze Age village. Further excavations in the late 19th and early 20th century found that it was a Neolithic site. In 1929-1932, P. Vouga dug a long (55 m [180 ft]) 1 to 1.5 m (3.3 to 4.9 ft) deep trench to examine a single layer. He found three archaeological horizons which were from the Middle Neolithic, the Late Neolithic and the end of the Late Neolithic. Based on his study, it appears that the site was covered by an artificial mound which was 20 m × 10 m (66 ft × 33 ft) and about 70 cm (2 ft 4 in) deep. It was built in two stages, with a layer of branches between the layers.

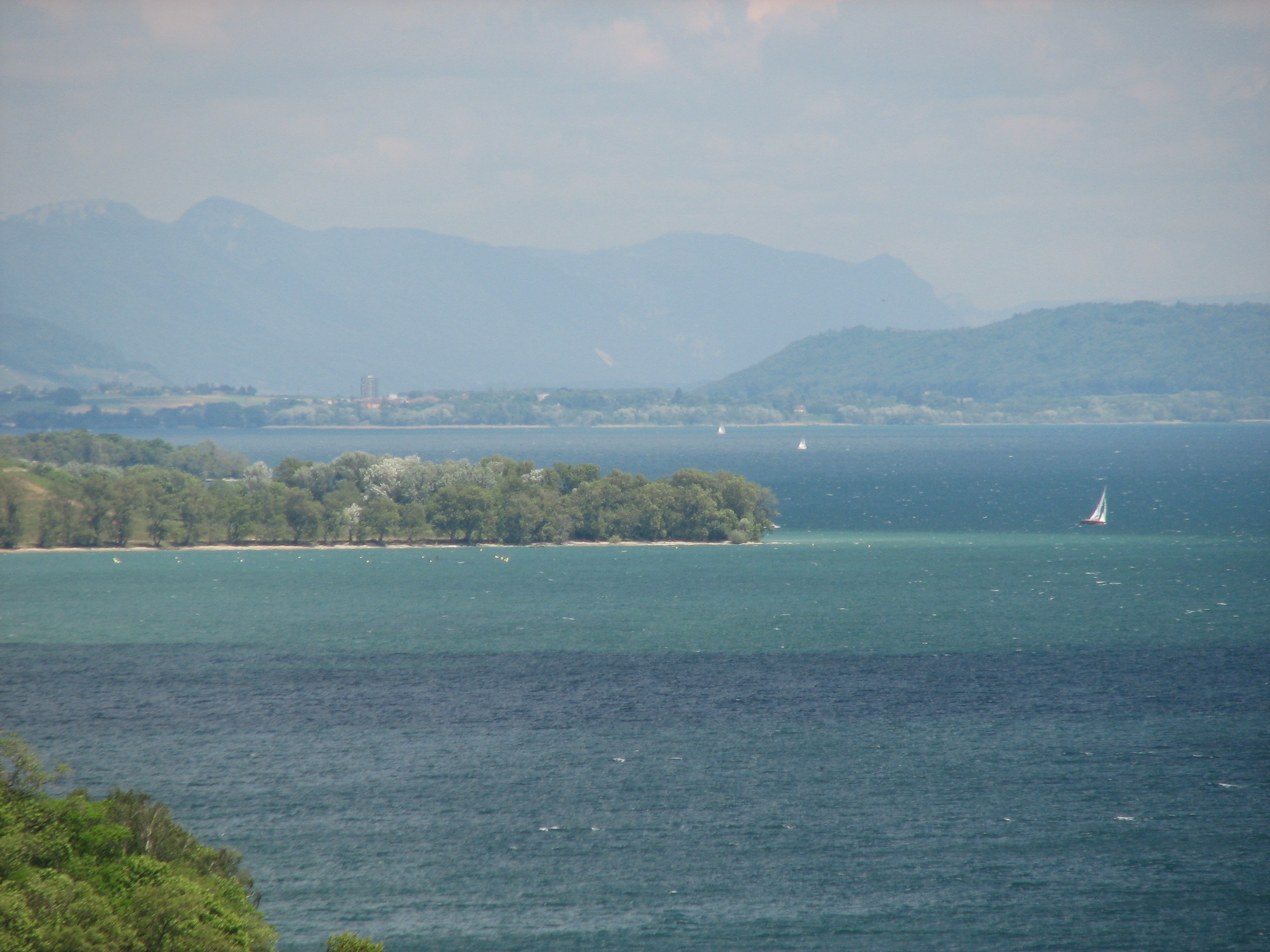
Baie De Bevaix site

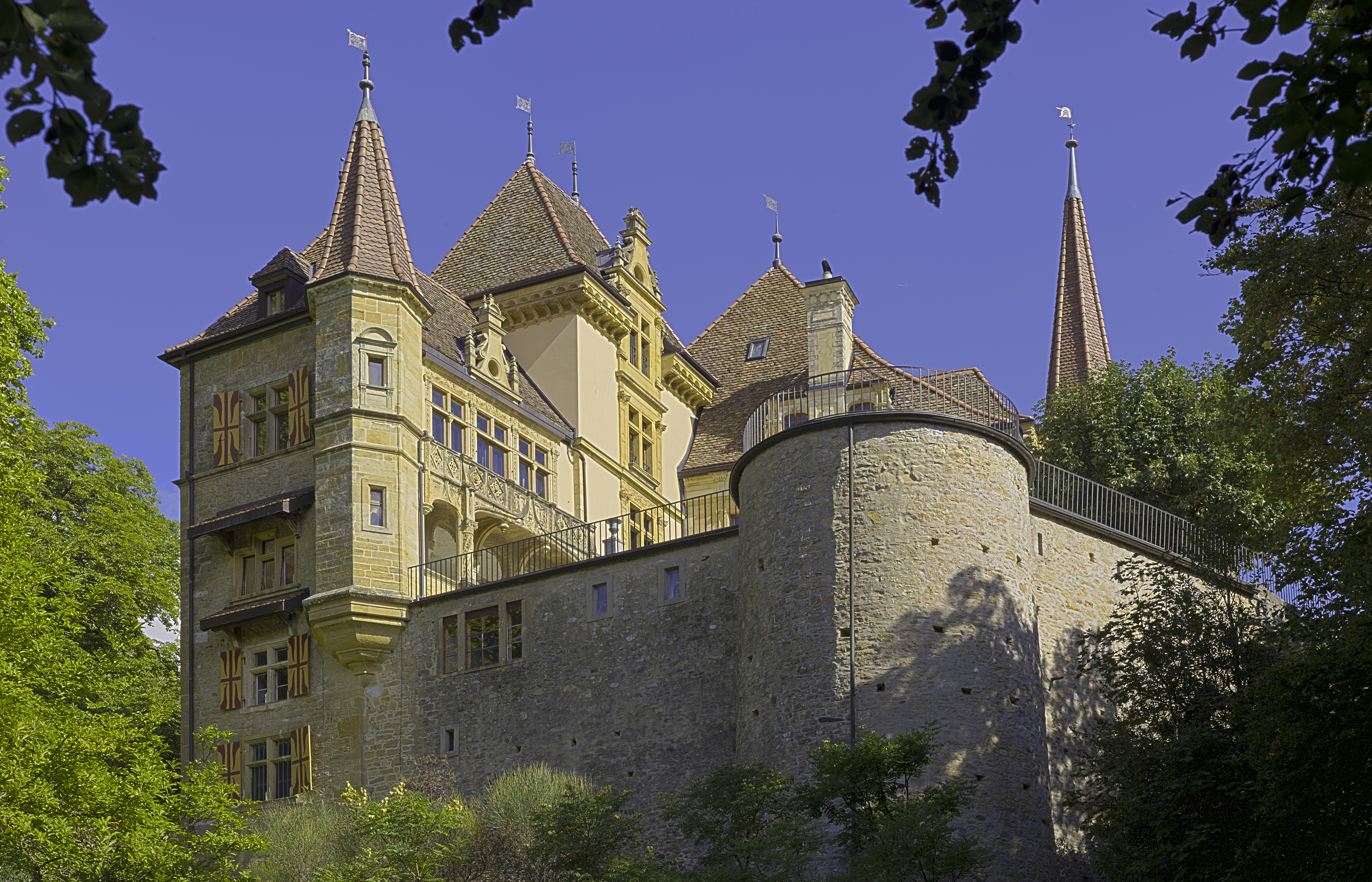
Gorgier Castle

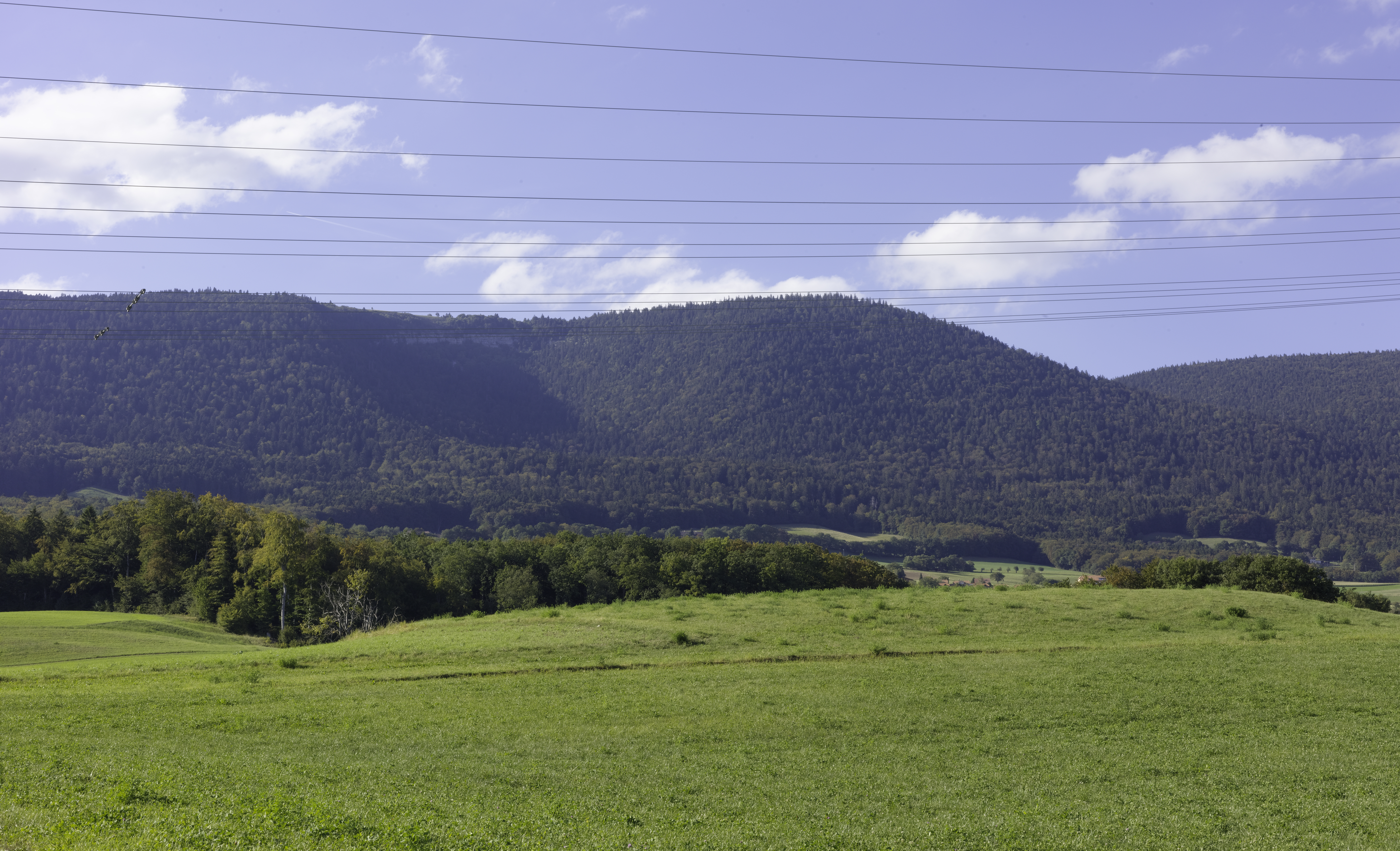
La Béroche area

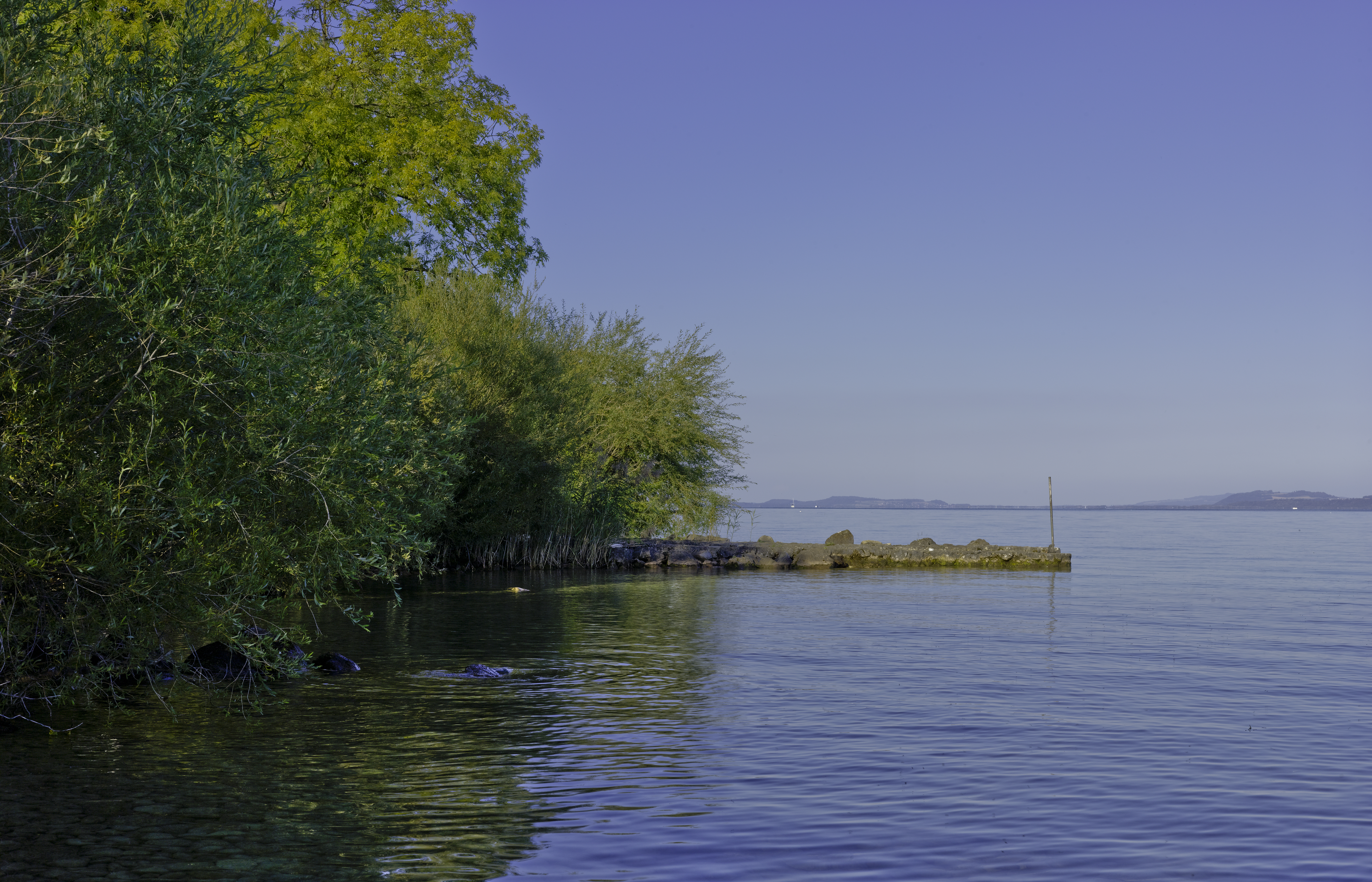
Les Argilliez site

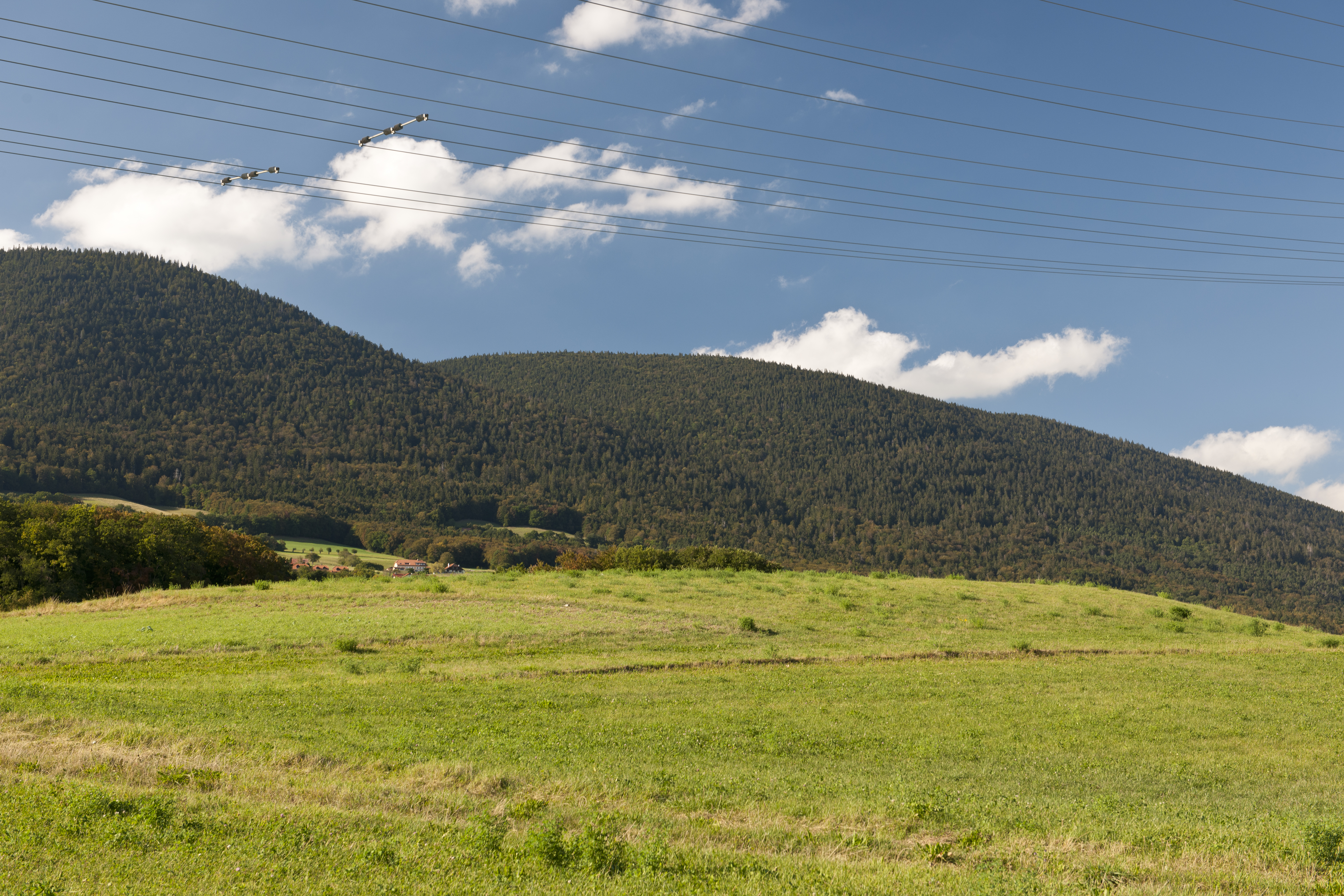
La Béroche site

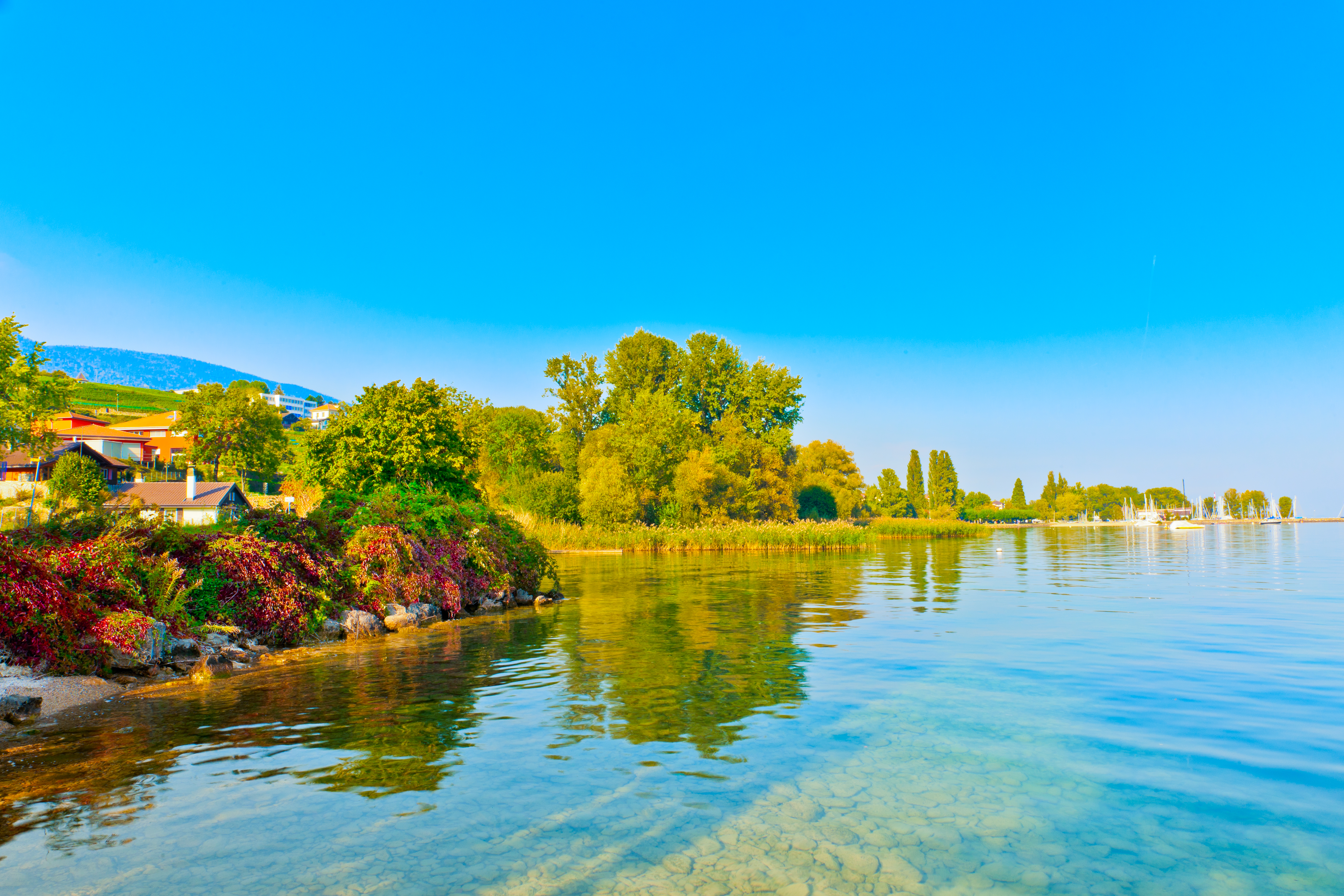
Port Conty
