= Gorgier =

- Former municipality
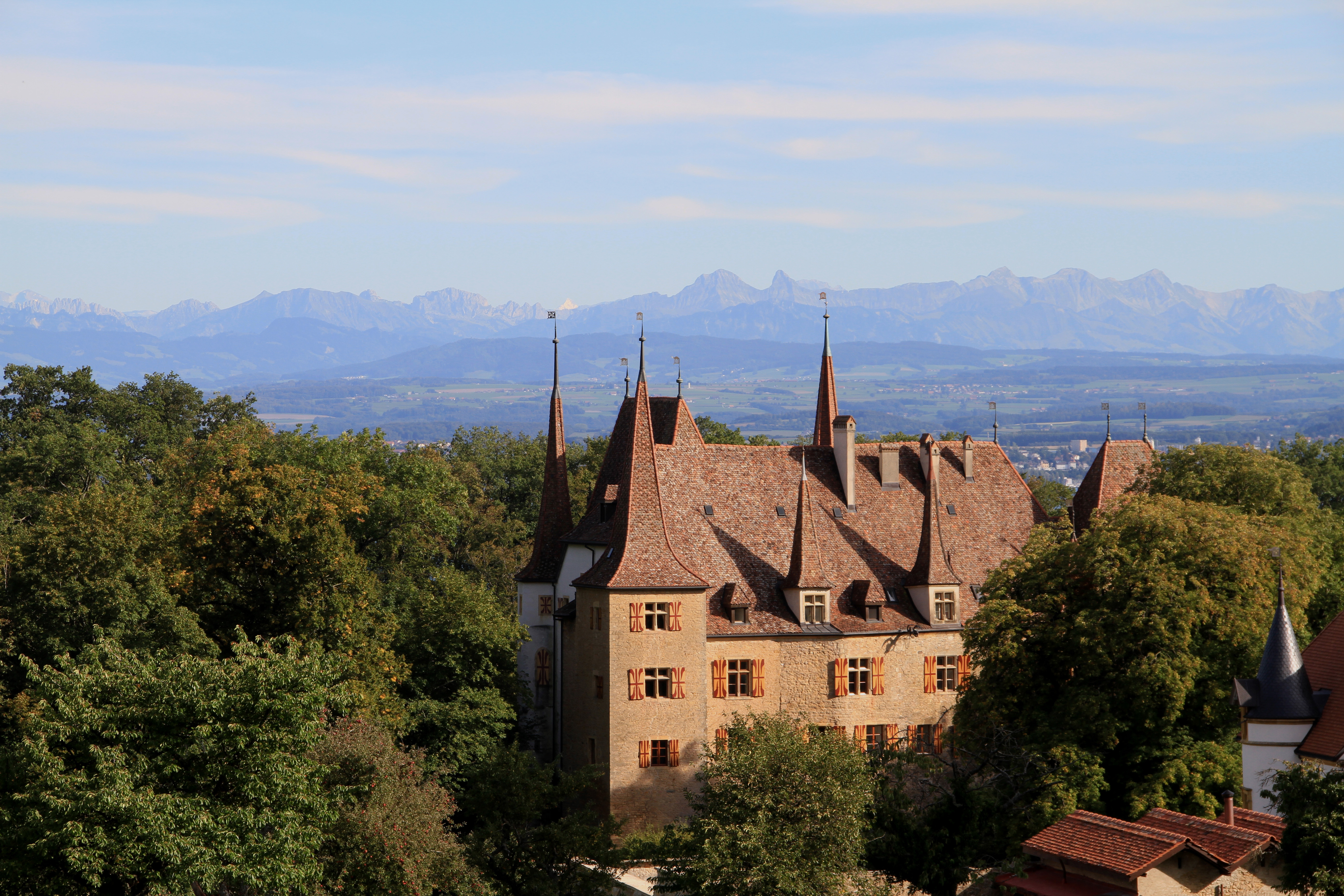
- Gorgier Castle above the village

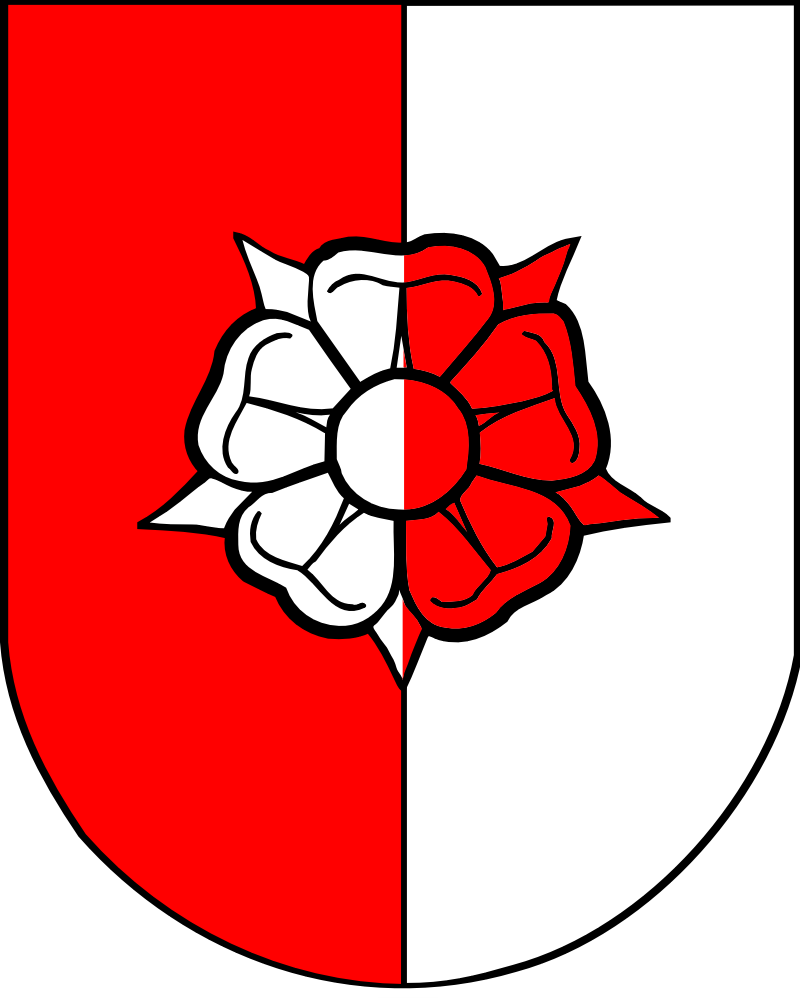
- Coat of arms
- Location of Gorgier
- Location within Switzerland Location within Canton of Neuchâtel
- Coordinates: 46°54′N 6°47′E
- Country: Switzerland
- Canton: Neuchâtel
- District: Boudry

Area
  - Total: 13.97 km^{2} (5.39 sq mi)
- Elevation: 491 m (1,611 ft)

Population (December 2007)
  - Total: 1,851
  - Density: 132.5/km^{2} (343.2/sq mi)
- Time zone: UTC+01:00 (CET)
  - Summer (DST): UTC+02:00 (CEST)
- Postal code: 2023
- SFOS number: 6410
- ISO 3166 code: CH-NE
- Surrounded by: Autavaux (FR), Bevaix, Boudry, Estavayer-le-Lac (FR), Forel (FR), Montalchez, Noiraigue, Provence (VD), Saint-Aubin-Sauges, Travers
- Website: www.gorgier.ch

Gorgier is a former municipality in the district of Boudry in the canton of Neuchâtel in Switzerland. On 1 January 2018 the former municipalities of Bevaix, Saint-Aubin-Sauges, Gorgier, Vaumarcus, Montalchez and Fresens merged into the new municipality of La Grande-Béroche.

== History ==
Gorgier is first mentioned in 1252 as de Corgie.

== Geography ==
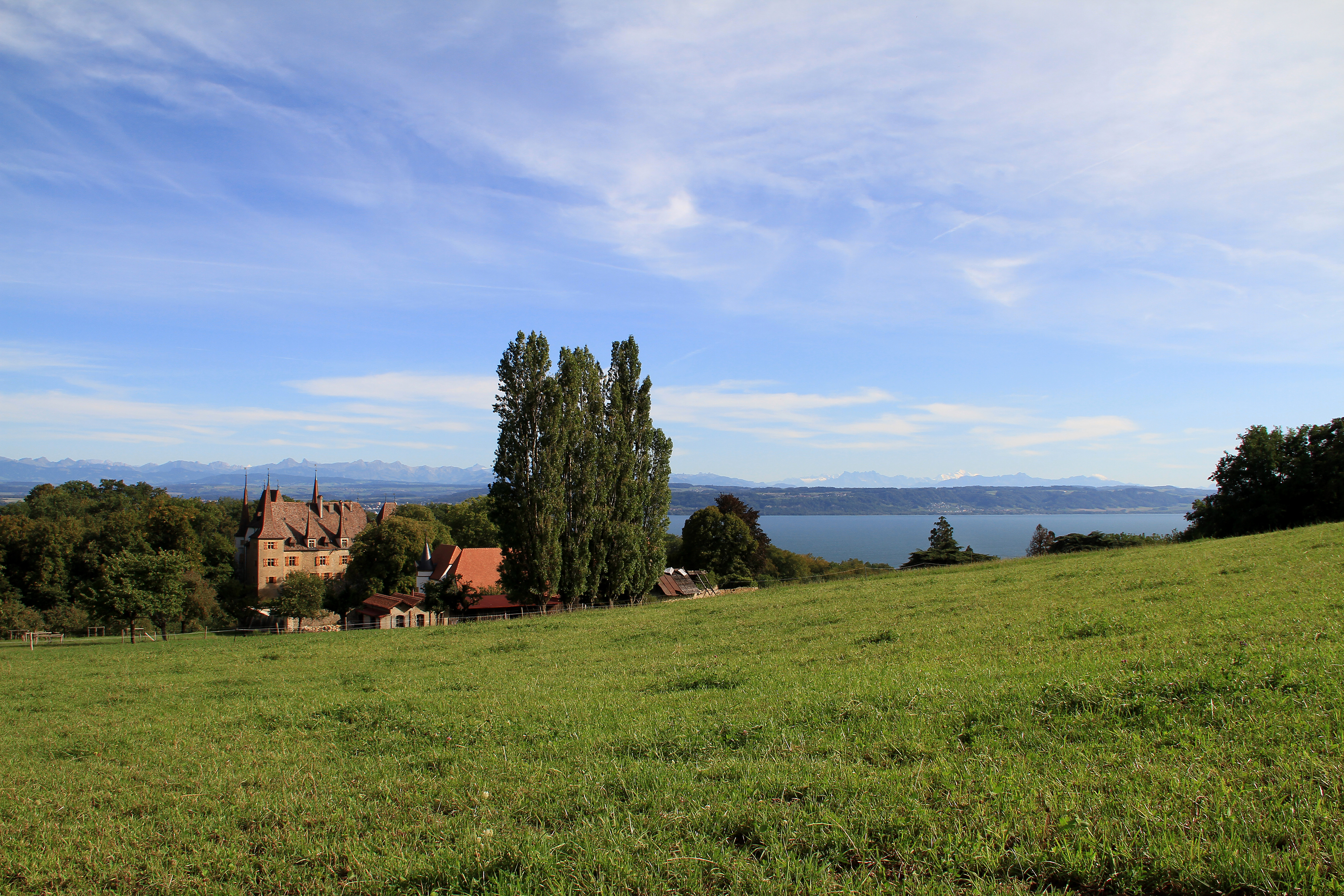
Gorgier castle and Lake Neuchatel

Aerial view (1949)

Gorgier has an area, as of 2009, of 14 square kilometers (5.4 mi^{2}). Of this area, 4.66 km^{2} (1.80 mi^{2}) or 33.3% is used for agricultural purposes, while 7.85 km^{2} (3.03 mi^{2}) or 56.2% is forested. Of the rest of the land, 1.16 km^{2} (0.45 mi^{2}) or 8.3% is settled (buildings or roads) and 0.31 km^{2} (0.12 mi^{2}) or 2.2% is unproductive land.

Of the built up area, housing and buildings made up 4.5% and transportation infrastructure made up 2.6%. Out of the forested land, 53.4% of the total land area is heavily forested and 2.8% is covered with orchards or small clusters of trees. Of the agricultural land, 10.7% is used for growing crops and 11.3% is pastures, while 4.5% is used for orchards or vine crops and 6.9% is used for alpine pastures. Of the unproductive areas, and 1.6% is too rocky for vegetation.

The municipality is located in the Boudry district, on a hill above Lake Neuchatel. It consists of the village of Gorgier, the hamlets of Chez-le-Bart and the farm houses of Les Prises on Lake Neuchatel.

== Coat of arms ==
The blazon of the municipal coat of arms is Per pale Gules and Argent, a Rose counterchanged.

== Demographics ==
Gorgier has a population (as of December 2020) of 2,021. As of 2008, 15.0% of the population are resident foreign nationals. Over the last 10 years (2000–2010 ) the population has changed at a rate of 10.8%. It has changed at a rate of 10.5% due to migration and at a rate of -0.3% due to births and deaths.

Most of the population (as of 2000) speaks French (1,530 or 86.2%) as their first language, German is the second most common (97 or 5.5%) and Italian is the third (39 or 2.2%). There is 1 person who speaks Romansh.

As of 2008, the population was 50.5% male and 49.5% female. The population was made up of 784 Swiss men (40.8% of the population) and 187 (9.7%) non-Swiss men. There were 824 Swiss women (42.8%) and 128 (6.7%) non-Swiss women. Of the population in the municipality, 389 or about 21.9% were born in Gorgier and lived there in 2000. There were 537 or 30.3% who were born in the same canton, while 458 or 25.8% were born somewhere else in Switzerland, and 339 or 19.1% were born outside of Switzerland.

As of 2000, children and teenagers (0–19 years old) make up 23.1% of the population, while adults (20–64 years old) make up 59.3% and seniors (over 64 years old) make up 17.6%.

As of 2000, there were 637 people who were single and never married in the municipality. There were 954 married individuals, 98 widows or widowers and 86 individuals who are divorced.

As of 2000, there were 716 private households in the municipality, and an average of 2.4 persons per household. There were 198 households that consist of only one person and 42 households with five or more people. In 2000, a total of 701 apartments (85.2% of the total) were permanently occupied, while 91 apartments (11.1%) were seasonally occupied and 31 apartments (3.8%) were empty. As of 2009, the construction rate of new housing units was 17.3 new units per 1000 residents.

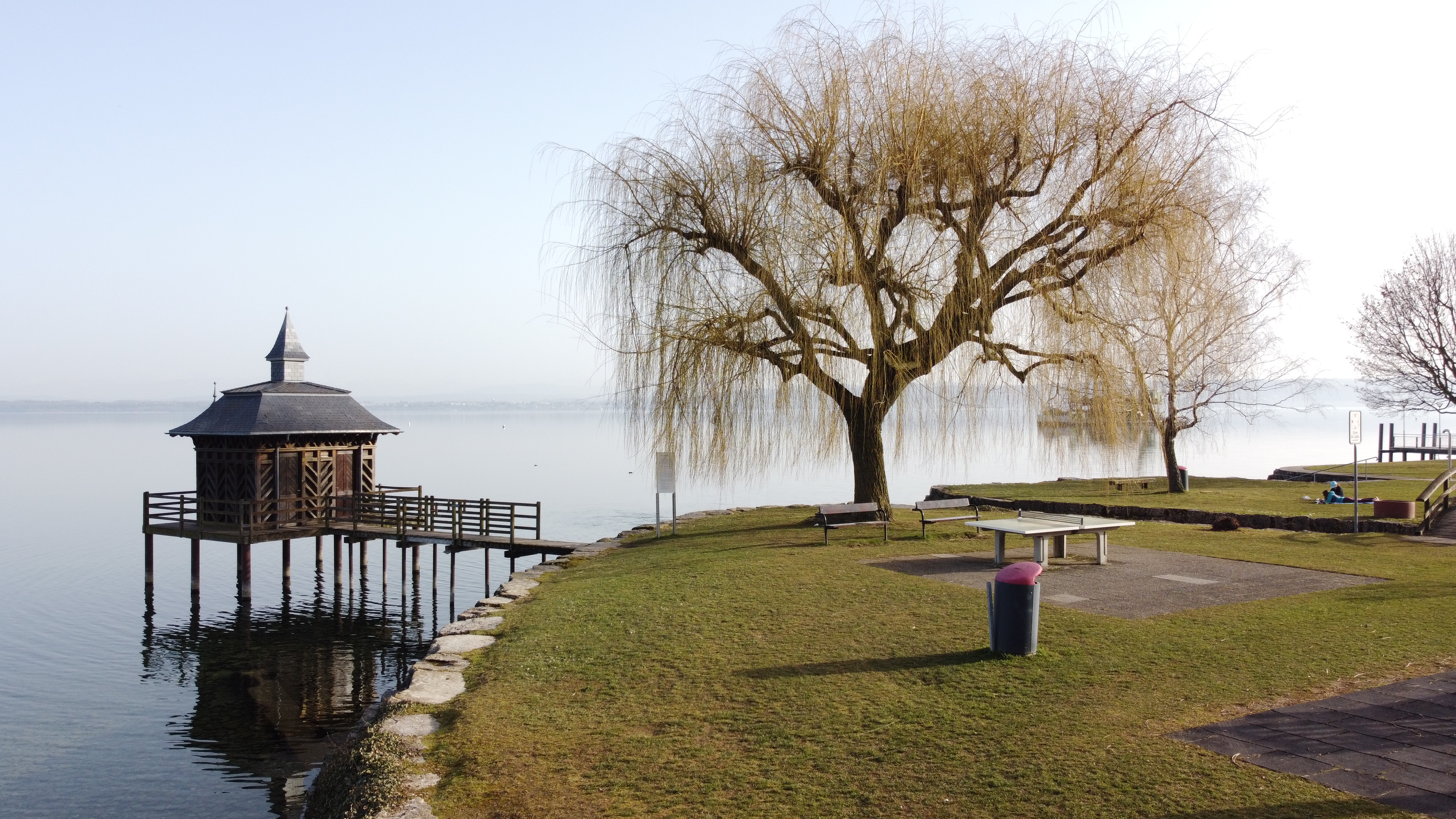
Lake Neuchatel

The historical population is given in the following chart:

== Heritage sites of national significance ==
The Castle, the Gallo-Roman settlement at La Béroche and a prehistoric lake shore settlement are listed as Swiss heritage site of national significance.

=== World heritage site ===
It is home to the Les Argilliez prehistoric pile-dwelling (or stilt house) settlement that is part of the Prehistoric Pile dwellings around the Alps UNESCO World Heritage Site.

The Les Argilliez site consists of two villages. One is a Classical Cortaillod village with 6 piles dated between 3841 and 3817 BC. The other is a Late Cortaillod site with 2 piles from 3531 to 3528 BC. Both villages are in a small bay about 200 m (660 ft) north of the Chez-le-Bart 1 site. The remains of the villages are still quite visible underwater and stretch over an area of about 150 m × 50 m (490 ft × 160 ft). Some stone axes, antler ax handles and pottery fragments have been discovered.

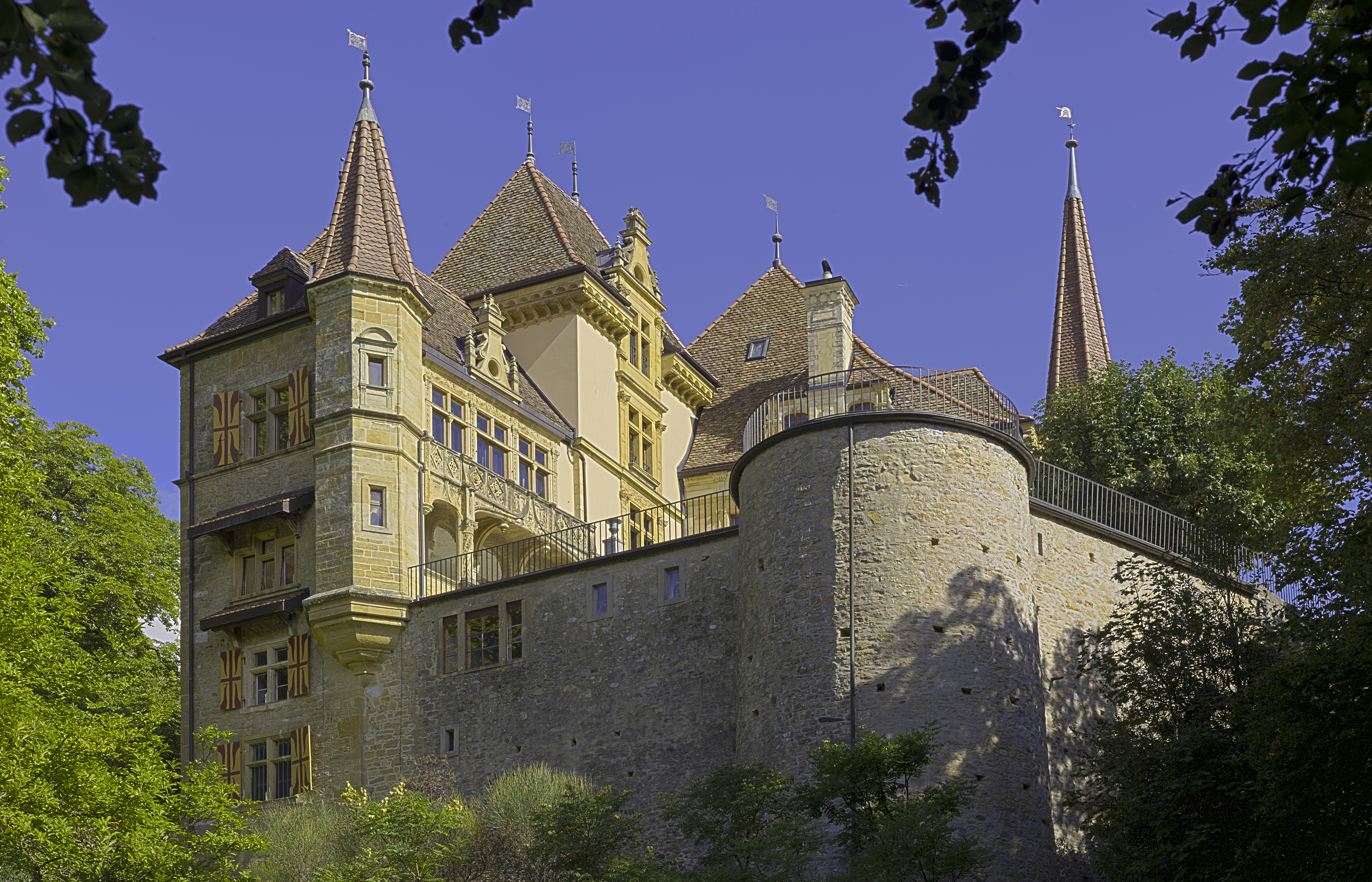
Gorgier Castle

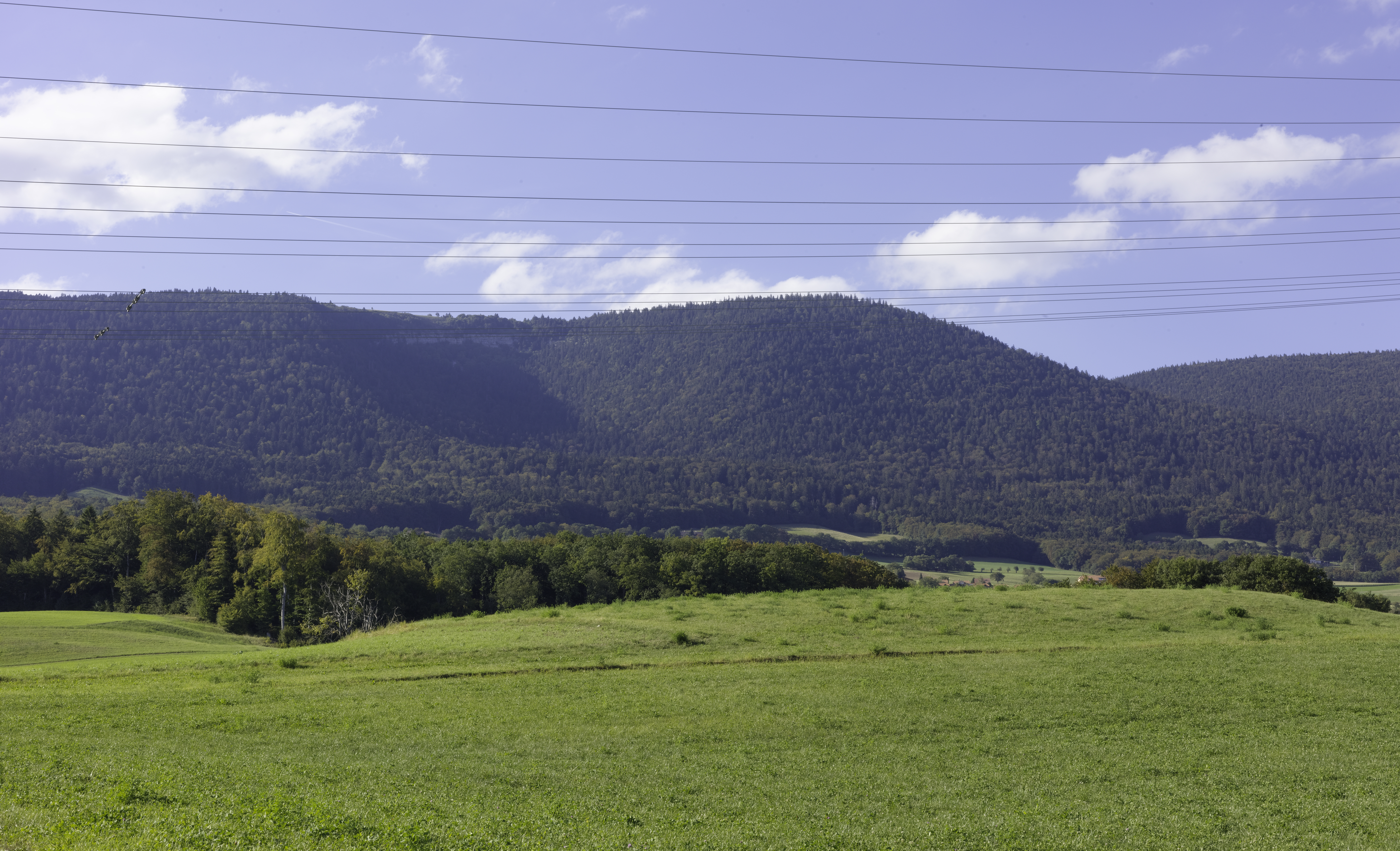
La Béroche area

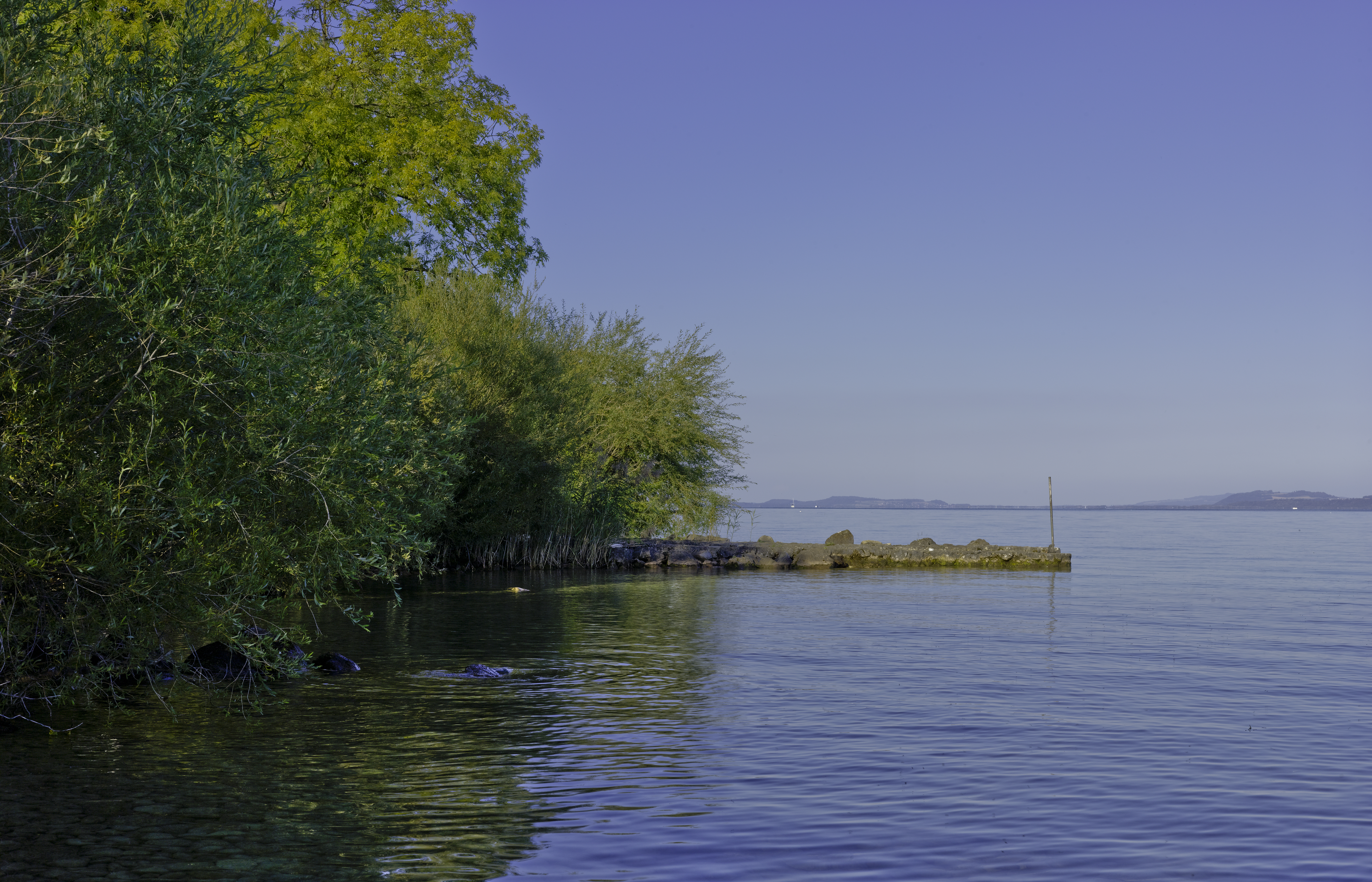
Site of the Prehistoric Lake Shore Settlement

== Politics ==
In the 2007 federal election the most popular party was the SVP which received 25.58% of the vote. The next three most popular parties were the SP (22.61%), the LPS Party (19.06%) and the FDP (11.32%). In the federal election, a total of 711 votes were cast, and the voter turnout was 55.3%.

== Economy ==
As of 2010, Gorgier had an unemployment rate of 4.5%. As of 2008, there were 61 people employed in the primary economic sector and about 25 businesses involved in this sector. 91 people were employed in the secondary sector and there were 24 businesses in this sector. 275 people were employed in the tertiary sector, with 40 businesses in this sector. There were 889 residents of the municipality who were employed in some capacity, of which females made up 39.8% of the workforce.

In 2008 the total number of full-time equivalent jobs was 331. The number of jobs in the primary sector was 41, of which 38 were in agriculture, 1 was in forestry or lumber production and 1 was in fishing or fisheries. The number of jobs in the secondary sector was 81 of which 57 or (70.4%) were in manufacturing and 23 (28.4%) were in construction. The number of jobs in the tertiary sector was 209. In the tertiary sector; 24 or 11.5% were in wholesale or retail sales or the repair of motor vehicles, 8 or 3.8% were in the movement and storage of goods, 29 or 13.9% were in a hotel or restaurant, 2 or 1.0% were in the information industry, 11 or 5.3% were the insurance or financial industry, 12 or 5.7% were technical professionals or scientists, 72 or 34.4% were in education.

In 2000, there were 280 workers who commuted into the municipality and 631 workers who commuted away. The municipality is a net exporter of workers, with about 2.3 workers leaving the municipality for every one entering. About 2.5% of the workforce coming into Gorgier are coming from outside Switzerland. Of the working population, 10.3% used public transportation to get to work, and 65.9% used a private car.

== Religion ==
From the 2000 census, 452 or 25.5% were Roman Catholic, while 821 or 46.3% belonged to the Swiss Reformed Church. Of the rest of the population, there were 13 members of an Orthodox church (or about 0.73% of the population), there was 1 individual who belongs to the Christian Catholic Church, and there were 168 individuals (or about 9.46% of the population) who belonged to another Christian church. There were 2 individuals (or about 0.11% of the population) who were Jewish, and 24 (or about 1.35% of the population) who were Islamic. There were 5 individuals who were Buddhist. 297 (or about 16.73% of the population) belonged to no church, are agnostic or atheist, and 75 individuals (or about 4.23% of the population) did not answer the question.

== Education ==
In Gorgier about 653 or (36.8%) of the population have completed non-mandatory upper secondary education, and 251 or (14.1%) have completed additional higher education (either university or a Fachhochschule). Of the 251 who completed tertiary schooling, 58.2% were Swiss men, 26.7% were Swiss women, 10.0% were non-Swiss men and 5.2% were non-Swiss women.

In the canton of Neuchâtel most municipalities provide two years of non-mandatory kindergarten, followed by five years of mandatory primary education. The next four years of mandatory secondary education is provided at thirteen larger secondary schools, which many students travel out of their home municipality to attend. During the 2010–11 school year, there were 2 kindergarten classes with a total of 36 students in Gorgier. In the same year, there were 5 primary classes with a total of 101 students.

As of 2000, there were 458 students in Gorgier who came from another municipality, while 68 residents attended schools outside the municipality.
