= Peseux, Switzerland =

Peseux
- Former municipality
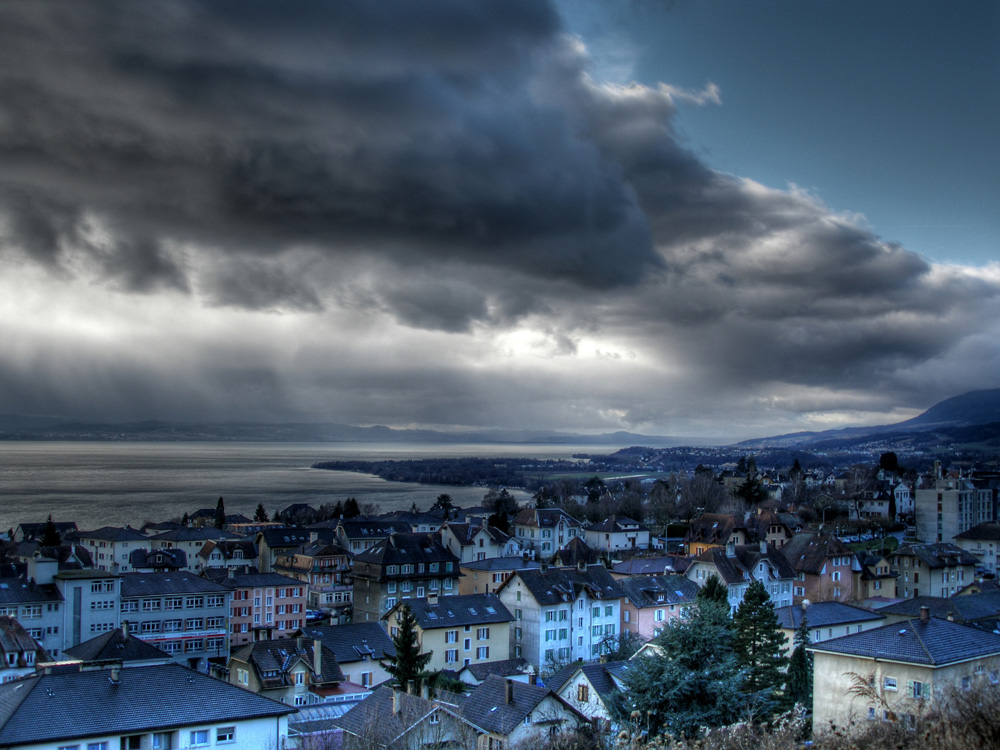
- Peseux and Lake Neuchatel

- Coat of arms
- Location of Peseux
- Location within Switzerland Location within Canton of Neuchâtel
- Coordinates: 46°59′N 6°53′E
- Country: Switzerland
- Canton: Neuchâtel
- District: Boudry

Area
  - Total: 3.43 km^{2} (1.32 sq mi)
- Elevation: 543 m (1,781 ft)

Population (December 2019)
  - Total: 5,794
  - Density: 1,690/km^{2} (4,380/sq mi)
- Time zone: UTC+01:00 (CET)
  - Summer (DST): UTC+02:00 (CEST)
- Postal code: 2034
- SFOS number: 6412
- ISO 3166 code: CH-NE
- Surrounded by: Auvernier, Coffrane, Corcelles-Cormondrèche, Neuchâtel, Valangin
- Website: www.peseux.ch

Peseux (French pronunciation: [pəzø]) is a former municipality in the district of Boudry in the canton of Neuchâtel in Switzerland. On 1 January 2021 the former municipalities of Corcelles-Cormondrèche, Peseux and Valangin merged into the municipality of Neuchâtel.

== History ==
Peseux is first mentioned in 1195 as apud Pusoz though this comes from a 15th-century copy of an earlier document. In 1278 it was mentioned as de Posoys.

== Geography ==
Aerial view by Walter Mittelholzer (1926)

Peseux had an area, as of 2009, of 3.4 square kilometers (1.3 mi^{2}). Of this area, 0.1 km^{2} (0.039 mi^{2}) or 2.9% is used for agricultural purposes, while 2.42 km^{2} (0.93 mi^{2}) or 70.6% is forested. Of the rest of the land, 0.93 km^{2} (0.36 mi^{2}) or 27.1% is settled (buildings or roads).

Of the built up area, industrial buildings made up 1.2% of the total area while housing and buildings made up 18.7% and transportation infrastructure made up 5.0%. while parks, green belts and sports fields made up 1.5%. Out of the forested land, all of the forested land area is covered with heavy forests. Of the agricultural land, 0.6% is used for growing crops and 1.2% is pastures, while 1.2% is used for orchards or vine crops.

The former municipality is located near Neuchâtel on the road into Val-de-Travers. The woods at the lower end of the Val-de-Ruz cover about two-thirds of the municipality.

== Coat of arms ==
The blazon of the municipal coat of arms is Per fess Or and Azure, overall on a Bar Argent a Rifle Sable.

== Demographics ==
Peseux had a population (as of 2019) of 5,794. As of 2008, 33.4% of the population are resident foreign nationals. Over the last 10 years (2000–2010 ) the population has changed at a rate of 3.4%. It has changed at a rate of 2.2% due to migration and at a rate of 0.8% due to births and deaths.

Most of the population (as of 2000) speaks French (4,463 or 82.8%) as their first language, Italian is the second most common (217 or 4.0%) and German is the third (211 or 3.9%). There are 5 people who speak Romansh.

As of 2008, the population was 48.3% male and 51.7% female. The population was made up of 1,775 Swiss men (31.0% of the population) and 986 (17.2%) non-Swiss men. There were 2,162 Swiss women (37.8%) and 798 (13.9%) non-Swiss women. Of the population in the municipality, 970 or about 18.0% were born in Peseux and lived there in 2000. There were 1,727 or 32.1% who were born in the same canton, while 1,073 or 19.9% were born somewhere else in Switzerland, and 1,414 or 26.2% were born outside of Switzerland.

As of 2000, children and teenagers (0–19 years old) make up 21.9% of the population, while adults (20–64 years old) make up 60% and seniors (over 64 years old) make up 18.1%.

As of 2000, there were 2,036 people who were single and never married in the municipality. There were 2,540 married individuals, 401 widows or widowers and 410 individuals who are divorced.

As of 2000, there were 2,528 private households in the municipality, and an average of 2.1 persons per household. There were 1,050 households that consist of only one person and 106 households with five or more people. In 2000, a total of 2,460 apartments (91.8% of the total) were permanently occupied, while 172 apartments (6.4%) were seasonally occupied and 49 apartments (1.8%) were empty. The vacancy rate for the municipality, in 2010, was 0.51%.

The historical population is given in the following chart:

== Politics ==
In the 2007 federal election the most popular party was the SVP which received 26.91% of the vote. The next three most popular parties were the SP (25.86%), the FDP (12.63%) and the LPS Party (12.33%). In the federal election, a total of 1,556 votes were cast, and the voter turnout was 48.4%.

== Economy ==
As of 2010, Peseux had an unemployment rate of 8.1%. As of 2008, there were 2 people employed in the primary economic sector and about 1 business involved in this sector. 435 people were employed in the secondary sector and there were 45 businesses in this sector. 1,224 people were employed in the tertiary sector, with 189 businesses in this sector. There were 2,527 residents of the municipality who were employed in some capacity, of which females made up 44.0% of the workforce.

In 2008 the total number of full-time equivalent jobs was 1,418. The number of jobs in the primary sector was 2, of which were in agriculture and 2 were in forestry or lumber production. The number of jobs in the secondary sector was 413 of which 178 or (43.1%) were in manufacturing and 233 (56.4%) were in construction. The number of jobs in the tertiary sector was 1,003. In the tertiary sector; 325 or 32.4% were in wholesale or retail sales or the repair of motor vehicles, 139 or 13.9% were in the movement and storage of goods, 46 or 4.6% were in a hotel or restaurant, 33 or 3.3% were in the information industry, 24 or 2.4% were the insurance or financial industry, 80 or 8.0% were technical professionals or scientists, 109 or 10.9% were in education and 98 or 9.8% were in health care.

In 2000, there were 1,181 workers who commuted into the municipality and 1,943 workers who commuted away. The municipality is a net exporter of workers, with about 1.6 workers leaving the municipality for every one entering. Of the working population, 23.3% used public transportation to get to work, and 56.7% used a private car.

== Religion ==
From the 2000 census, 1,740 or 32.3% were Roman Catholic, while 1,751 or 32.5% belonged to the Swiss Reformed Church. Of the rest of the population, there were 24 members of an Orthodox church (or about 0.45% of the population), there were 13 individuals (or about 0.24% of the population) who belonged to the Christian Catholic Church, and there were 433 individuals (or about 8.04% of the population) who belonged to another Christian church. There were 7 individuals (or about 0.13% of the population) who were Jewish, and 225 (or about 4.18% of the population) who were Islamic. There were 10 individuals who were Buddhist, 7 individuals who were Hindu and 3 individuals who belonged to another church. 1,106 (or about 20.53% of the population) belonged to no church, are agnostic or atheist, and 279 individuals (or about 5.18% of the population) did not answer the question.

== Education ==
In Peseux about 1,932 or (35.9%) of the population have completed non-mandatory upper secondary education, and 659 or (12.2%) have completed additional higher education (either university or a Fachhochschule). Of the 659 who completed tertiary schooling, 55.2% were Swiss men, 25.0% were Swiss women, 11.5% were non-Swiss men and 8.2% were non-Swiss women.

In the canton of Neuchâtel most municipalities provide two years of non-mandatory kindergarten, followed by five years of mandatory primary education. The next four years of mandatory secondary education is provided at thirteen larger secondary schools, which many students travel out of their home municipality to attend. During the 2010-11 school year, there were 5 kindergarten classes with a total of 91 students in Peseux. In the same year, there were 15 primary classes with a total of 289 students.

As of 2000, there were 306 students in Peseux who came from another municipality, while 216 residents attended schools outside the municipality.

== Notable people ==
- Louis Zutter (1865–1946) a Swiss gymnast, competed at the 1896 Summer Olympics in Athens; lived in Peseux.
- Monique Laederach (1938 – 2004 in Peseux) a Swiss writer and translator, member of the Gruppe Olten
