= Fresens =

- Former municipality
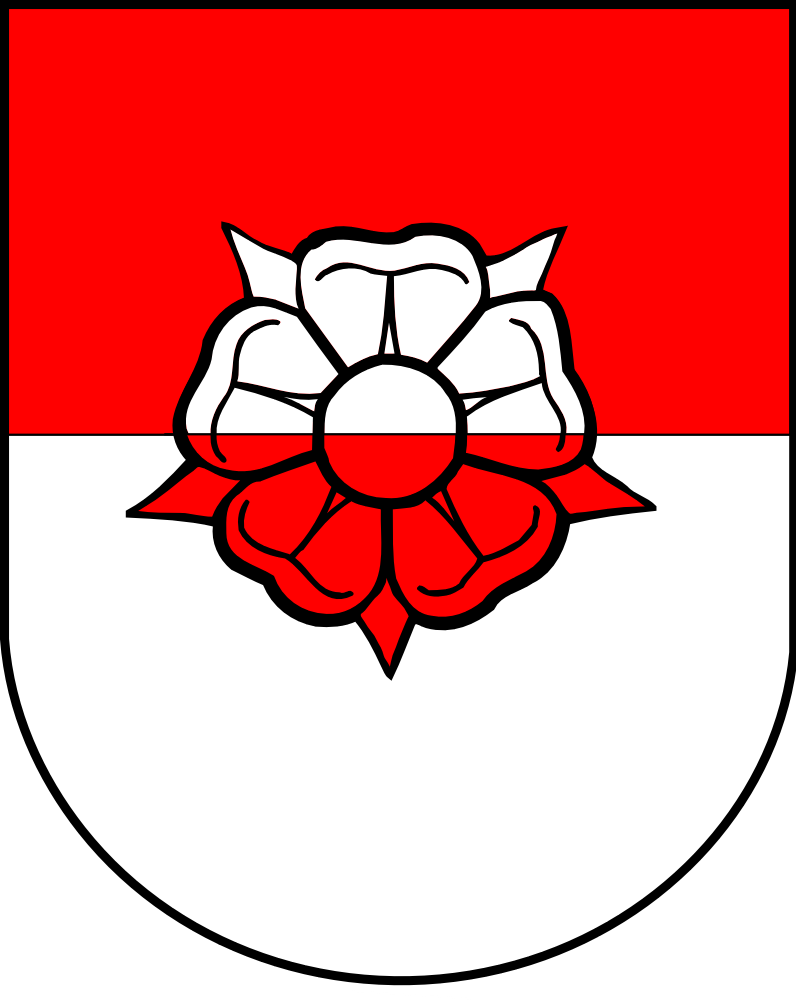
- Coat of arms
- Location of Fresens
- Location within Switzerland Location within Canton of Neuchâtel
- Coordinates: 46°53′N 6°45′E
- Country: Switzerland
- Canton: Neuchâtel
- District: Boudry

Area
  - Total: 1.58 km^{2} (0.61 sq mi)
- Elevation: 620 m (2,030 ft)

Population (December 2007)
  - Total: 205
  - Density: 130/km^{2} (336/sq mi)
- Time zone: UTC+01:00 (CET)
  - Summer (DST): UTC+02:00 (CEST)
- Postal code: 2027
- SFOS number: 6409
- ISO 3166 code: CH-NE
- Surrounded by: Montalchez, Mutrux (VD), Provence (VD), Saint-Aubin-Sauges, Vaumarcus
- Website: SFSO statistics

Fresens is a former municipality in the district of Boudry in the canton of Neuchâtel in Switzerland. On 1 January 2018 the former municipalities of Bevaix, Saint-Aubin-Sauges, Gorgier, Vaumarcus, Montalchez and Fresens merged into the new municipality of La Grande-Béroche. It was first mentioned in 1265 as Hiremanz dit de Fressen.

== History ==
Fresens is first mentioned in 1265 as Hiremanz dit de Fressen.

== Geography ==
Fresens has an area, as of 2009, of 1.6 square kilometers (0.62 mi^{2}). Of this area, 1.32 km^{2} (0.51 mi^{2}) or 83.5% is used for agricultural purposes, while 0.12 km^{2} (0.046 mi^{2}) or 7.6% is forested. Of the rest of the land, 0.15 km^{2} (37 acres) or 9.5% is settled (buildings or roads).

Of the built up area, housing and buildings made up 5.1% and transportation infrastructure made up 3.8%. Out of the forested land, 5.7% of the total land area is heavily forested and 1.9% is covered with orchards or small clusters of trees. Of the agricultural land, 64.6% is used for growing crops and 13.3% is pastures, while 5.7% is used for orchards or vine crops.

The municipality is located in the Boudry district.

== Coat of arms ==
The blazon of the municipal coat of arms is Per fess Gules and Argent, a Rose counterchanged.

== Demographics ==
Fresens has a population (as of December 2020) of 252. As of 2008, 2.4% of the population are resident foreign nationals. Over the last 10 years (2000–2010 ) the population has changed at a rate of 10.6%. It has changed at a rate of 2.1% due to migration and at a rate of 7.4% due to births and deaths.

Most of the population (as of 2000) speaks French (206 or 94.5%) as their first language, German is the second most common (8 or 3.7%) and Italian is the third (1 or 0.5%).

As of 2008, the population was 49.8% male and 50.2% female. The population was made up of 105 Swiss men (48.8% of the population) and 2 (0.9%) non-Swiss men. There were 107 Swiss women (49.8%) and 1 (0.5%) non-Swiss women. Of the population in the municipality, 78 or about 35.8% were born in Fresens and lived there in 2000. There were 54 or 24.8% who were born in the same canton, while 62 or 28.4% were born somewhere else in Switzerland, and 15 or 6.9% were born outside of Switzerland.

As of 2000, children and teenagers (0–19 years old) make up 22.9% of the population, while adults (20–64 years old) make up 48.2% and seniors (over 64 years old) make up 28.9%.

As of 2000, there were 85 people who were single and never married in the municipality. There were 98 married individuals, 24 widows or widowers and 11 individuals who are divorced.

As of 2000, there were 62 private households in the municipality, and an average of 2.8 persons per household. There were 10 households that consist of only one person and 9 households with five or more people. In 2000, a total of 60 apartments (83.3% of the total) were permanently occupied, while 6 apartments (8.3%) were seasonally occupied and 6 apartments (8.3%) were empty. As of 2009, the construction rate of new housing units was 4.8 new units per 1000 residents.

The historical population is given in the following chart:

== Politics ==
In the 2007 federal election the most popular party was the SVP which received 32.61% of the vote. The next three most popular parties were the SP (18.86%), the FDP (12.77%) and the Green Party (11.98%). In the federal election, a total of 104 votes were cast, and the voter turnout was 65.8%.

== Economy ==
As of 2010, Fresens had an unemployment rate of 5%. As of 2008, there were 24 people employed in the primary economic sector and about 9 businesses involved in this sector. 78 people were employed in the secondary sector and there were 5 businesses in this sector. 60 people were employed in the tertiary sector, with 3 businesses in this sector. There were 94 residents of the municipality who were employed in some capacity, of which females made up 37.2% of the workforce.

In 2008 the total number of full-time equivalent jobs was 134. The number of jobs in the primary sector was 18, all of which were in agriculture. The number of jobs in the secondary sector was 77 of which 26 or (33.8%) were in manufacturing and 51 (66.2%) were in construction. The number of jobs in the tertiary sector was 39. In the tertiary sector; 2 or 5.1% were in education and 37 or 94.9% were in health care.

In 2000, there were 100 workers who commuted into the municipality and 49 workers who commuted away. The municipality is a net importer of workers, with about 2.0 workers entering the municipality for every one leaving. About 13.0% of the workforce coming into Fresens are coming from outside Switzerland. Of the working population, 5.3% used public transportation to get to work, and 46.8% used a private car.

== Religion ==
From the 2000 census, 8 or 3.7% were Roman Catholic, while 99 or 45.4% belonged to the Swiss Reformed Church. Of the rest of the population, there were 2 members of an Orthodox church (or about 0.92% of the population), and there were 142 individuals (or about 65.14% of the population) who belonged to another Christian church. There were 2 individuals (or about 0.92% of the population) who were Jewish, and there was 1 individual who was Islamic. There were 1 individual who belonged to another church. 25 (or about 11.47% of the population) belonged to no church, are agnostic or atheist, and 9 individuals (or about 4.13% of the population) did not answer the question.

== Education ==
In Fresens about 91 or (41.7%) of the population have completed non-mandatory upper secondary education, and 25 or (11.5%) have completed additional higher education (either university or a Fachhochschule). Of the 25 who completed tertiary schooling, 64.0% were Swiss men, 36.0% were Swiss women.

In the canton of Neuchâtel most municipalities provide two years of non-mandatory kindergarten, followed by five years of mandatory primary education. The next four years of mandatory secondary education is provided at thirteen larger secondary schools, which many students travel out of their home municipality to attend. Both the kindergarten and the primary school are combined with Montalchez. During the 2010-11 school year, there was one kindergarten class with a total of 23 students between the municipalities. In the same year, there was one primary class with a total of 16 students.

As of 2000, there were 2 students in Fresens who came from another municipality, while 22 residents attended schools outside the municipality.
