= Corcelles-Cormondrèche =

- Former municipality
- Coat of arms
- Location of Corcelles-Cormondrèche
- Location within Switzerland Location within Canton of Neuchâtel
- Coordinates: 46°59′N 6°53′E
- Country: Switzerland
- Canton: Neuchâtel
- District: Boudry

Area
  - Total: 4.86 km^{2} (1.88 sq mi)
- Elevation: 550 m (1,800 ft)

Population (December 2019)
  - Total: 4,794
  - Density: 986/km^{2} (2,550/sq mi)
- Time zone: UTC+01:00 (CET)
  - Summer (DST): UTC+02:00 (CEST)
- Postal code: 2035, 2036
- SFOS number: 6407
- ISO 3166 code: CH-NE
- Surrounded by: Auvernier, Coffrane, Colombier, Montmollin, Peseux, Rochefort
- Website: www.corcelles-cormondreche.ch

Corcelles-Cormondrèche (French pronunciation: [kɔʁsɛl kɔʁmɔ̃dʁɛʃ]) is a former municipality in the district of Boudry in the canton of Neuchâtel in Switzerland. On 1 January 2021 the former municipalities of Corcelles-Cormondrèche, Peseux and Valangin merged into the municipality of Neuchâtel.

== History ==
Corcelles-Cormondrèche is first mentioned in 1092 as Curcellis. Around 1220 it was mentioned as Cormundreschi.

== Geography ==
Aerial view from 1000 m by Walter Mittelholzer (1926)

The former municipality is situated about 5 km west of Neuchâtel.

Corcelles-Cormondrèche had an area, as of 2009, of 4.9 square kilometers (1.9 mi^{2}). Of this area, 1.49 km^{2} (0.58 mi^{2}) or 30.7% is used for agricultural purposes, while 2.08 km^{2} (0.80 mi^{2}) or 42.8% is forested. Of the rest of the land, 1.28 km^{2} (0.49 mi^{2}) or 26.3% is settled (buildings or roads), 0.01 km^{2} (2.5 acres) or 0.2% is either rivers or lakes.

Of the built up area, industrial buildings made up 1.4% of the total area while housing and buildings made up 17.5% and transportation infrastructure made up 3.5%. Power and water infrastructure as well as other special developed areas made up 2.9% of the area Out of the forested land, 41.4% of the total land area is heavily forested and 1.4% is covered with orchards or small clusters of trees. Of the agricultural land, 16.7% is used for growing crops and 9.7% is pastures, while 4.3% is used for orchards or vine crops. All the water in the municipality is flowing water.

It consists of the villages of Corcelles and Cormondrèche and the Serroue forest clearing which contains a number of individual houses.

== Coat of arms ==
The blazon of the municipal coat of arms is In argent with a Couteau Or issuant from the dexter, three Vines proper, eradicated Vert, fructed Purpure; the Couteau washed by a Lake Azure and in the sinister canton a Forest Mark: two Ribs between two Cs affrontée in gules.

== Demographics ==
Corcelles-Cormondrèche had a population (as of 2019) of 4,794. As of 2008, 17.9% of the population are resident foreign nationals. Over the last 10 years (2000–2010) the population has changed at a rate of 18.2%. It has changed at a rate of 15.2% due to migration and at a rate of 2% due to births and deaths.

Most of the population (as of 2000) speaks French (3,426 or 87.5%) as their first language, German is the second most common (202 or 5.2%) and Italian is the third (88 or 2.2%). There are 2 people who speak Romansh.

As of 2008, the population was 48.3% male and 51.7% female. The population was made up of 1,777 Swiss men (38.4% of the population) and 456 (9.9%) non-Swiss men. There were 2,027 Swiss women (43.9%) and 362 (7.8%) non-Swiss women. Of the population in the municipality, 708 or about 18.1% were born in Corcelles-Cormondrèche and lived there in 2000. There were 1,481 or 37.8% who were born in the same canton, while 922 or 23.6% were born somewhere else in Switzerland, and 705 or 18.0% were born outside of Switzerland.

As of 2000, children and teenagers (0–19 years old) make up 23.6% of the population, while adults (20–64 years old) make up 58% and seniors (over 64 years old) make up 18.4%.

As of 2000, there were 1,471 people who were single and never married in the municipality. There were 1,945 married individuals, 268 widows or widowers and 230 individuals who are divorced.

As of 2000, there were 1,688 private households in the municipality, and an average of 2.3 persons per household. There were 565 households that consist of only one person and 91 households with five or more people. In 2000, a total of 1,631 apartments (92.5% of the total) were permanently occupied, while 85 apartments (4.8%) were seasonally occupied and 47 apartments (2.7%) were empty. As of 2009, the construction rate of new housing units was 0.9 new units per 1000 residents. The vacancy rate for the municipality, in 2010, was 0.15%.

The historical population is given in the following chart:

== Sights ==
The entire urban village of Corcelles is designated as part of the Inventory of Swiss Heritage Sites.

== Politics ==
In the 2007 federal election the most popular party was the SP which received 26.18% of the vote. The next three most popular parties were the SVP (19.96%), the FDP (18.19%) and the LPS Party (15.23%). In the federal election, a total of 1,598 votes were cast, and the voter turnout was 55.9%.

== Economy ==
As of 2010, Corcelles-Cormondrèche had an unemployment rate of 5.4%. As of 2008, there were 29 people employed in the primary economic sector and about 12 businesses involved in this sector. 425 people were employed in the secondary sector and there were 48 businesses in this sector. 422 people were employed in the tertiary sector, with 91 businesses in this sector. There were 1,881 residents of the municipality who were employed in some capacity, of which females made up 44.3% of the workforce.

In 2008 the total number of full-time equivalent jobs was 758. The number of jobs in the primary sector was 20, of which 12 were in agriculture and 8 were in forestry or lumber production. The number of jobs in the secondary sector was 404 of which 196 or (48.5%) were in manufacturing and 54 (13.4%) were in construction. The number of jobs in the tertiary sector was 334. In the tertiary sector; 107 or 32.0% were in wholesale or retail sales or the repair of motor vehicles, 18 or 5.4% were in the movement and storage of goods, 13 or 3.9% were in a hotel or restaurant, 4 or 1.2% were in the information industry, 3 or 0.9% were the insurance or financial industry, 40 or 12.0% were technical professionals or scientists, 23 or 6.9% were in education and 73 or 21.9% were in health care.

In 2000, there were 622 workers who commuted into the municipality and 1,517 workers who commuted away. The municipality is a net exporter of workers, with about 2.4 workers leaving the municipality for every one entering. Of the working population, 20.8% used public transportation to get to work, and 62.7% used a private car.

== Religion ==
From the 2000 census, 1,160 or 29.6% were Roman Catholic, while 1,560 or 39.9% belonged to the Swiss Reformed Church. Of the rest of the population, there were 25 members of an Orthodox church (or about 0.64% of the population), there were 5 individuals (or about 0.13% of the population) who belonged to the Christian Catholic Church, and there were 211 individuals (or about 5.39% of the population) who belonged to another Christian church. There were 4 individuals (or about 0.10% of the population) who were Jewish, and 69 (or about 1.76% of the population) who were Islamic. There was 1 person who was Buddhist, 2 individuals who were Hindu and 5 individuals who belonged to another church. 820 (or about 20.95% of the population) belonged to no church, are agnostic or atheist, and 155 individuals (or about 3.96% of the population) did not answer the question.

== Education ==
In Corcelles-Cormondrèche about 1,409 or (36.0%) of the population have completed non-mandatory upper secondary education, and 791 or (20.2%) have completed additional higher education (either university or a Fachhochschule). Of the 791 who completed tertiary schooling, 52.0% were Swiss men, 30.7% were Swiss women, 11.0% were non-Swiss men and 6.3% were non-Swiss women.

In the canton of Neuchâtel most municipalities provide two years of non-mandatory kindergarten, followed by five years of mandatory primary education. The next four years of mandatory secondary education is provided at thirteen larger secondary schools, which many students travel out of their home municipality to attend. During the 2010-11 school year, there were 4.5 kindergarten classes with a total of 89 students in Corcelles-Cormondrèche. In the same year, there were 13 primary classes with a total of 267 students.

As of 2000, there was one student in Corcelles-Cormondrèche who came from another municipality, while 368 residents attended schools outside the municipality.

== Transportation ==
Corcelles-Cormondrèche is served by the Corcelles-Peseux railway station on the Neuchâtel–Le Locle-Col-des-Roches line, with frequent service to Neuchâtel.

== Notable people ==
- Onésime Clerc, Russian naturalist, born in Corcelles
