= Boudry District =

Coordinates: 46°57′N 6°50′E

Boudry District District de Boudry
- District
- Country: Switzerland
- Canton: Neuchâtel
- Capital: Boudry
- Dissolved: 1 January 2018

Area
  - Total: 105.58 km^{2} (40.76 sq mi)

Population (2017)
  - Total: 40,701
  - Density: 385.50/km^{2} (998.44/sq mi)
- Time zone: UTC+1 (CET)
  - Summer (DST): UTC+2 (CEST)
- Municipalities: 7

Boudry District was one of the six districts of the canton of Neuchâtel, Switzerland, until the district level was eliminated on 1 January 2018. It had a population of 40,701. The district capital was the town of Boudry.

== Municipalities ==
The district consists of the following municipalities:

Coat of arms	Municipality	Population (31 December 2020)	Area km^{2}
Boudry	Boudry	6,193	16.76
Corcelles-Cormondrèche	Corcelles-Cormondrèche	4,754	4.85
Cortaillod	Cortaillod	4,697	3.68
La Grande-Béroche	La Grande-Béroche	14,286	42.25
Milvignes	Milvignes	9,063	8.78
Peseux	Peseux	5,796	3.39
Rochefort	Rochefort	1,291	25.85
	Total	40,701	105.62

== Mergers and name changes ==
- The municipalities of Auvernier, Bôle and Colombier merged on 1 January 2013 into the new municipality of Milvignes.
- The municipality Brot-Dessous merged into Rochefort on 1 January 2016.
- On 1 January 2018 the former municipalities of Bevaix, Saint-Aubin-Sauges, Gorgier, Vaumarcus, Montalchez and Fresens merged into the new municipality of La Grande-Béroche.

== Demographics ==
Boudry District had a population (as of 2017) of 40,701.

Most of the population (as of 2000) speaks French (31,695 or 86.3%) as their first language, German is the second most common (1,663 or 4.5%) and Italian is the third (1,007 or 2.7%). There are 21 people who speak Romansh.

As of 2008, the population was 48.8% male and 51.2% female. The population was made up of 14,701 Swiss men (37.8% of the population) and 4,269 (11.0%) non-Swiss men. There were 16,480 Swiss women (42.4%) and 3,400 (8.8%) non-Swiss women.

Of the population in the district, 7,421 or about 20.2% were born in Boudry and lived there in 2000. There were 12,122 or 33.0% who were born in the same canton, while 8,165 or 22.2% were born somewhere else in Switzerland, and 7,764 or 21.1% were born outside of Switzerland.

As of 2000, there were 14,186 people who were single and never married in the district. There were 18,074 married individuals, 2,255 widows or widowers and 2,206 individuals who are divorced.

There were 5,151 households that consist of only one person and 823 households with five or more people.

The historical population is given in the following chart:

== Politics ==
In the 2007 federal election the most popular party was the SP which received 24.74% of the vote. The next three most popular parties were the SVP (22.56%), the LPS Party (15.53%) and the FDP (14.97%). In the federal election, a total of 12,728 votes were cast, and the voter turnout was 51.9%.

== Religion ==
From the 2000 census, 11,032 or 30.0% were Roman Catholic, while 14,370 or 39.1% belonged to the Swiss Reformed Church. Of the rest of the population, there were 252 members of an Orthodox church (or about 0.69% of the population), there were 60 individuals (or about 0.16% of the population) who belonged to the Christian Catholic Church, and there were 2,289 individuals (or about 6.23% of the population) who belonged to another Christian church. There were 52 individuals (or about 0.14% of the population) who were Jewish, and 638 (or about 1.74% of the population) who were Islamic. There were 36 individuals who were Buddhist, 14 individuals who were Hindu and 41 individuals who belonged to another church. 7,447 (or about 20.28% of the population) belonged to no church, are agnostic or atheist, and 1,610 individuals (or about 4.38% of the population) did not answer the question.

== Education ==
In Boudry about 13,610 or (37.1%) of the population have completed non-mandatory upper secondary education, and 5,466 or (14.9%) have completed additional higher education (either university or a Fachhochschule). Of the 5,466 who completed tertiary schooling, 55.0% were Swiss men, 27.5% were Swiss women, 10.9% were non-Swiss men and 6.6% were non-Swiss women.

In the canton of Neuchâtel most municipalities provide two years of non-mandatory kindergarten, followed by five years of mandatory primary education. The next four years of mandatory secondary education is provided at thirteen larger secondary schools, which many students travel out of their home municipality to attend. During the 2010-11 school year, there were 40.5 kindergarten classes with a total of 758 students in District de Boudry. In the same year, there were 110 primary classes with a total of 2,135 students.
