= Montalchez =

- Former municipality
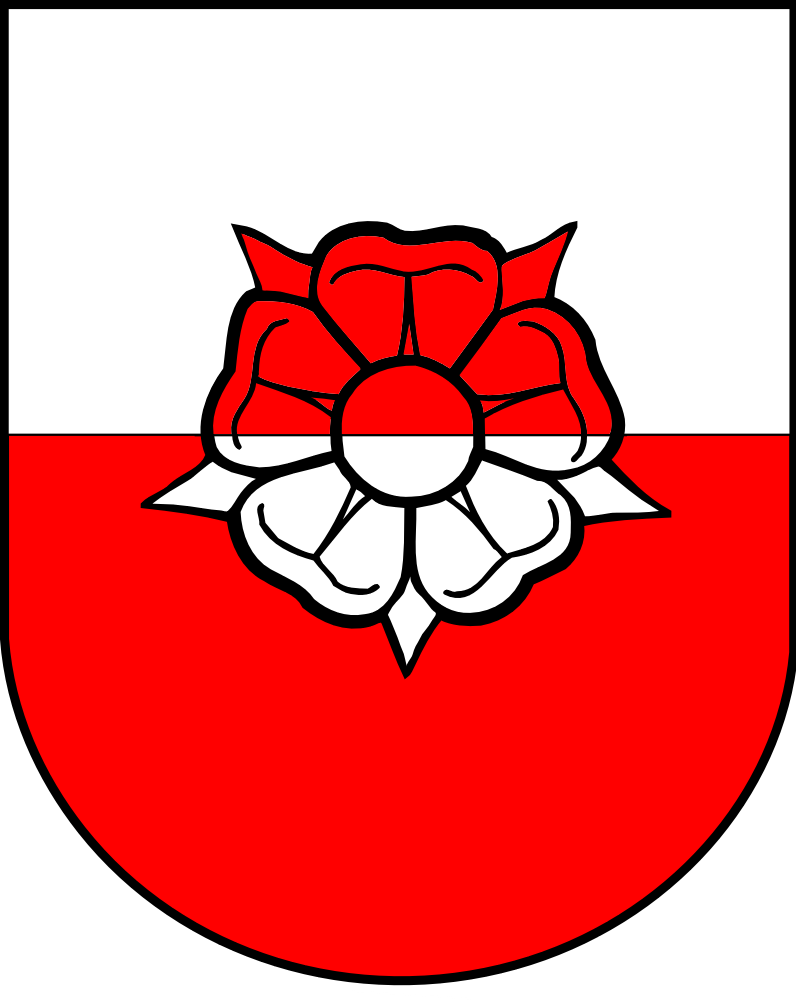
- Coat of arms
- Location of Montalchez
- Location within Switzerland Location within Canton of Neuchâtel
- Coordinates: 46°54′N 6°45′E
- Country: Switzerland
- Canton: Neuchâtel
- District: Boudry

Area
  - Total: 6.41 km^{2} (2.47 sq mi)
- Elevation: 656 m (2,152 ft)

Population (December 2007)
  - Total: 213
  - Density: 33.2/km^{2} (86.1/sq mi)
- Time zone: UTC+01:00 (CET)
  - Summer (DST): UTC+02:00 (CEST)
- Postal code: 2027
- SFOS number: 6411
- ISO 3166 code: CH-NE
- Surrounded by: Fresens, Gorgier, Provence (VD), Saint-Aubin-Sauges
- Website: SFSO statistics

Montalchez is a former municipality in the district of Boudry in the canton of Neuchâtel in Switzerland. On 1 January 2018 the former municipalities of Bevaix, Saint-Aubin-Sauges, Gorgier, Vaumarcus, Montalchez and Fresens merged into the new municipality of La Grande-Béroche.

== History ==
Montalchez is first mentioned in 1340 as villa de Montallichie.

== Geography ==
Montalchez has an area, as of 2009, of 6.4 square kilometers (2.5 mi^{2}). Of this area, 3.72 km^{2} (1.44 mi^{2}) or 57.9% is used for agricultural purposes, while 2.41 km^{2} (0.93 mi^{2}) or 37.5% is forested. Of the rest of the land, 0.27 km^{2} (0.10 mi^{2}) or 4.2% is settled (buildings or roads) and 0.01 km^{2} (2.5 acres) or 0.2% is unproductive land.

Of the built up area, housing and buildings made up 2.3% and transportation infrastructure made up 1.6%. Out of the forested land, 33.8% of the total land area is heavily forested and 3.7% is covered with orchards or small clusters of trees. Of the agricultural land, 17.9% is used for growing crops and 22.1% is pastures, while 1.2% is used for orchards or vine crops and 16.7% is used for alpine pastures.

The municipality is located in the Boudry district. It consists of the village of Montalchez and the hamlet of Erperens.

== Coat of arms ==
The blazon of the municipal coat of arms is Per fess Argent and Gules, a Rose counterchanged.

== Demographics ==
Montalchez has a population (as of December 2020) of 240. As of 2008, 4.4% of the population are resident foreign nationals. Over the last 10 years (2000–2010 ) the population has changed at a rate of 37.6%. It has changed at a rate of 27.1% due to migration and at a rate of 10% due to births and deaths.

Most of the population (as of 2000) speaks French (179 or 97.3%) as their first language, German is the second most common (3 or 1.6%) and English is the third (1 or 0.5%).

As of 2008, the population was 52.5% male and 47.5% female. The population was made up of 122 Swiss men (51.7% of the population) and 2 (0.8%) non-Swiss men. There were 105 Swiss women (44.5%) and 7 (3.0%) non-Swiss women. Of the population in the municipality, 75 or about 40.8% were born in Montalchez and lived there in 2000. There were 43 or 23.4% who were born in the same canton, while 43 or 23.4% were born somewhere else in Switzerland, and 15 or 8.2% were born outside of Switzerland.

As of 2000, children and teenagers (0–19 years old) make up 21.2% of the population, while adults (20–64 years old) make up 60.3% and seniors (over 64 years old) make up 18.5%.

As of 2000, there were 78 people who were single and never married in the municipality. There were 87 married individuals, 11 widows or widowers and 8 individuals who are divorced.

As of 2000, there were 72 private households in the municipality, and an average of 2.5 persons per household. There were 17 households that consist of only one person and 5 households with five or more people. In 2000, a total of 70 apartments (63.1% of the total) were permanently occupied, while 28 apartments (25.2%) were seasonally occupied and 13 apartments (11.7%) were empty. As of 2009, the construction rate of new housing units was 21.4 new units per 1000 residents.

The historical population is given in the following chart:

== Politics ==
In the 2007 federal election the most popular party was the SVP which received 29.15% of the vote. The next three most popular parties were the LPS Party (18.39%), the SP (15.7%) and the FDP (13.23%). In the federal election, a total of 91 votes were cast, and the voter turnout was 54.5%.

== Economy ==
As of 2010, Montalchez had an unemployment rate of 2%. As of 2008, there were 34 people employed in the primary economic sector and about 11 businesses involved in this sector. No one was employed in the secondary sector. 10 people were employed in the tertiary sector, with 6 businesses in this sector. There were 104 residents of the municipality who were employed in some capacity, of which females made up 39.4% of the workforce.

In 2008 the total number of full-time equivalent jobs was 35. The number of jobs in the primary sector was 26, all of which were in agriculture. There were no jobs in the secondary sector. The number of jobs in the tertiary sector was 9, of which 6 were in wholesale or retail sales or the repair of motor vehicles, 2 were in a hotel or restaurant and 1 was in the information industry.

In 2000, there were 71 workers who commuted away from the municipality. Of the working population, 5.8% used public transportation to get to work, and 67.3% used a private car.

== Religion ==
From the 2000 census, 18 or 9.8% were Roman Catholic, while 128 or 69.6% belonged to the Swiss Reformed Church. Of the rest of the population, there were 24 individuals (or about 13.04% of the population) who belonged to another Christian church. 20 (or about 10.87% of the population) belonged to no church, are agnostic or atheist, and 6 individuals (or about 3.26% of the population) did not answer the question.

== Education ==
In Montalchez about 69 or (37.5%) of the population have completed non-mandatory upper secondary education, and 14 or (7.6%) have completed additional higher education (either university or a Fachhochschule). Of the 14 who completed tertiary schooling, 57.1% were Swiss men, 14.3% were Swiss women.

In the canton of Neuchâtel most municipalities provide two years of non-mandatory kindergarten, followed by five years of mandatory primary education. The next four years of mandatory secondary education is provided at thirteen larger secondary schools, which many students travel out of their home municipality to attend. Both the kindergarten and the primary school are combined with Fresens. During the 2010-11 school year, there was one kindergarten class with a total of 23 students between the municipalities. In the same year, there was one primary class with a total of 16 students.

As of 2000, there were 20 students from Montalchez who attended schools outside the municipality.
