= Bevaix =

- Former municipality
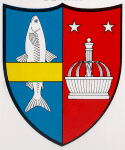
- Coat of arms
- Location of Bevaix
- Location within Switzerland Location within Canton of Neuchâtel
- Coordinates: 46°56′N 6°49′E
- Country: Switzerland
- Canton: Neuchâtel
- District: Boudry

Area
  - Total: 10.76 km^{2} (4.15 sq mi)
- Elevation: 475 m (1,558 ft)
- Highest elevation (Petite Ecoeurne): 1,335 m (4,380 ft)
- Lowest elevation (Lake Neuchâtel): 429 m (1,407 ft)

Population (December 2007)
  - Total: 3,753
  - Density: 348.8/km^{2} (903.4/sq mi)
- Time zone: UTC+01:00 (CET)
  - Summer (DST): UTC+02:00 (CEST)
- Postal code: 2022
- SFOS number: 6402
- ISO 3166 code: CH-NE
- Surrounded by: Boudry, Chevroux (VD), Cortaillod, Forel (FR), Gorgier
- Website: www.bevaix.ch

Bevaix is a former municipality in the district of Boudry in the canton of Neuchâtel in Switzerland. On 1 January 2018 the former municipalities of Bevaix, Saint-Aubin-Sauges, Gorgier, Vaumarcus, Montalchez and Fresens merged into the new municipality of La Grande-Béroche.

== History ==
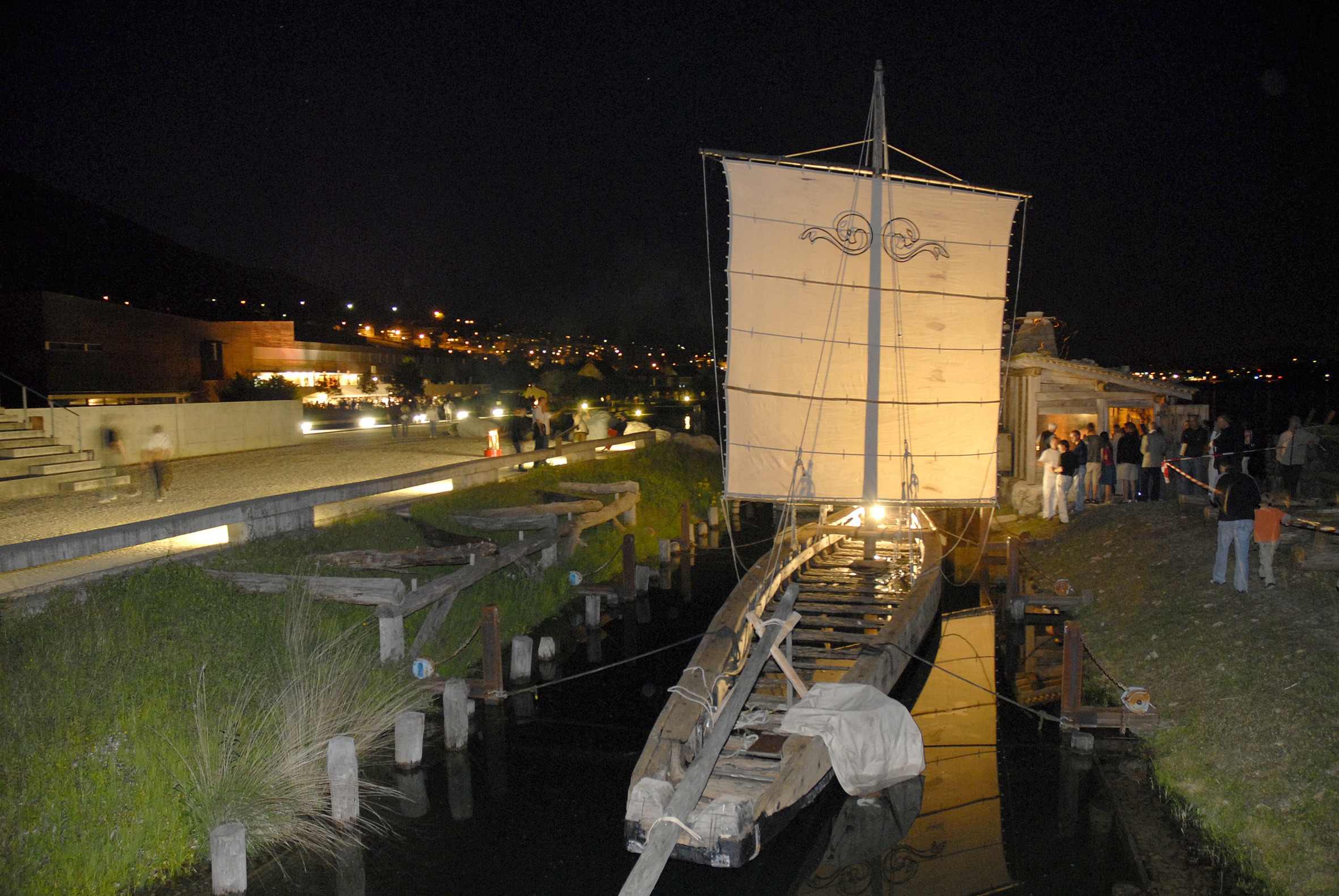
Reconstruction of the Gallo-Roman Bevaix boat

Bevaix is first mentioned in 998 as in villa Bevacensi. In 1139 it was mentioned as Betuaci.

The village of Bevaix is sited in front of a small plateau, near Lake Neuchâtel, on a location showing both Bronze Age and Neolithic settlement and a priory dating to 998. The discovery nearby of several dugout canoes and boats illuminated techniques of shipbuilding in Gallo-Roman times. The village was predominantly agricultural until the building of a railway station in 1860, and the drainage of the surrounding wetlands around 1900, when the area became increasingly residential. Local industry focuses on microtechnology.

== Geography ==
Aerial view (1954)

Bevaix has an area, as of 2009, of 10.8 square kilometers (4.2 mi^{2}). Of this area, 3.68 km^{2} (1.42 mi^{2}) or 34.1% is used for agricultural purposes, while 5.08 km^{2} (1.96 mi^{2}) or 47.1% is forested. Of the rest of the land, 1.97 km^{2} (0.76 mi^{2}) or 18.3% is settled (buildings or roads) and 0.08 km^{2} (20 acres) or 0.7% is unproductive land.

Of the built up area, housing and buildings made up 10.2% and transportation infrastructure made up 4.3%. Power and water infrastructure as well as other special developed areas made up 2.3% of the area. Out of the forested land, 45.6% of the total land area is heavily forested and 1.5% is covered with orchards or small clusters of trees. Of the agricultural land, 18.7% is used for growing crops and 8.2% is pastures, while 5.8% is used for orchards or vine crops and 1.4% is used for alpine pastures.

The municipality is located in the Boudry district, on a small, marshy plateau near Lake Neuchâtel.

The proposed merger of the municipalities of Bevaix, Boudry and Cortaillod was rejected by the residents.

== Coat of arms ==
The blazon of the municipal coat of arms is Impalled, Azure a Fish haurient Argent and a Bar Or, and Gules, a Fountain Argent and in chief two Mullets of Five of the same.

== Demographics ==
Bevaix has a population (as of December 2020) of 3,784. As of 2008, 16.0% of the population are resident foreign nationals. Over the last 10 years (2000–2010) the population has changed at a rate of 7.8%. It has changed at a rate of 4.2% due to migration and at a rate of 1.5% due to births and deaths.

Most of the population (as of 2000) speaks French (3,120 or 86.6%) as their first language, German is the second most common (183 or 5.1%) and Italian is the third (86 or 2.4%). There are 5 people who speak Romansh.

As of 2008, the population was 50.0% male and 50.0% female. The population was made up of 1,583 Swiss men (41.3% of the population) and 335 (8.7%) non-Swiss men. There were 1,649 Swiss women (43.0%) and 269 (7.0%) non-Swiss women.

Of the population in the municipality, 767 or about 21.3% were born in Bevaix and lived there in 2000. There were 1,147 or 31.8% who were born in the same canton, while 836 or 23.2% were born somewhere else in Switzerland, and 741 or 20.6% were born outside of Switzerland.

As of 2000, children and teenagers (0–19 years old) make up 25% of the population, while adults (20–64 years old) make up 59.7% and seniors (over 64 years old) make up 15.3%. As of 2000, there were 1,365 people who were single and never married in the municipality. There were 1,828 married individuals, 218 widows or widowers and 192 individuals who are divorced.

As of 2000, there were 1,443 private households in the municipality, and an average of 2.4 persons per household. There were 401 households that consist of only one person and 78 households with five or more people. In 2000, a total of 1,399 apartments (91.8% of the total) were permanently occupied, while 96 apartments (6.3%) were seasonally occupied and 29 apartments (1.9%) were empty. As of 2009, the construction rate of new housing units was 0.5 new units per 1000 residents. The vacancy rate for the municipality, in 2010, was 1.35%.

The historical population is given in the following chart:

== Heritage sites of national significance ==
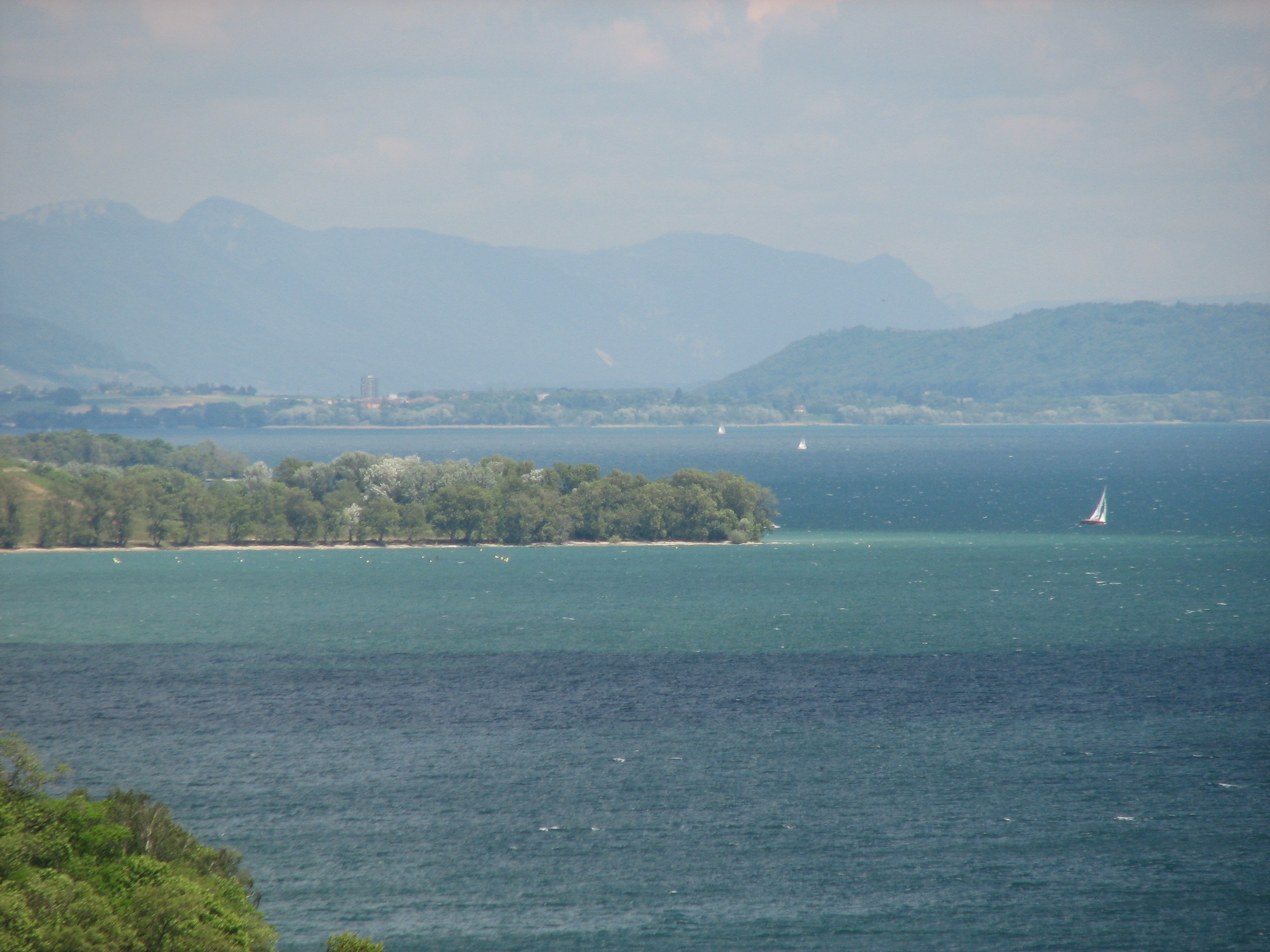
Baie De Bevaix site

The prehistoric lake shore settlement at Baie De Bevaix and the Neolithic funerary and cultural center of Treytel-A Sugiez are listed as Swiss heritage site of national significance.

=== World heritage site ===
It is home to the L’Abbaye 2 site, a prehistoric pile-dwelling (or stilt house) settlements that is part of the Prehistoric Pile dwellings around the Alps UNESCO World Heritage Site.

L'Abbaye 2 is a Bronze Age submerged site located near the L'Abbaye 1 Neolithic site. The former village at L'Abbaye 2 is about 180 meters (590 ft) from the lake shore and consisted of a number of stilt houses. It has been dendrochronologically dated to 1040-986 BC. The village site covers an area of about 150 by 80 m (490 by 260 ft) and was probably connected to the shore by a foot bridge. About 400 Bronze Age objects have been discovered in the water around the village.

== Politics ==
In the 2007 federal election the most popular party was the SP which received 24.74% of the vote. The next three most popular parties were the SVP (21.95%), the FDP (16.07%) and the LPS Party (15.58%). In the federal election, a total of 1,286 votes were cast, and the voter turnout was 52.2%.

== Economy ==
As of 2010, Bevaix had an unemployment rate of 3.8%. As of 2008, there were 65 people employed in the primary economic sector and about 22 businesses involved in this sector. 443 people were employed in the secondary sector and there were 52 businesses in this sector. 629 people were employed in the tertiary sector, with 99 businesses in this sector. There were 1,788 residents of the municipality who were employed in some capacity, of which females made up 43.0% of the workforce.

In 2008 the total number of full-time equivalent jobs was 924. The number of jobs in the primary sector was 42, of which 36 were in agriculture, 5 were in forestry or lumber production and 1 was in fishing or fisheries. The number of jobs in the secondary sector was 417 of which 339 or (81.3%) were in manufacturing and 79 (18.9%) were in construction. The number of jobs in the tertiary sector was 465. In the tertiary sector; 120 or 25.8% were in wholesale or retail sales or the repair of motor vehicles, 12 or 2.6% were in the movement and storage of goods, 42 or 9.0% were in a hotel or restaurant, 33 or 7.1% were in the information industry, 3 or 0.6% were the insurance or financial industry, 26 or 5.6% were technical professionals or scientists, 22 or 4.7% were in education and 117 or 25.2% were in health care.

In 2000, there were 660 workers who commuted into the municipality and 1,295 workers who commuted away. The municipality is a net exporter of workers, with about 2.0 workers leaving the municipality for every one entering. About 2.7% of the workforce coming into Bevaix are coming from outside Switzerland. Of the working population, 10.5% used public transportation to get to work, and 67.2% used a private car.

== Religion ==
From the 2000 census, 1,069 or 29.7% were Roman Catholic, while 1,490 or 41.4% belonged to the Swiss Reformed Church. Of the rest of the population, there were 42 members of an Orthodox church (or about 1.17% of the population), there were 5 individuals (or about 0.14% of the population) who belonged to the Christian Catholic Church, and there were 131 individuals (or about 3.64% of the population) who belonged to another Christian church. There were 6 individuals (or about 0.17% of the population) who were Jewish, and 51 (or about 1.42% of the population) who were Islamic. There were 2 individuals who were Buddhist and 2 individuals who belonged to another church. 726 (or about 20.15% of the population) belonged to no church, are agnostic or atheist, and 142 individuals (or about 3.94% of the population) did not answer the question.

== Education ==
In Bevaix about 1,351 or (37.5%) of the population have completed non-mandatory upper secondary education, and 540 or (15.0%) have completed additional higher education (either university or a Fachhochschule). Of the 540 who completed tertiary schooling, 55.2% were Swiss men, 26.3% were Swiss women, 12.6% were non-Swiss men and 5.9% were non-Swiss women.

In the canton of Neuchâtel most municipalities provide two years of non-mandatory kindergarten, followed by five years of mandatory primary education. The next four years of mandatory secondary education is provided at thirteen larger secondary schools, which many students travel out of their home municipality to attend. During the 2010-11 school year, there were 5 kindergarten classes with a total of 86 students in Bevaix. In the same year, there were 13 primary classes with a total of 257 students.

As of 2000, there were 26 students in Bevaix who came from another municipality, while 345 residents attended schools outside the municipality.

== See also ==
- Bevaix boat, a Gallo-Roman shipwreck at the Lake of Neuchatel
