= Saint-Aubin-Sauges =

- Former municipality
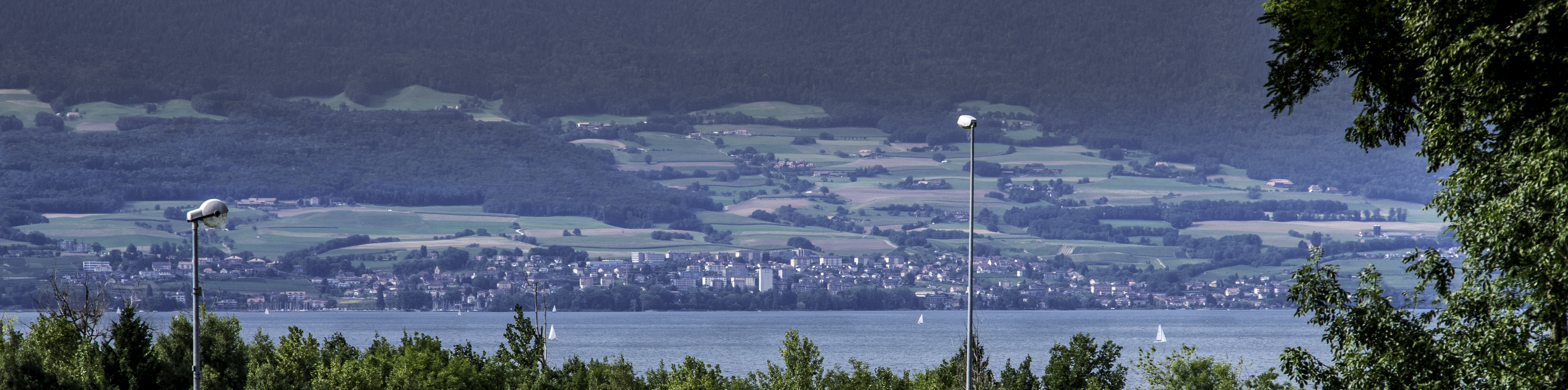

- Coat of arms
- Location of Saint-Aubin-Sauges
- Location within Switzerland Location within Canton of Neuchâtel
- Coordinates: 46°54′N 6°46′E
- Country: Switzerland
- Canton: Neuchâtel
- District: Boudry

Area
  - Total: 7.71 km^{2} (2.98 sq mi)
- Elevation: 469 m (1,539 ft)

Population (December 2007)
  - Total: 2,460
  - Density: 319/km^{2} (826/sq mi)
- Time zone: UTC+01:00 (CET)
  - Summer (DST): UTC+02:00 (CEST)
- Postal code: 2024
- SFOS number: 6414
- ISO 3166 code: CH-NE
- Surrounded by: Estavayer-le-Lac (FR), Fresens, Gorgier, Montalchez, Vaumarcus
- Website: saint-aubin-sauges.ch

Saint-Aubin-Sauges is a former municipality in the district of Boudry in the canton of Neuchâtel in Switzerland. On 1 January 2018 the former municipalities of Bevaix, Saint-Aubin-Sauges, Gorgier, Vaumarcus, Montalchez and Fresens merged into the new municipality of La Grande-Béroche.

== History ==
Saint-Aubin-Sauges is first mentioned in 1176 as Sancti Albini. In 1340 it was mentioned as villa de Sauges.

== Geography ==
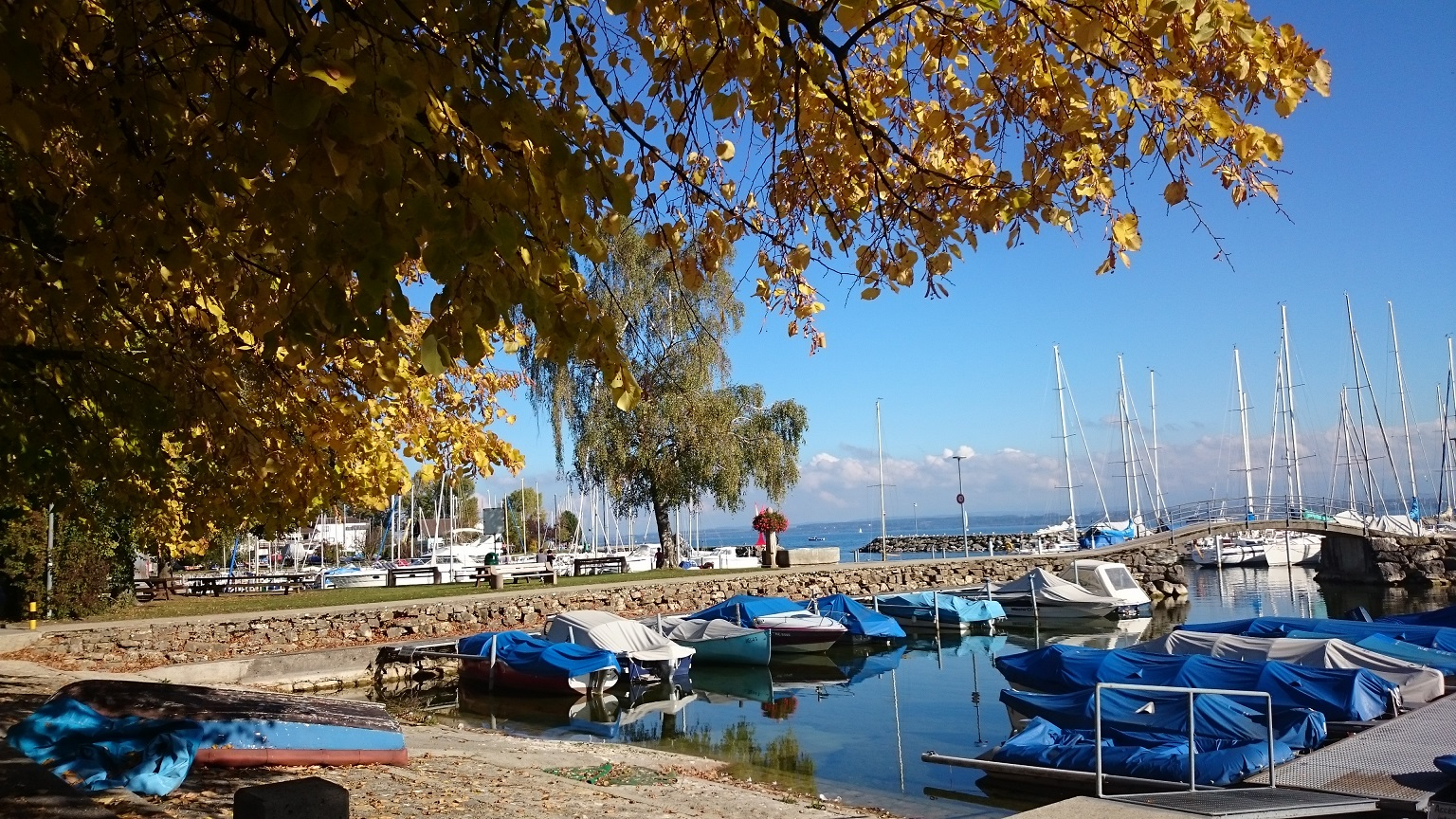
Port Conty in Saint-Aubin-Sauges on Lake Neuchatel

Aerial view (1954)

Saint-Aubin-Sauges has an area, as of 2009, of 7.7 square kilometers (3.0 mi^{2}). Of this area, 3.68 km^{2} (1.42 mi^{2}) or 47.7% is used for agricultural purposes, while 2.95 km^{2} (1.14 mi^{2}) or 38.3% is forested. Of the rest of the land, 1.04 km^{2} (0.40 mi^{2}) or 13.5% is settled (buildings or roads) and 0.02 km^{2} (4.9 acres) or 0.3% is unproductive land.

Of the built up area, housing and buildings made up 7.8% and transportation infrastructure made up 3.5%. Out of the forested land, 35.0% of the total land area is heavily forested and 3.2% is covered with orchards or small clusters of trees. Of the agricultural land, 16.9% is used for growing crops and 13.6% is pastures, while 3.9% is used for orchards or vine crops and 13.4% is used for alpine pastures.

The municipality is located in the Boudry district, in the La Béroche region. It stretched from the shores of Lake Neuchatel to an elevation of 1,436 m (4,711 ft). It consists of the villages of Saint-Aubin and Sauges, which merged in 1888.

== Coat of arms ==
The blazon of the municipal coat of arms is Impaled, per pale Argent and Gules a Rose counterchanged, and per pale Argent three bars Gules and Gules a Rose counterchanged.

== Demographics ==
Saint-Aubin-Sauges has a population (as of December 2020) of 2,399. As of 2008, 21.2% of the population are resident foreign nationals. Over the last 10 years (2000–2010 ) the population has changed at a rate of 0.8%. It has changed at a rate of 0.6% due to migration and at a rate of 1% due to births and deaths.

Most of the population (as of 2000) speaks French (2,054 or 84.7%) as their first language, Portuguese is the second most common (106 or 4.4%) and German is the third (105 or 4.3%). There are 90 people who speak Italian and 1 person who speaks Romansh.

As of 2008, the population was 47.7% male and 52.3% female. The population was made up of 896 Swiss men (36.9% of the population) and 261 (10.8%) non-Swiss men. There were 1,054 Swiss women (43.4%) and 215 (8.9%) non-Swiss women. Of the population in the municipality, 587 or about 24.2% were born in Saint-Aubin-Sauges and lived there in 2000. There were 603 or 24.9% who were born in the same canton, while 592 or 24.4% were born somewhere else in Switzerland, and 582 or 24.0% were born outside of Switzerland.

As of 2000, children and teenagers (0–19 years old) make up 23.3% of the population, while adults (20–64 years old) make up 59.7% and seniors (over 64 years old) make up 17%.

As of 2000, there were 939 people who were single and never married in the municipality. There were 1,169 married individuals, 166 widows or widowers and 152 individuals who are divorced.

As of 2000, there were 1,008 private households in the municipality, and an average of 2.3 persons per household. There were 336 households that consist of only one person and 65 households with five or more people. In 2000, a total of 986 apartments (85.1% of the total) were permanently occupied, while 138 apartments (11.9%) were seasonally occupied and 35 apartments (3.0%) were empty. As of 2009, the construction rate of new housing units was 0.4 new units per 1000 residents. The vacancy rate for the municipality, in 2010, was 0.81%.

The historical population is given in the following chart:

== Heritage sites of national significance ==
The Le Béroche, a Gallo-Roman settlement, and the Neolithic settlement at Port Conty / Tivoli are listed as Swiss heritage site of national significance.

=== World Heritage Site ===
It is home to the Port-Conty prehistoric pile-dwelling (or stilt house) settlement that is part of the Prehistoric Pile dwellings around the Alps UNESCO World Heritage Site.

Port-Conty has two Neolithic settlements. The first is a Late Cortaillod or Port-Conty type Cortaillod village. One piece of timber from this site has been dated to 3574. The second village is a Late Horgen village. Five of the piles are from 3160 and 3159, and two piles are from 3064 and 3062. The site was discovered in 1860 by F. Troyon, who originally thought it was a Bronze Age village. Further excavations in the late 19th and early 20th century found that it was a Neolithic site. In 1929-1932, P. Vouga dug a long (55 m [180 ft]) 1 to 1.5 m (3.3 to 4.9 ft) deep trench to examine a single layer. He found three archaeological horizons which were from the Middle Neolithic, the Late Neolithic and the end of the Late Neolithic. Based on his study, it appears that the site was covered by an artificial mound which was 20 m × 10 m (66 ft × 33 ft) and about 70 cm (2 ft 4 in) deep. It was built in two stages, with a layer of branches between the layers.

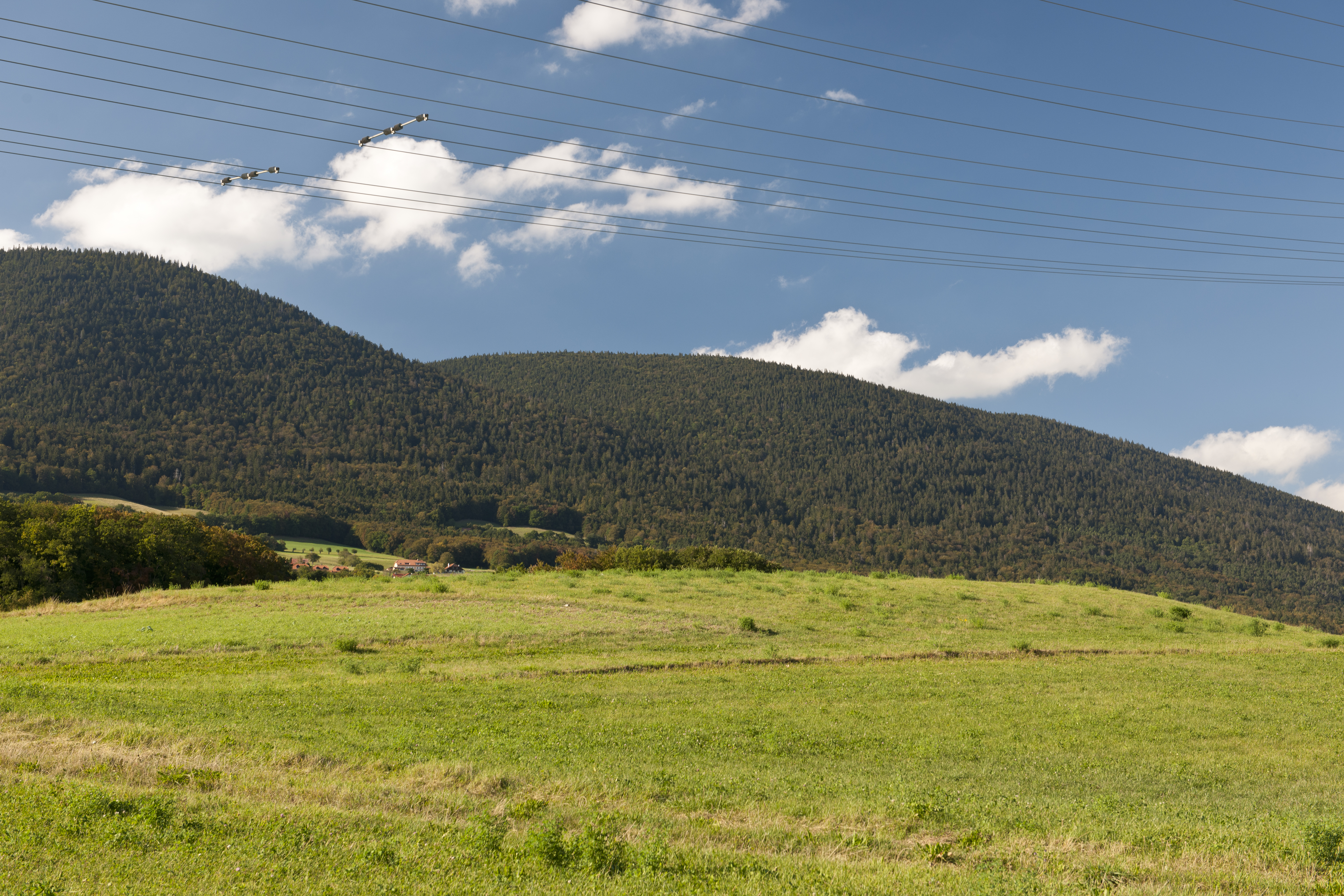
La Béroche site

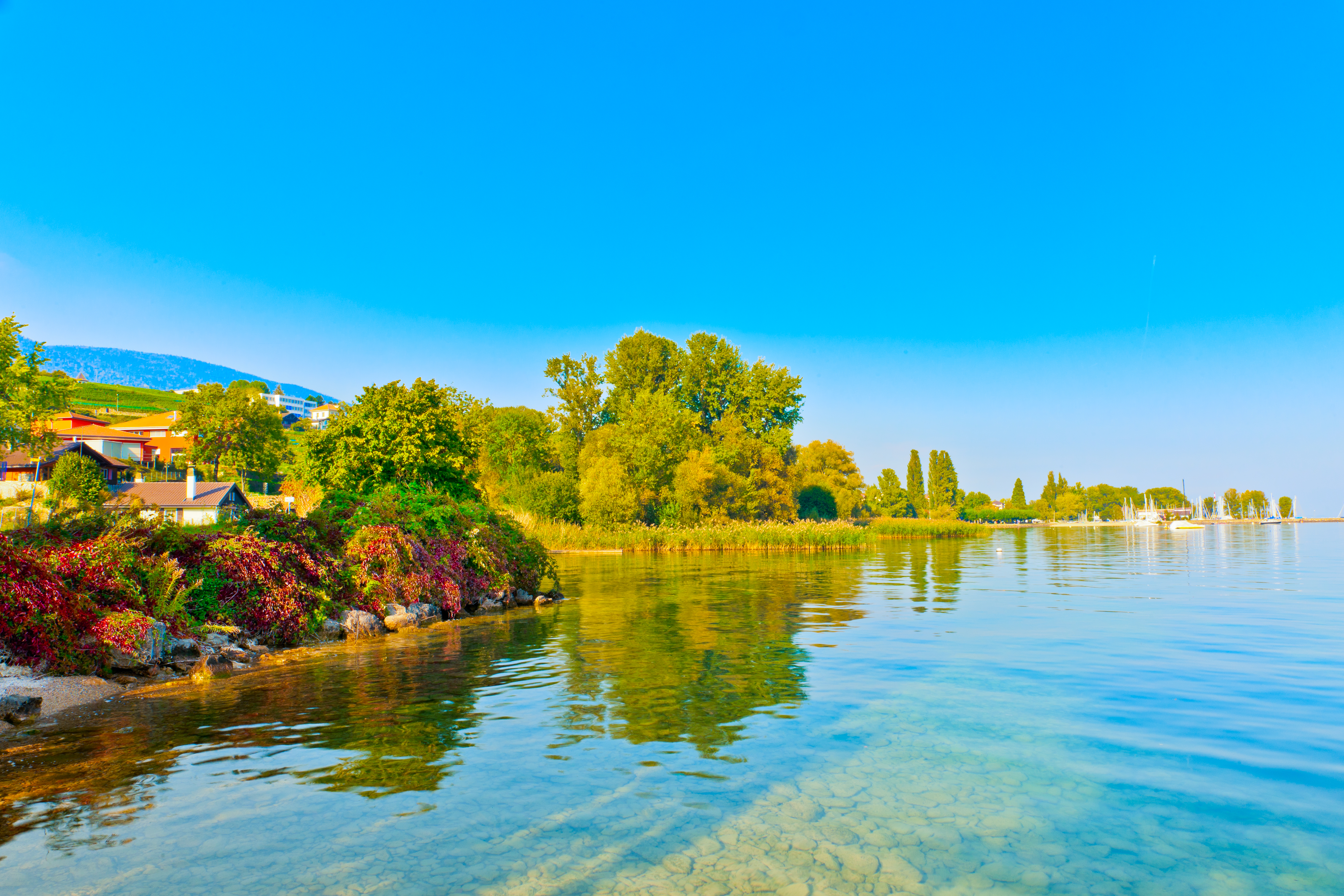
Port Conty

== Twin Town ==
Saint-Aubin-Sauges is twinned with the town of Untersiggenthal, Solothurn.

== Politics ==
In the 2007 federal election the most popular party was the SP which received 27.34% of the vote. The next three most popular parties were the LPS Party (18.64%), the SVP (18.46%) and the FDP (10.68%). In the federal election, a total of 779 votes were cast, and the voter turnout was 50.7%.

== Economy ==
As of 2010, Saint-Aubin-Sauges had an unemployment rate of 5.8%. As of 2008, there were 31 people employed in the primary economic sector and about 13 businesses involved in this sector. 295 people were employed in the secondary sector and there were 37 businesses in this sector. 505 people were employed in the tertiary sector, with 78 businesses in this sector. There were 1,176 residents of the municipality who were employed in some capacity, of which females made up 44.0% of the workforce.

In 2008 the total number of full-time equivalent jobs was 691. The number of jobs in the primary sector was 26, of which 21 were in agriculture, 2 were in forestry or lumber production and 3 were in fishing or fisheries. The number of jobs in the secondary sector was 281 of which 152 or (54.1%) were in manufacturing and 127 (45.2%) were in construction. The number of jobs in the tertiary sector was 384. In the tertiary sector; 89 or 23.2% were in wholesale or retail sales or the repair of motor vehicles, 10 or 2.6% were in the movement and storage of goods, 17 or 4.4% were in a hotel or restaurant, 1 was in the information industry, 4 or 1.0% were the insurance or financial industry, 29 or 7.6% were technical professionals or scientists, 13 or 3.4% were in education and 192 or 50.0% were in health care.

In 2000, there were 418 workers who commuted into the municipality and 760 workers who commuted away. The municipality is a net exporter of workers, with about 1.8 workers leaving the municipality for every one entering. About 1.9% of the workforce coming into Saint-Aubin-Sauges are coming from outside Switzerland. Of the working population, 10.1% used public transportation to get to work, and 63.4% used a private car.

== Religion ==
From the 2000 census, 793 or 32.7% were Roman Catholic, while 860 or 35.4% belonged to the Swiss Reformed Church. Of the rest of the population, there were 31 members of an Orthodox church (or about 1.28% of the population), there was 1 individual who belongs to the Christian Catholic Church, and there were 211 individuals (or about 8.70% of the population) who belonged to another Christian church. There were 3 individuals (or about 0.12% of the population) who were Jewish, and 23 (or about 0.95% of the population) who were Islamic. There were 4 individuals who were Buddhist and 6 individuals who belonged to another church. 507 (or about 20.90% of the population) belonged to no church, are agnostic or atheist, and 92 individuals (or about 3.79% of the population) did not answer the question.

== Education ==
In Saint-Aubin-Sauges about 874 or (36.0%) of the population have completed non-mandatory upper secondary education, and 315 or (13.0%) have completed additional higher education (either university or a Fachhochschule). Of the 315 who completed tertiary schooling, 50.5% were Swiss men, 32.4% were Swiss women, 11.1% were non-Swiss men and 6.0% were non-Swiss women.

In the canton of Neuchâtel most municipalities provide two years of non-mandatory kindergarten, followed by five years of mandatory primary education. The next four years of mandatory secondary education is provided at thirteen larger secondary schools, which many students travel out of their home municipality to attend. The kindergarten in Saint-Aubin-Sauges is combined with Vaumarcus. During the 2010-11 school year, there were 3 kindergarten classes with a total of 50 students between the municipalities. In the same year, there were 7 primary classes with a total of 133 students.

As of 2000, there were 26 students in Saint-Aubin-Sauges who came from another municipality, while 192 residents attended schools outside the municipality.
