= Provence, Switzerland =

Provence
- Municipality
- Flag Coat of arms
- Location of Provence
- Location within Switzerland Location within Canton of Vaud
- Coordinates: 46°53.4′N 06°43.6′E
- Country: Switzerland
- Canton: Vaud
- District: Jura-Nord Vaudois

Government
  - Mayor: Syndic

Area
  - Total: 31.84 km^{2} (12.29 sq mi)
- Elevation: 778 m (2,552 ft)

Population (2003)
  - Total: 364
  - Density: 11.4/km^{2} (29.6/sq mi)
- Time zone: UTC+01:00 (CET)
  - Summer (DST): UTC+02:00 (CEST)
- Postal code: 1428
- SFOS number: 5566
- ISO 3166 code: CH-VD
- Surrounded by: Bonvillars, Concise, Couvet (NE), Fontanezier, Fresens (NE), Gorgier (NE), Montalchez (NE), Môtiers (NE), Mutrux, Romairon, Travers (NE)
- Website: https://www.provence.ch Profile (in French), SFSO statistics

Provence is a municipality in the district of Jura-Nord Vaudois in the canton of Vaud in Switzerland.

== History ==
Provence is first mentioned in 1340 as Provency.

== Geography ==
Provence has an area, as of 2009, of 31.84 square kilometers (12.29 sq mi). Of this area, 17.36 km^{2} (6.70 sq mi) or 54.5% is used for agricultural purposes, while 13.74 km^{2} (5.31 sq mi) or 43.2% is forested. Of the rest of the land, 0.7 km^{2} (0.27 sq mi) or 2.2% is settled (buildings or roads) and 0.06 km^{2} (15 acres) or 0.2% is unproductive land.

Of the built up area, housing and buildings made up 0.7% and transportation infrastructure made up 1.5%. Out of the forested land, 36.1% of the total land area is heavily forested and 7.0% is covered with orchards or small clusters of trees. Of the agricultural land, 3.2% is used for growing crops and 12.4% is pastures and 38.6% is used for alpine pastures.

The municipality was part of the Grandson District until it was dissolved on 31 August 2006, and Provence became part of the new district of Jura-Nord Vaudois.

The municipality is located on the border of the Val-de-Travers and stretches from the foot of Mont Aubert to Creux-du-Van. It consists of the village of Provence, the hamlet of Les Prises, the housing development of Montagne Devant and the La Nouvelle Censière area.

== Coat of arms ==
The blazon of the municipal coat of arms is Pally of Six Argent and Azure, a Buck Gules crowned with a Latin cross emanating Or.

== Demographics ==
Provence has a population (as of December 2020) of 392. As of 2008, 4.9% of the population are resident foreign nationals. Over the last 10 years (1999–2009) the population has changed at a rate of 5.6%. It has changed at a rate of 8.3% due to migration and at a rate of -2.7% due to births and deaths.

Most of the population (as of 2000) speaks French (354 or 96.2%), with German being second most common (11 or 3.0%) and Italian being third (1 or 0.3%).

Of the population in the municipality 154 or about 41.8% were born in Provence and lived there in 2000. There were 57 or 15.5% who were born in the same canton, while 96 or 26.1% were born somewhere else in Switzerland, and 25 or 6.8% were born outside of Switzerland.

In 2008 there were 3 live births to Swiss citizens and were 2 deaths of Swiss citizens. Ignoring immigration and emigration, the population of Swiss citizens increased by 1 while the foreign population remained the same. There was 1 Swiss man and 1 Swiss woman who emigrated from Switzerland. At the same time, there was 2 non-Swiss women who immigrated from another country to Switzerland. The total Swiss population change in 2008 (from all sources, including moves across municipal borders) was a decrease of 2 and the non-Swiss population increased by 1 people. This represents a population growth rate of -0.3%.

The age distribution, as of 2009, in Provence is; 29 children or 8.1% of the population are between 0 and 9 years old and 54 teenagers or 15.1% are between 10 and 19. Of the adult population, 34 people or 9.5% of the population are between 20 and 29 years old. 46 people or 12.8% are between 30 and 39, 60 people or 16.8% are between 40 and 49, and 41 people or 11.5% are between 50 and 59. The senior population distribution is 45 people or 12.6% of the population are between 60 and 69 years old, 30 people or 8.4% are between 70 and 79, there are 18 people or 5.0% who are between 80 and 89, and there is 1 person who is 90 and older.

As of 2000, there were 165 people who were single and never married in the municipality. There were 154 married individuals, 27 widows or widowers and 22 individuals who are divorced.

As of 2000, there were 144 private households in the municipality, and an average of 2.3 persons per household. There were 48 households that consist of only one person and 13 households with five or more people. Out of a total of 148 households that answered this question, 32.4% were households made up of just one person and there was 1 adult who lived with their parents. Of the rest of the households, there are 40 married couples without children, 43 married couples with children There were 7 single parents with a child or children. There were 5 households that were made up of unrelated people and 4 households that were made up of some sort of institution or another collective housing.

In 2000 there were 51 single family homes (or 40.2% of the total) out of a total of 127 inhabited buildings. There were 21 multi-family buildings (16.5%), along with 44 multi-purpose buildings that were mostly used for housing (34.6%) and 11 other use buildings (commercial or industrial) that also had some housing (8.7%). Of the single family homes 35 were built before 1919, while 5 were built between 1990 and 2000. The most multi-family homes (16) were built before 1919 and the next most (2) were built between 1961 and 1970.

In 2000 there were 165 apartments in the municipality. The most common apartment size was 3 rooms of which there were 46. There were 6 single room apartments and 44 apartments with five or more rooms. Of these apartments, a total of 127 apartments (77.0% of the total) were permanently occupied, while 29 apartments (17.6%) were seasonally occupied and 9 apartments (5.5%) were empty. As of 2009, the construction rate of new housing units was 0 new units per 1000 residents. The vacancy rate for the municipality, in 2010, was 0.58%.

The historical population is given in the following chart:

== Heritage sites of national significance ==
The Chalet D’Alpage La Redalle is listed as a Swiss heritage site of national significance. The entire village of Provence is part of the Inventory of Swiss Heritage Sites.

== Politics ==
In the 2007 federal election the most popular party was the SP which received 30.89% of the vote. The next three most popular parties were the SVP (29.84%), the Green Party (17.43%) and the FDP (7.07%). In the federal election, a total of 100 votes were cast, and the voter turnout was 40.0%.

== Economy ==
As of 2010, Provence had an unemployment rate of 1.5%. As of 2008, there were 62 people employed in the primary economic sector and about 22 businesses involved in this sector. 11 people were employed in the secondary sector and there were 4 businesses in this sector. 47 people were employed in the tertiary sector, with 9 businesses in this sector. There were 163 residents of the municipality who were employed in some capacity, of which females made up 41.7% of the workforce.

In 2008 the total number of full-time equivalent jobs was 94. The number of jobs in the primary sector was 49, of which 46 were in agriculture and 3 were in forestry or lumber production. The number of jobs in the secondary sector was 8, all of which were in manufacturing. The number of jobs in the tertiary sector was 37. In the tertiary sector; 5 or 13.5% were in wholesale or retail sales or the repair of motor vehicles, 8 or 21.6% were in a hotel or restaurant, 1 was in the information industry, 3 or 8.1% were in education and 21 or 56.8% were in health care.

In 2000, there were 31 workers who commuted into the municipality and 80 workers who commuted away. The municipality is a net exporter of workers, with about 2.6 workers leaving the municipality for every one entering. Of the working population, 7.4% used public transportation to get to work, and 50.9% used a private car.

== Religion ==
From the 2000 census, 32 or 8.7% were Roman Catholic, while 243 or 66.0% belonged to the Swiss Reformed Church. Of the rest of the population, there was 1 member of an Orthodox church, and there were 12 individuals (or about 3.26% of the population) who belonged to another Christian church. 56 (or about 15.22% of the population) belonged to no church, are agnostic or atheist, and 30 individuals (or about 8.15% of the population) did not answer the question.

== Education ==
In Provence about 97 or (26.4%) of the population have completed non-mandatory upper secondary education, and 30 or (8.2%) have completed additional higher education (either university or a Fachhochschule). Of the 30 who completed tertiary schooling, 53.3% were Swiss men, 36.7% were Swiss women.

In the 2009/2010 school year there were a total of 44 students in the Provence school district. In the Vaud cantonal school system, two years of non-obligatory pre-school are provided by the political districts. During the school year, the political district provided pre-school care for a total of 578 children of which 359 children (62.1%) received subsidized pre-school care. The canton's primary school program requires students to attend for four years. There were 19 students in the municipal primary school program. The obligatory lower secondary school program lasts for six years and there were 22 students in those schools. There were also 3 students who were home schooled or attended another non-traditional school.

As of 2000, there were 11 students in Provence who came from another municipality, while 32 residents attended schools outside the municipality.
