= Auvernier Castle Cellars =

Swiss winery

- Native name: Caves du Chateau Auvernier
- Industry: Winery
- Founded: 1603
- Headquarters: Chateau, Auvernier, Switzerland
- Website: www.chateau-auvernier.ch/en

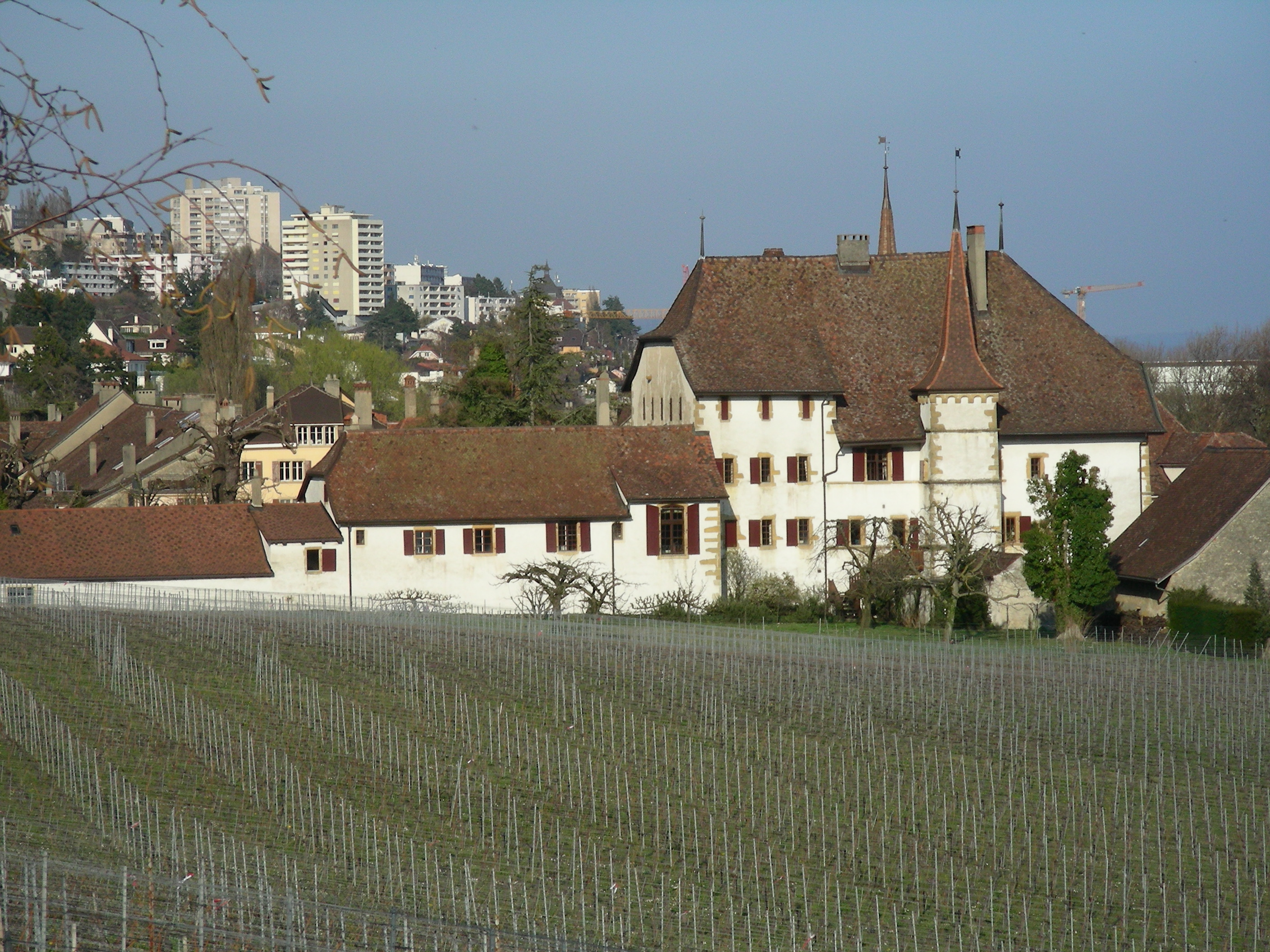
Auvernier Castle vineyards

Auvernier Castle Cellars or Caves du Chateau Auvernier is a Swiss winery that cultivates about 40 hectares of grapevines and produce over 10 wine types. Located in Auvernier Castle, The winery is one of the oldest in Switzerland and is a family business from its foundation in 1603. The local Chardonnay grape is used for production of the white wine. The main source for the red wine production is the pinot noir grape type.

== See also ==
- Swiss wine
- List of oldest companies
