= Milvignes =

- Municipality
- Coat of arms
- Location of Milvignes
- Location within Switzerland Location within Canton of Neuchâtel
- Coordinates: 46°58′N 6°52′E
- Country: Switzerland
- Canton: Neuchâtel

Area
  - Total: 8.79 km^{2} (3.39 sq mi)
- Elevation: 457 m (1,499 ft)

Population (2018-12-31)
  - Total: 8,887
  - Density: 1,010/km^{2} (2,620/sq mi)
- Time zone: UTC+01:00 (CET)
  - Summer (DST): UTC+02:00 (CEST)
- Postal code: 2012 - 2014
- SFOS number: 6416
- ISO 3166 code: CH-NE
- Localities: Auvernier, Bôle and Colombier
- Surrounded by: Rochefort, Corcelles-Cormondrèche, Peseux, Neuchâtel, Boudry
- Website: http://www.milvignes.ch SFSO statistics

Milvignes (French pronunciation: [milviɲ]) is a municipality in the canton of Neuchâtel in Switzerland. It was formed on January 1, 2013, by merging the former municipalities Auvernier, Bôle and Colombier.

== History ==
=== Auvernier ===
Auvernier is first mentioned in 1011 as Averniacum. The municipality was formerly known by its German name Avernach, however, that name is no longer used.

=== Bôle ===
Bôle is first mentioned in 1346 as Boule.

=== Colombier ===
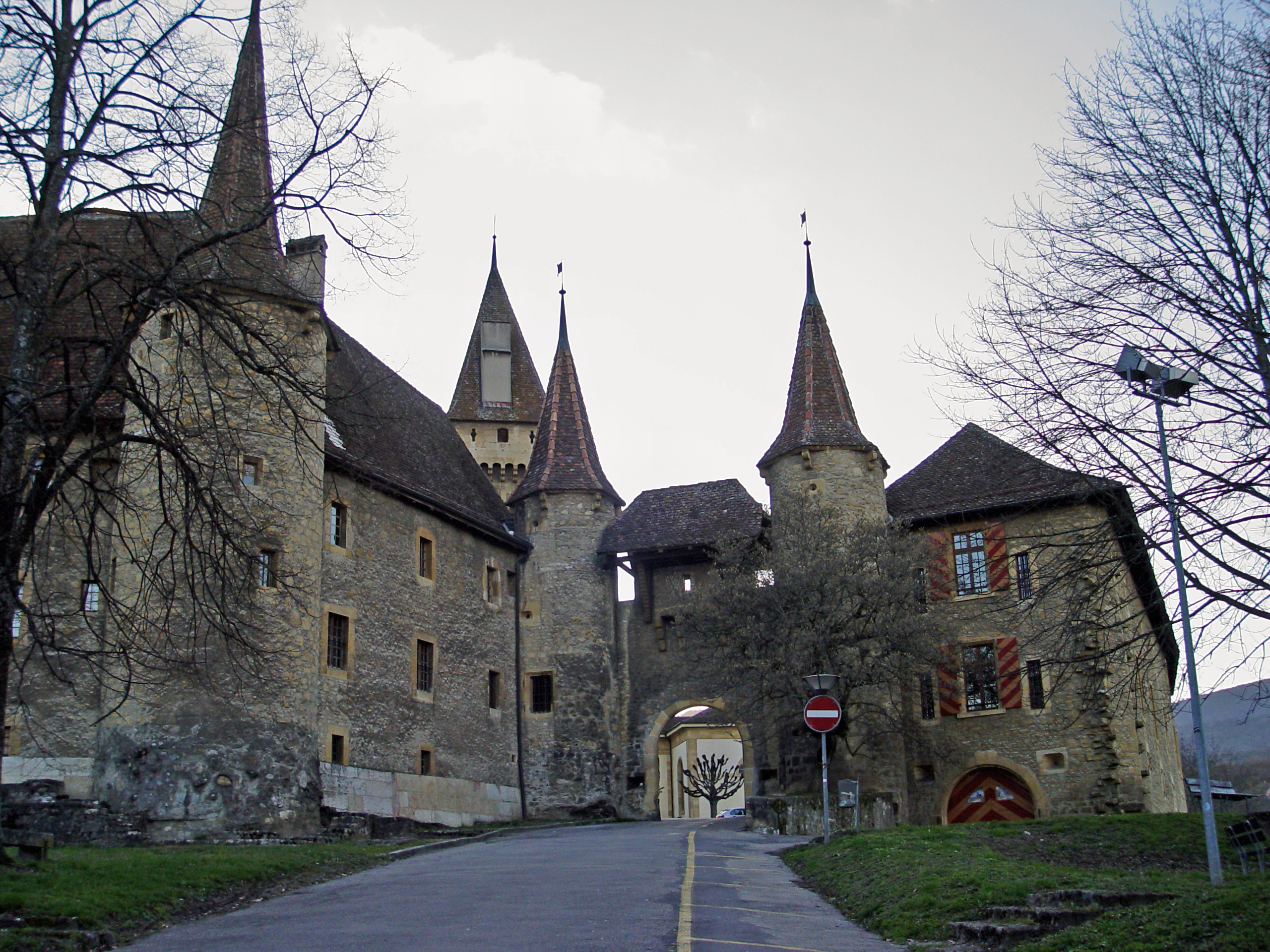
Colombier castle

Colombier is first mentioned in 1228 as Columbier.

Four lakeside settlements from the Neolithic and the Bronze Age have been discovered in Colombier. One of the largest Roman era villas in Switzerland was excavated from under the castle in 1840–1842 by Frédéric Dubois de Montperreux. It was built in multiple stages between the 1st and 3rd centuries AD into a palatial mansion with a peristyle, at least two baths with mosaics and frescoes and terraced gardens. A Merovingian graveyard was found near Colombier.

In the 11th or 12th century a fortified tower was built over the ruins of the Roman villa. It expanded in the 13th century and by the 16th century had reached its present appearance.

During the Middle Ages, the Seigneurie of Colombier included the villages of Colombier and Areuse, a part of Bôle and a third of the Vogtei of Bevaix. They also had rights in Fretereules and Val-de-Ruz. The noble Colombier family were vassals of the count of Neuchâtel. During the Middle Ages, they also acquired, by marriage, the fiefs of Savagnier, Cormondrèche and the fief of the Pressoir of Colombeir in Thielle. In 1488 the Colombier lands were acquired by marriage by the de Chauvirey family of Franche-Comté. In 1513, they were acquired by Johann Jakob von Watteville of Bern. Under von Watteville, the territory expanded further into Bevaix. In 1564, the land was purchased by the Counts of Neuchâtel, for 60,000 crowns. Under Johann Jakob von Watteville, the Protestant Reformation was successfully introduced in town. When portions of the Armée de l'Est were interred in Colombier in 1871, the Catholic Mass began to be read once again in the church.

The boundaries of the village are first documented in 1346. In 1357 it received, along with Bôle and Areuse, a forest which the three municipalities jointly managed until the 18th century. During the 16th and 17th centuries, much of the population was exempted from many of the feudal taxes and fees that they had paid to their feudal overlords. The last feudal tax, however, was finally abolished in the 19th century. In the middle of the 17th century, the town was saved from bankruptcy through a loan given by the bankers Abraham Mouchet and his son. Henri II d'Orléans, the Prince of Neuchatel, freed the municipality from its debts in 1657. In exchange, the municipality pledged to plant trees along the road from the lake to the castle.

A chapel is first mentioned in Colombier in 1177. It became a parish before 1228, which included Montézillon in the Middle Ages, Areuse until 1832 and Auvernier until 1879. The right to appoint the priest at St. Stefan's church in Colombier was held by the cathedral chapter of Lausanne Cathedral. A Catholic parish was founded in 1884.

In 1734, the first spinning factory in the Lower Areuse was built in Colombier by Jean-Jacques Deluz Bied. By 1739 it had about 80 workers. The factory brought a degree of prosperity and enabled the construction stately country houses in the vicinity of the village (Le Bied, Vaudijon, La Mairesse, Cottendart, Sombacour).

In 1806, Colombier Castle was converted into a military hospital. Starting in 1824, it was used by the Federal militias as a parade ground and was converted into a barracks and given an expanded arsenal. In 1877 it became the official barracks of the 2. Division, which later became Field Division 2. In 2003, the Army XXI reforms dissolved the division and in 2004 the barracks became an infantry training center.

In the 19th century, Colombier was a regional center, with a gas plant and a bank. The first train station was built in 1859–60. In 1892 it became part of the tram line Neuchâtel-Boudry and in 1927 an airfield was built in the municipality. The regional secondary school was built in the 1969 and teaches students from Colombier, Cortaillod, Boudry, Bôle, Rochefort and Auvernier. It is now a residential community, with few industries. Many of the jobs in town support the barracks.

== Geography ==
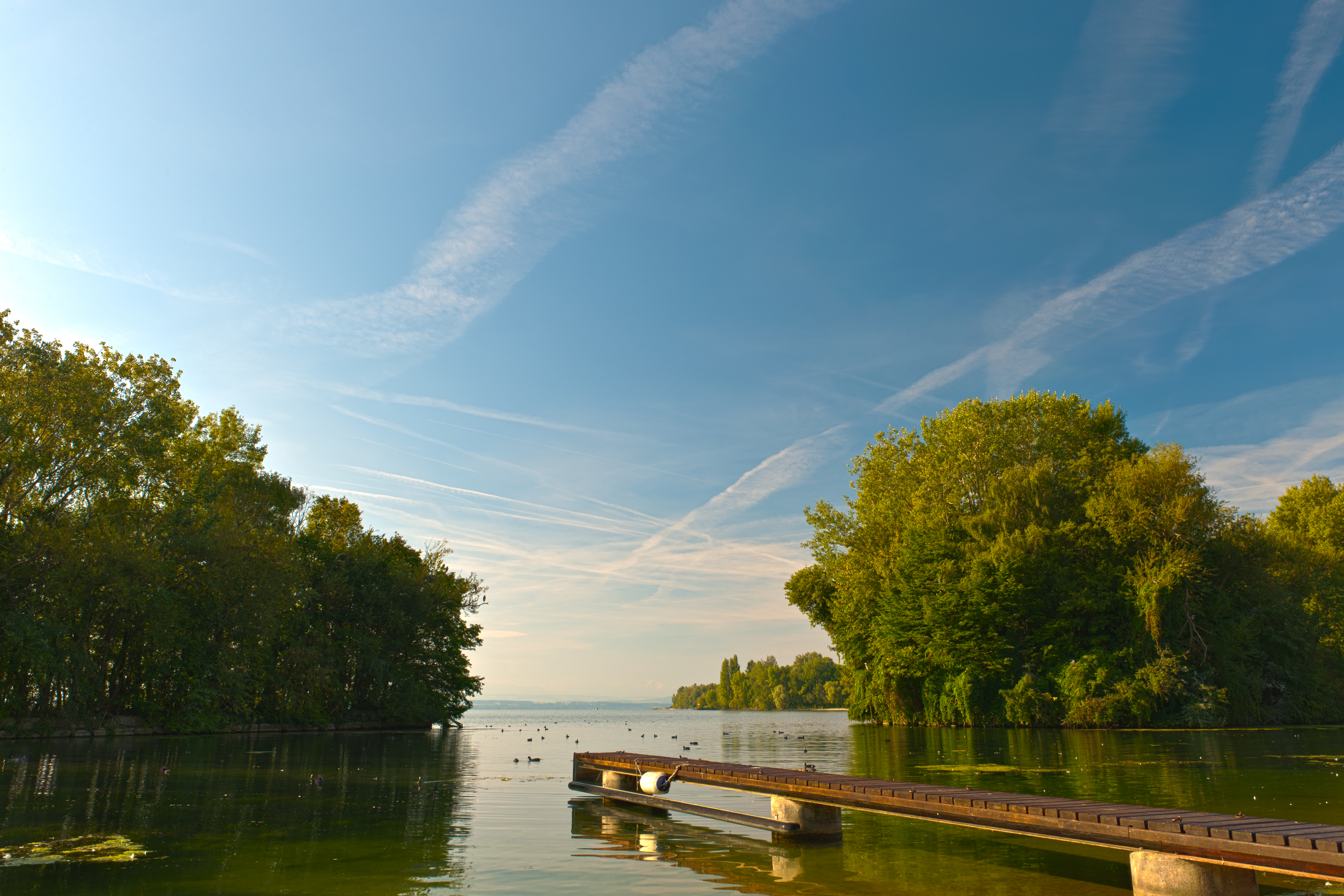
Near the prehistoric settlement at Baie d'Auvernier on Lake Neuchâtel in Colombier

The former municipalities that make up Milvignes had an area of 8.78 km^{2} (3.39 sq mi).

Auvernier had an area, as of 2009, of 1.7 square kilometers (0.66 mi^{2}). Of this area, 0.79 km^{2} (0.31 mi^{2}) or 47.0% is used for agricultural purposes, while 0.06 km^{2} (0.023 mi^{2}) or 3.6% is forested. Of the rest of the land, 0.8 km^{2} (0.31 mi^{2}) or 47.6% is settled (buildings or roads), 0.04 km^{2} (9.9 acres) or 2.4% is either rivers or lakes and 0.01 km^{2} (2.5 acres) or 0.6% is unproductive land. The former municipality is located on the north-west bank of Lake Neuchâtel.

Bôle had an area, as of 2009, of 2.6 square kilometers (1.0 mi^{2}). Of this area, 0.7 km^{2} (0.27 mi^{2}) or 27.1% is used for agricultural purposes, while 1.16 km^{2} (0.45 mi^{2}) or 45.0% is forested. Of the rest of the land, 0.73 km^{2} (0.28 mi^{2}) or 28.3% is settled (buildings or roads). The former municipality is located on the slope above the old Roman era road Vy d'Etraz. It consists of the linear village of Bôle.

Colombier had an area, as of 2009, of 4.5 square kilometers (1.7 mi^{2}). Of this area, 1.78 km^{2} (0.69 mi^{2}) or 39.4% is used for agricultural purposes, while 0.85 km^{2} (0.33 mi^{2}) or 18.8% is forested. Of the rest of the land, 1.86 km^{2} (0.72 mi^{2}) or 41.2% is settled (buildings or roads), 0.01 km^{2} (2.5 acres) or 0.2% is either rivers or lakes and 0.02 km^{2} (4.9 acres) or 0.4% is unproductive land. The former municipality is located on a small hill above Lake Neuchâtel.

The municipality was located in the district of Boudry, until the district level was eliminated on 1 January 2018.

== Demographics ==
The total population of Milvignes (as of December 2020) is 9,063.

== Historic population ==
The historical population is given in the following chart:

== Transportation ==
The municipality has three railway stations: Auvernier, Colombier NE, and Bôle. The first two are located on the Jura Foot line while the latter is on the Neuchâtel–Pontarlier line. Between them they have regular service to Yverdon-les-Bains, Neuchâtel, and Buttes. Also serving the municipality is the Boudry–Neuchâtel Littorail tram line.

== Heritage sites of national significance ==
In Auvernier the prehistoric lake shore settlement at Baie D‘Auvernier and Auvernier Castle are listed as Swiss heritage site of national significance. In Colombier the Arsenal, the prehistoric lake shore settlement at Baie d'Auvernier, Colombier Castle with its museum, Roman villa and fortifications, the Domaine de Vaudijon, the House de maître du Bied and the Manoir Le Pontet are listed as Swiss heritage sites of national significance. The entire urban village of Colombier, the village of Auvernier and the Areuse region are part of the Inventory of Swiss Heritage Sites.

=== World heritage site ===
It is home to the La Saunerie and Les Graviers prehistoric pile-dwelling (or stilt house) settlements which are part of the Prehistoric pile dwellings around the Alps UNESCO World Heritage Site.

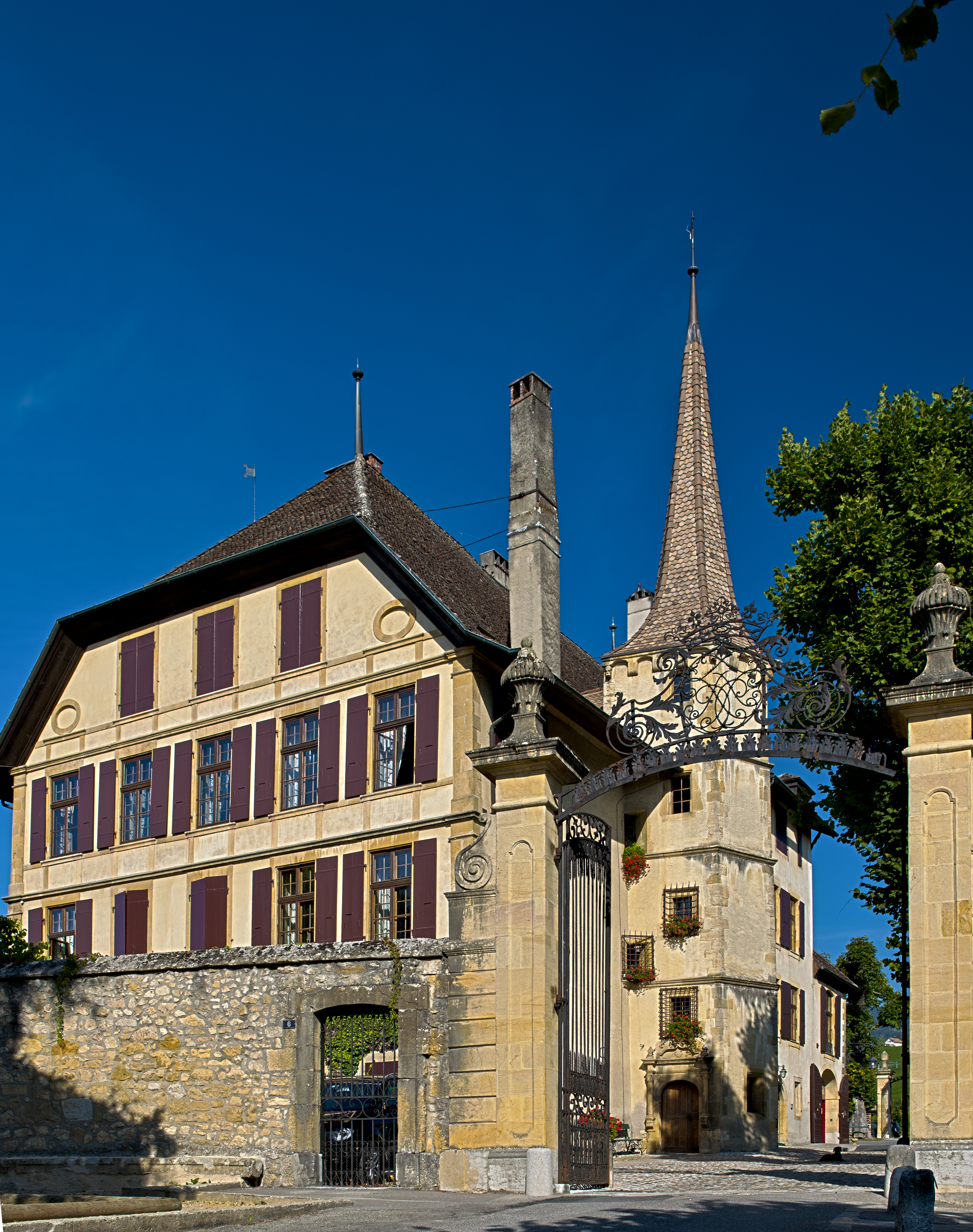
Auvernier Castle

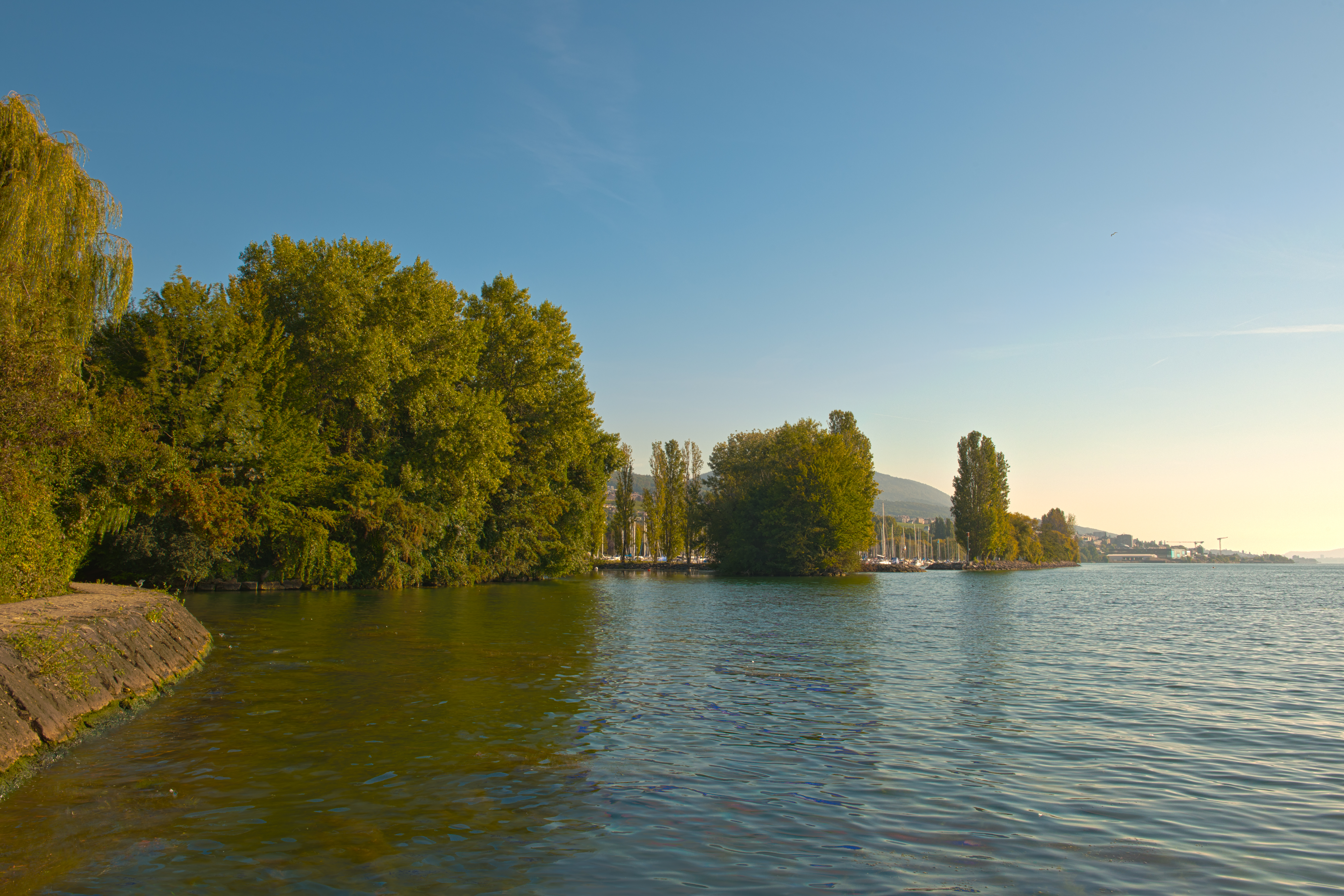
Site of the Baie d'Auvernier prehistoric settlement

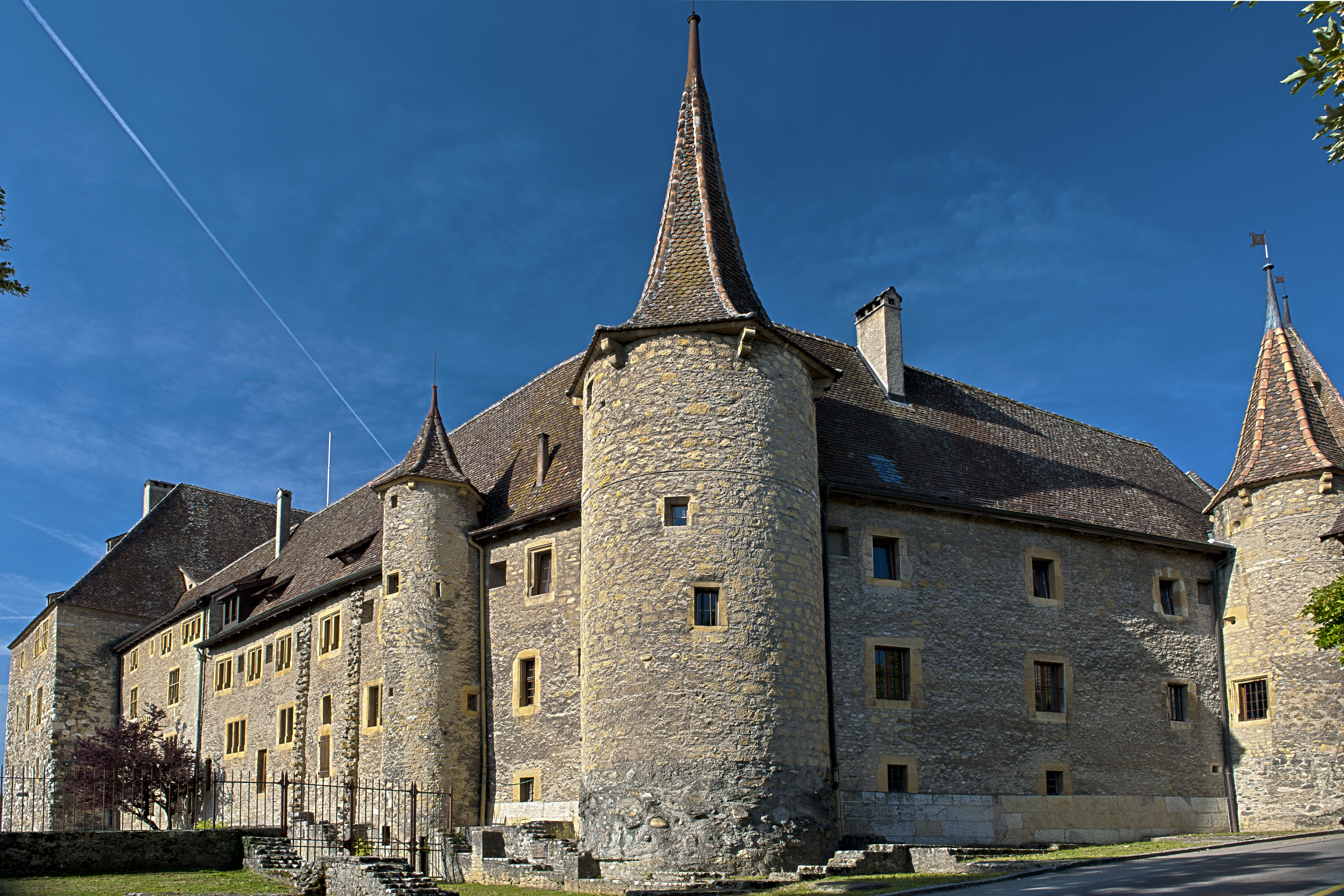
Colombier Castle

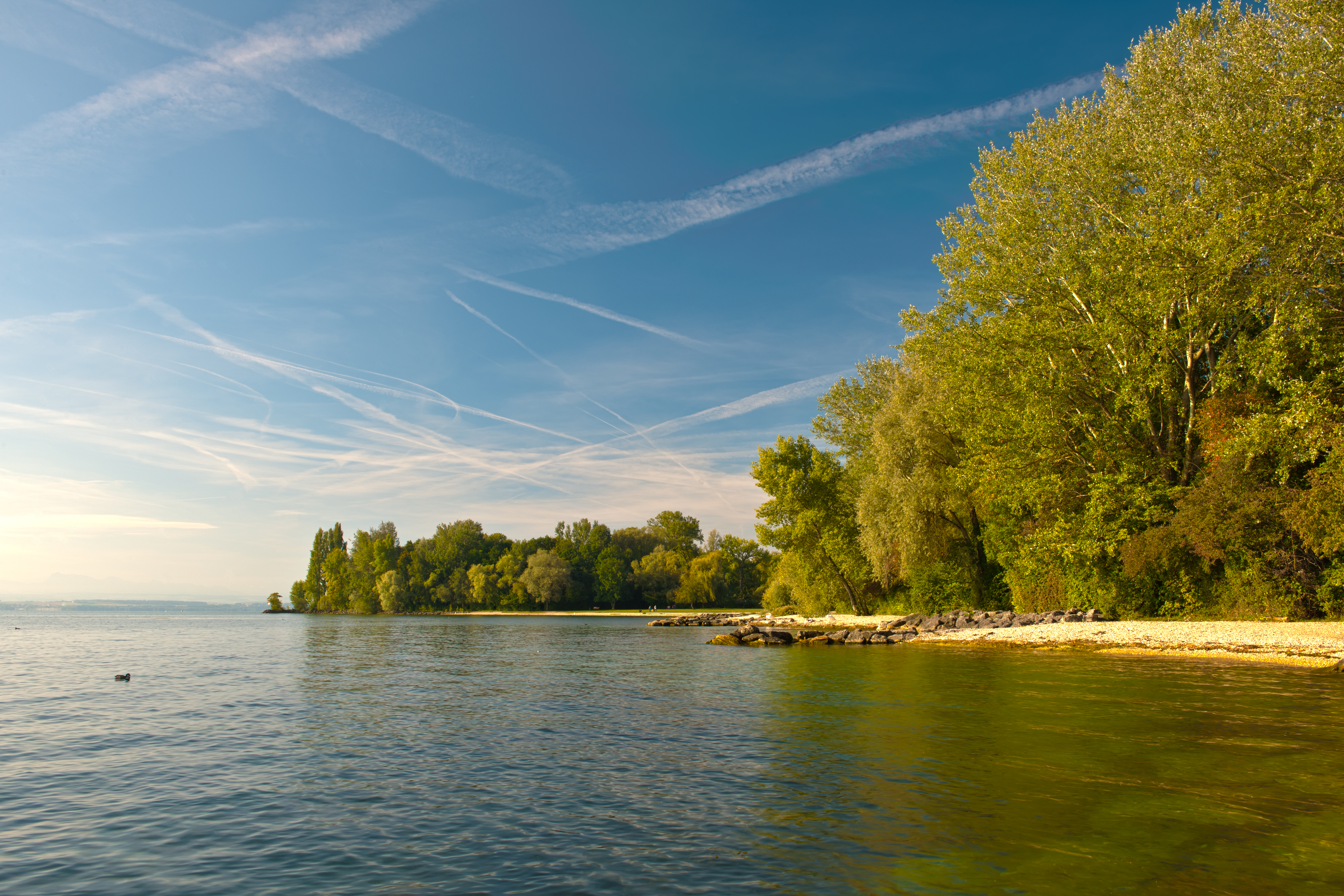
The prehistoric lake shore settlement at Baie d‘Auvernier

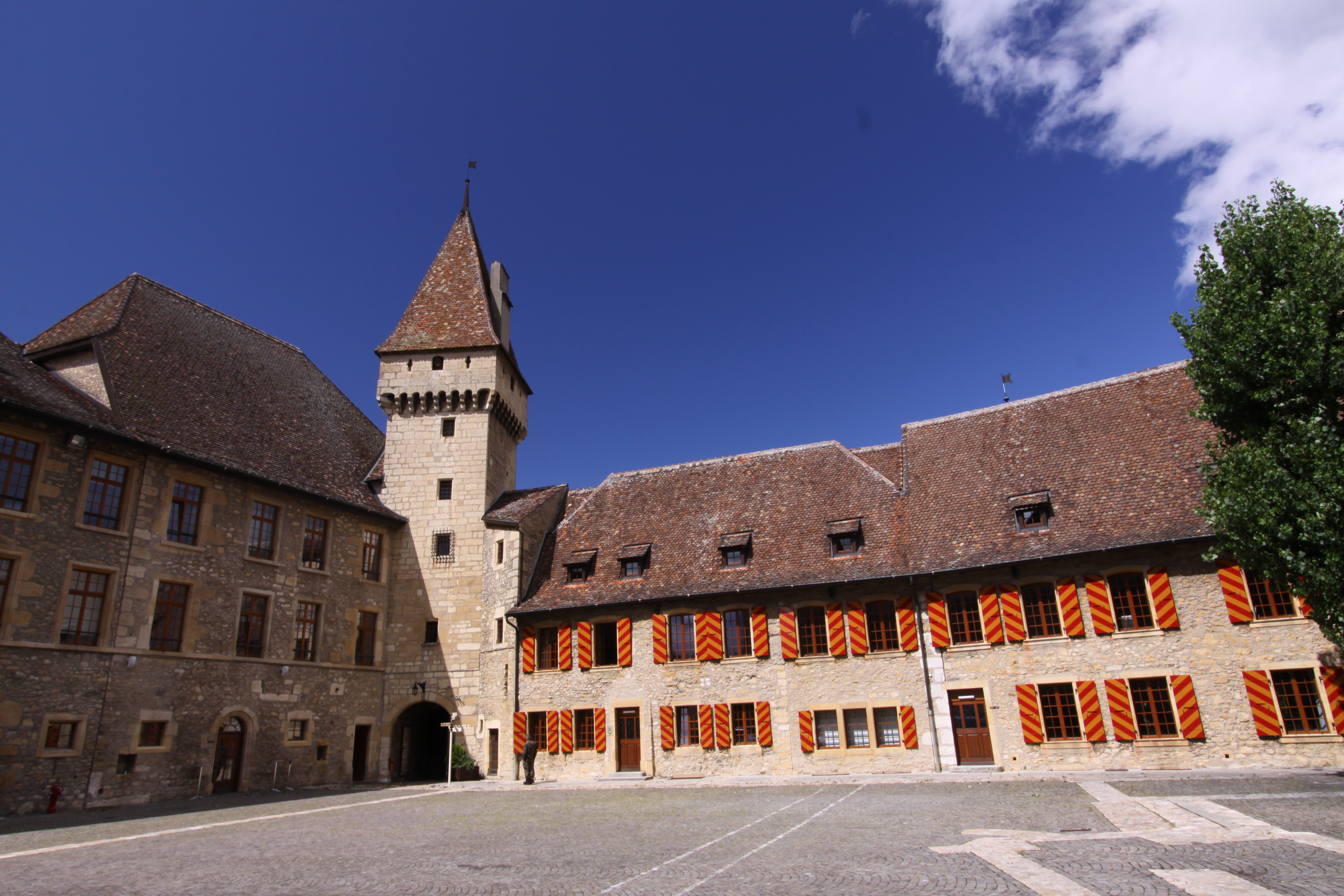
Colombier Castle

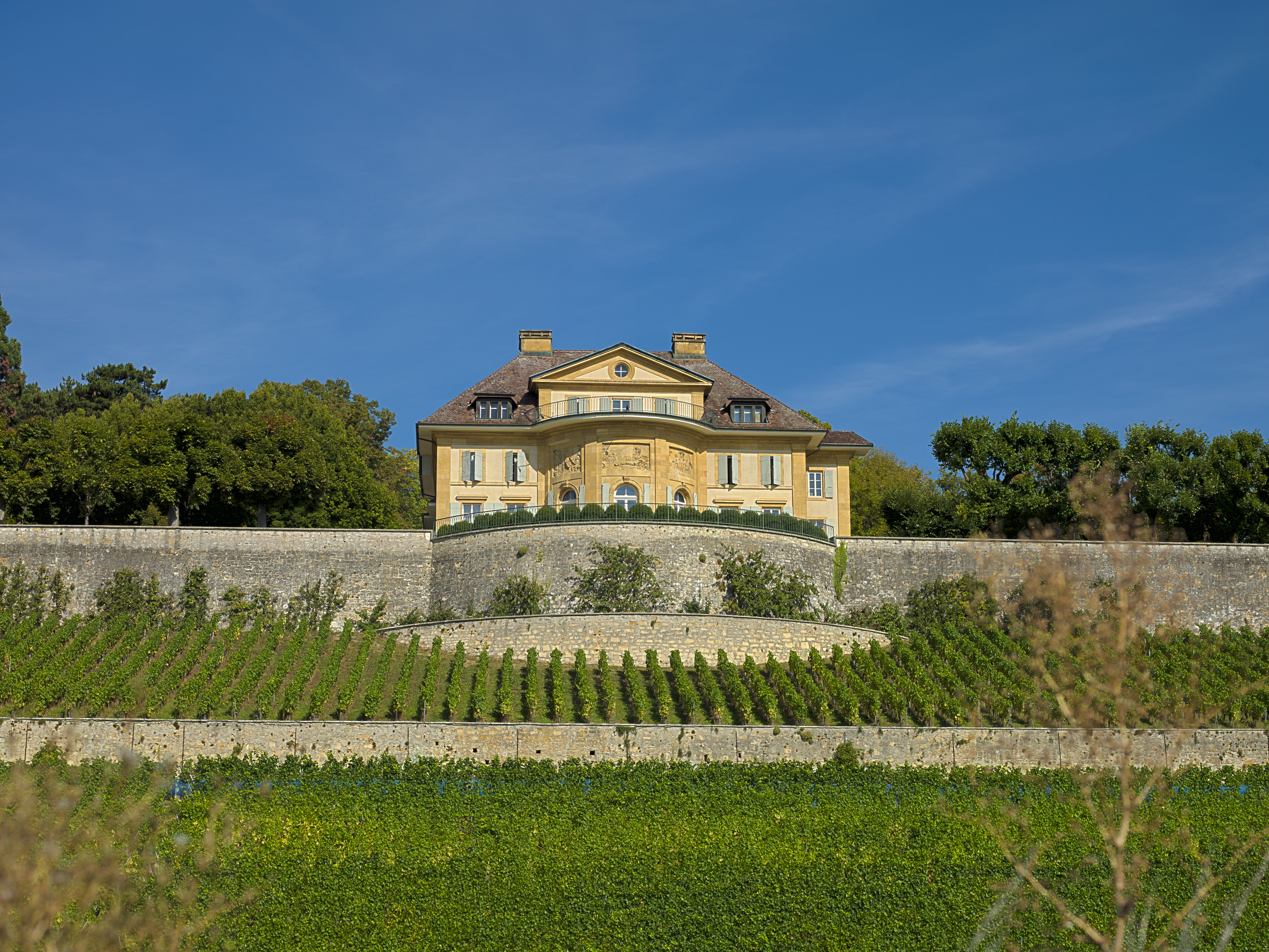
Domaine de Vaudijon

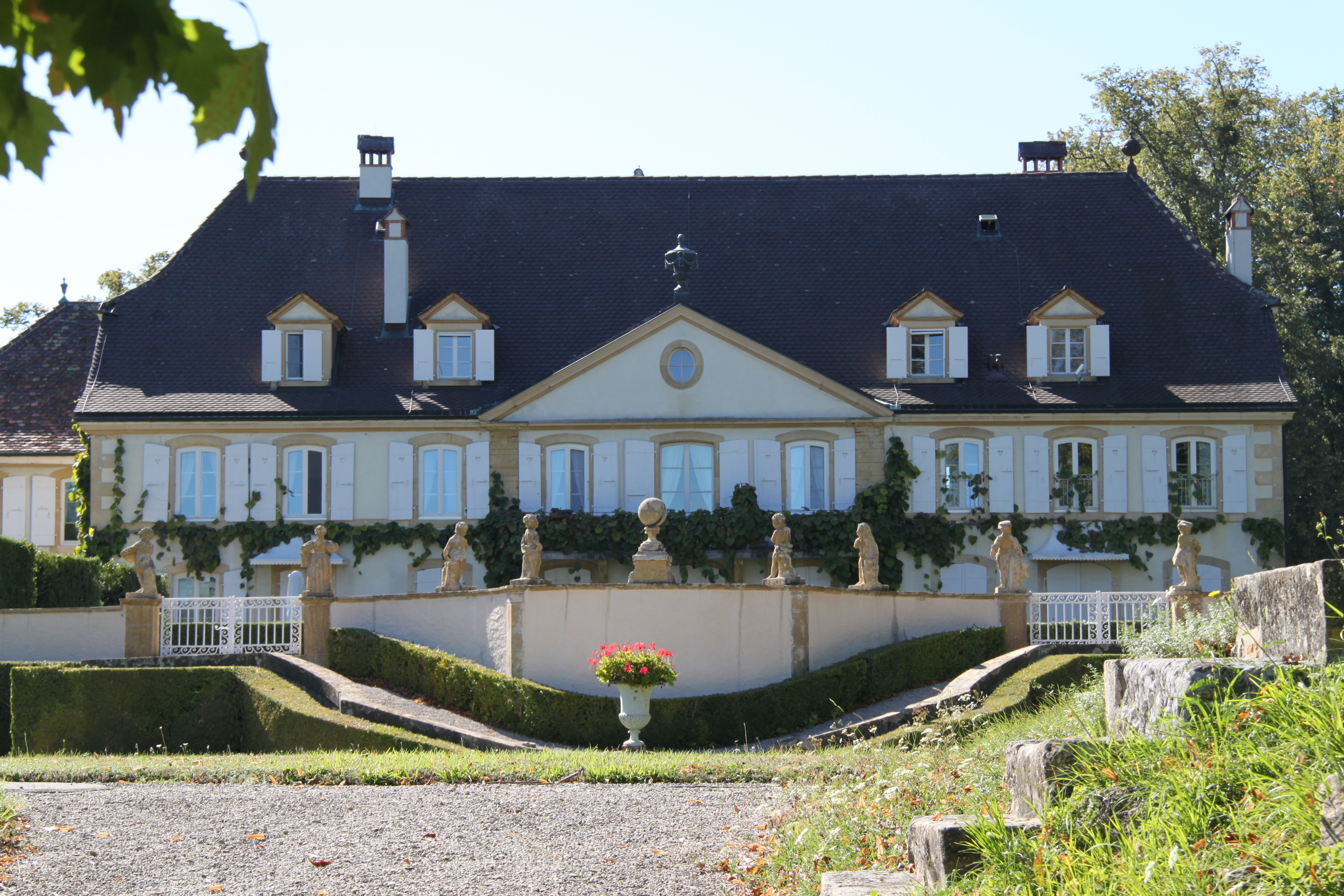
House de maître du Bied

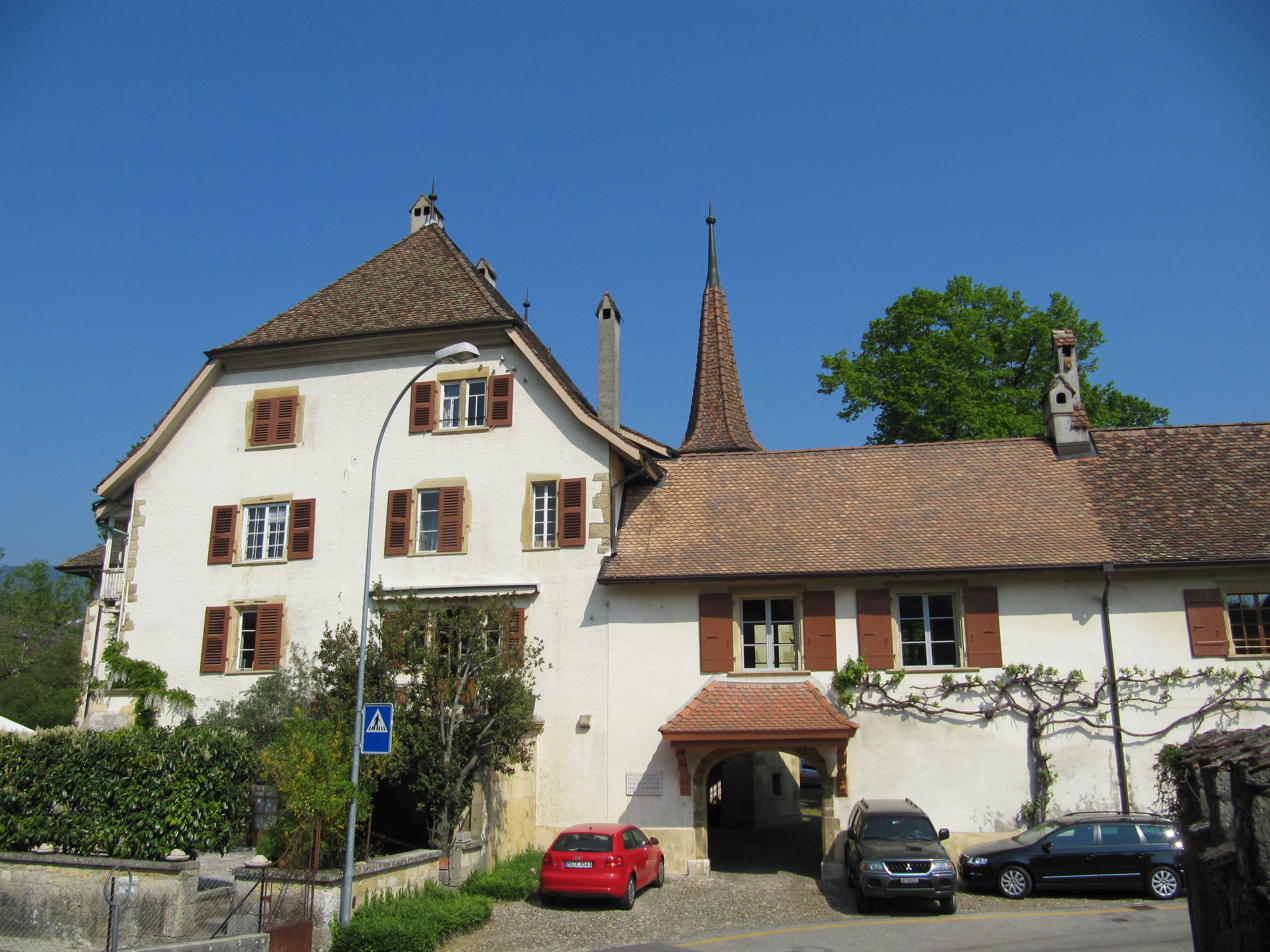
Manoir Le Pontet
