= Colombier, Neuchâtel =

Colombier
- Former municipality
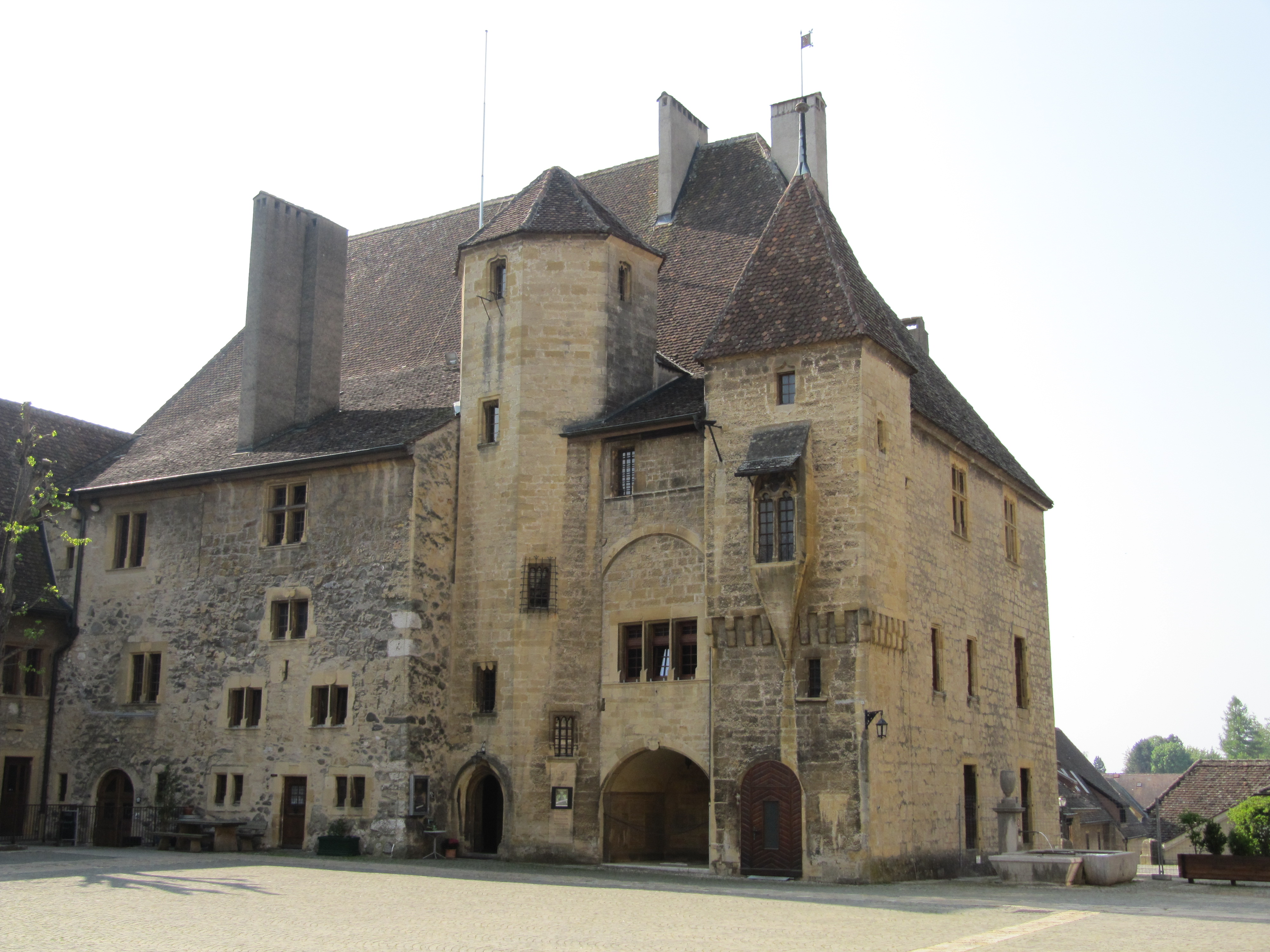
- Colombier Castle

- Coat of arms
- Location of Colombier
- Location within Switzerland Location within Canton of Neuchâtel
- Coordinates: 46°58′N 6°52′E
- Country: Switzerland
- Canton: Neuchâtel
- District: Boudry
- Municipality: Milvignes

Area
  - Total: 4.52 km^{2} (1.75 sq mi)
- Elevation: 457 m (1,499 ft)

Population (December 2011)
  - Total: 5,510
  - Density: 1,220/km^{2} (3,160/sq mi)
- Time zone: UTC+01:00 (CET)
  - Summer (DST): UTC+02:00 (CEST)
- Postal code: 2013
- SFOS number: 6406
- ISO 3166 code: CH-NE
- Surrounded by: Auvernier, Bôle, Boudry, Corcelles-Cormondrèche, Neuchâtel, Rochefort
- Website: www.colombier.ne.ch

Colombier (French pronunciation: [kɔlɔ̃bje]) is a former municipality in the Boudry District in the canton of Neuchâtel in Switzerland. The municipalities of Auvernier, Bôle and Colombier merged on 1 January 2013 into the new municipality of Milvignes.

== History ==
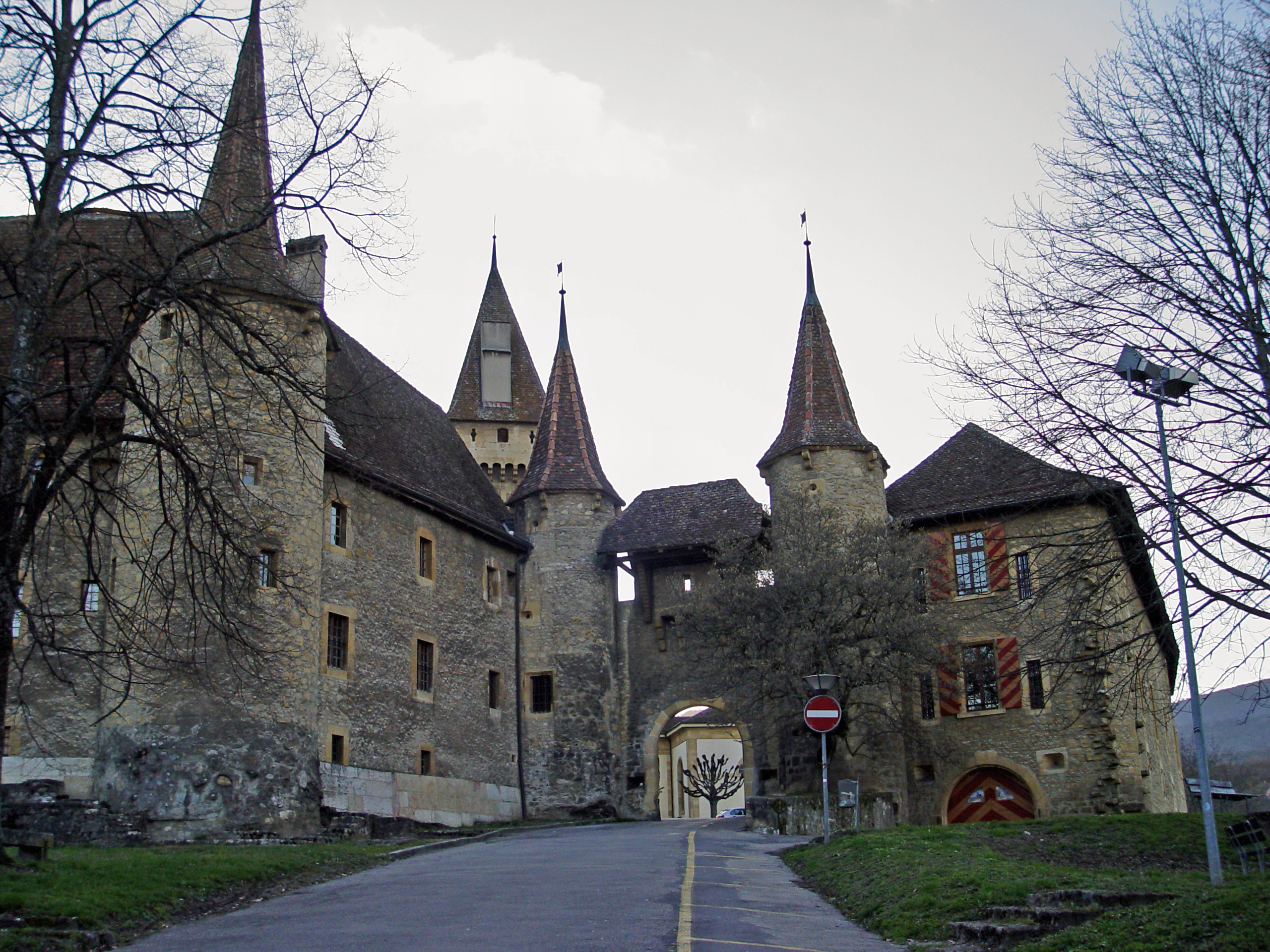
Colombier castle

Aerial view (1954)

Colombier is first mentioned in 1228 as Columbier.

Four lakeside settlements from the Neolithic and the Bronze Age have been discovered in Colombier. One of the largest Roman era villas in Switzerland was excavated from under the castle in 1840–1842 by Frédéric Dubois de Montperreux. It was built in multiple stages between the 1st and 3rd centuries AD into a palatial mansion with a peristyle, at least two baths with mosaics and frescoes and terraced gardens. A Merovingian graveyard was found near Colombier.

In the 11th or 12th century a fortified tower was built over the ruins of the Roman villa. It expanded in the 13th century and by the 16th century had reached its present appearance.

During the Middle Ages, the Seigneurie of Colombier included the villages of Colombier and Areuse, a part of Bôle and a third of the Vogtei of Bevaix. They also had rights in Fretereules and Val-de-Ruz. The noble Colombier family were vassals of the count of Neuchâtel. During the Middle Ages, they also acquired, by marriage, the fiefs of Savagnier, Cormondrèche and the fief of the Pressoir of Colombeir in Thielle. In 1488 the Colombier lands were acquired by marriage by the de Chauvirey family of Franche-Comté. In 1513, they were acquired by Johann Jakob von Watteville of Bern. Under von Watteville, the territory expanded further into Bevaix. In 1564, the land was purchased by the Counts of Neuchâtel, for 60,000 crowns. Under Johann Jakob von Watteville, the Protestant Reformation was successfully introduced in town. When portions of the Armée de l'Est were interred in Colombier in 1871, the Catholic mass began to be read once again in the church.

The boundaries of the village are first documented in 1346. In 1357 it received, along with Bôle and Areuse, a forest which the three municipalities jointly managed until the 18th century. During the 16th and 17th centuries, much of the population was exempted from many of the feudal taxes and fees that they had paid to their feudal overlords. The last feudal tax, however, was finally abolished in the 19th century. In the middle of the 17th century, the town was saved from bankruptcy through a loan given by the bankers Abraham Mouchet and his son. Henri II d'Orléans, the Prince of Neuchatel, freed the municipality from its debts in 1657. In exchange, the municipality pledged to plant trees along the road from the lake to the castle.

A chapel is first mentioned in Colombier in 1177. It became a parish before 1228, which included Montézillon in the Middle Ages, Areuse until 1832 and Auvernier until 1879. The right to appoint the priest at St. Stefan's church in Colombier was held by the cathedral chapter of Lausanne Cathedral. A Catholic parish was founded in 1884.

In 1734, the first spinning factory in the Lower Areuse was built in Colombier by Jean-Jacques Deluz Bied. By 1739 it had about 80 workers. The factory brought a degree of prosperity and enabled the construction stately country houses in the vicinity of the village (Le Bied, Vaudijon, La Mairesse, Cottendart, Sombacour).

In 1806, Colombier Castle was converted into a military hospital. Starting in 1824, it was used by the Federal militias as a parade ground and was converted into a barracks and given an expanded arsenal. In 1877 it became the official barracks of the 2. Division, which later became Field Division 2. In 2003, the Army XXI reforms dissolved the Division and in 2004 the barracks became an infantry training center.

In the 19th century, Colombier was a regional center, with a gas plant and a bank. The first train station was built in 1859–60. In 1892 it became part of the tram line Neuchâtel-Boudry and in 1927 an airfield was built in the municipality. The regional secondary school was built in the 1969 and teaches students from Colombier, Cortaillod, Boudry, Bôle, Rochefort and Auvernier. It is now a residential community, with few industries. Many of the jobs in town support the barracks.

== Geography ==
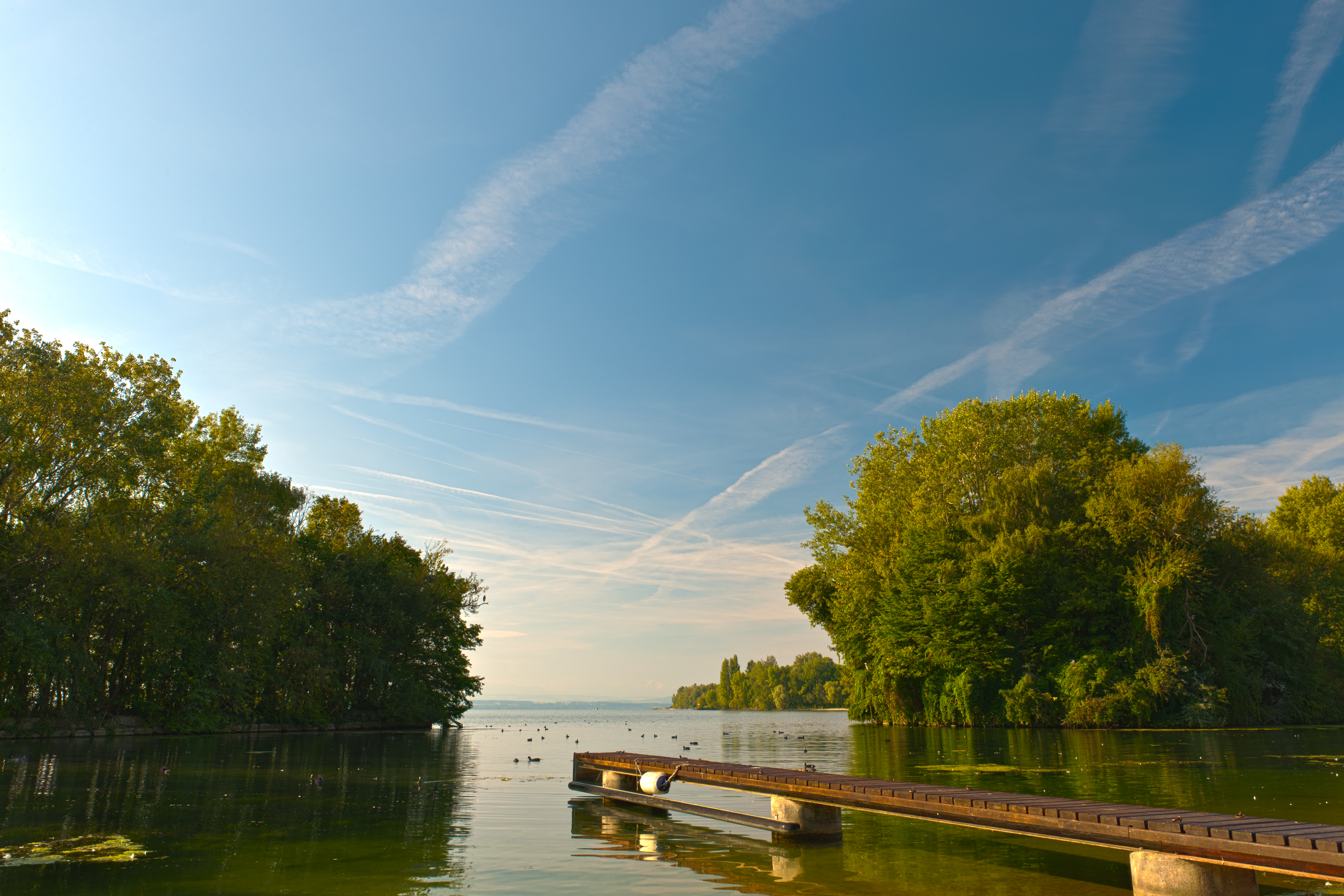
Near the prehistoric settlement at Baie d'Auvernier on Lake Neuchatel in Colombier

Colombier had an area, as of 2009, of 4.5 square kilometers (1.7 mi^{2}). Of this area, 1.78 km^{2} (0.69 mi^{2}) or 39.4% is used for agricultural purposes, while 0.85 km^{2} (0.33 mi^{2}) or 18.8% is forested. Of the rest of the land, 1.86 km^{2} (0.72 mi^{2}) or 41.2% is settled (buildings or roads), 0.01 km^{2} (2.5 acres) or 0.2% is either rivers or lakes and 0.02 km^{2} (4.9 acres) or 0.4% is unproductive land.

Of the built up area, industrial buildings made up 2.7% of the total area while housing and buildings made up 21.0% and transportation infrastructure made up 11.9%. Power and water infrastructure as well as other special developed areas made up 2.0% of the area while parks, green belts and sports fields made up 3.5%. Out of the forested land, 17.5% of the total land area is heavily forested and 1.3% is covered with orchards or small clusters of trees. Of the agricultural land, 9.3% is used for growing crops and 13.3% is pastures, while 16.8% is used for orchards or vine crops. All the water in the municipality is in lakes.

The former municipality is located in the Boudry district, on a small hill above Lake Neuchâtel.

== Coat of arms ==
The blazon of the municipal coat of arms is Gules two Doves passant standing on a Cross Argent throughout.

== Demographics ==
Colombier had a population (as of 2011) of 5,510. As of 2008, 20.7% of the population are resident foreign nationals. Over the last 10 years (2000–2010) the population has changed at a rate of 16.4%. It has changed at a rate of 14.6% due to migration and at a rate of 1.5% due to births and deaths.

Most of the population (as of 2000) speaks French (4,229 or 86.4%) as their first language, German is the second most common (220 or 4.5%) and Italian is the third (132 or 2.7%). There are 4 people who speak Romansh.

As of 2008, the population was 49.0% male and 51.0% female. The population was made up of 2,139 Swiss men (38.3% of the population) and 600 (10.7%) non-Swiss men. There were 2,363 Swiss women (42.3%) and 484 (8.7%) non-Swiss women. Of the population in the municipality, 892 or about 18.2% were born in Colombier and lived there in 2000. There were 1,646 or 33.6% who were born in the same canton, while 1,119 or 22.9% were born somewhere else in Switzerland, and 1,074 or 21.9% were born outside of Switzerland.

As of 2000, children and teenagers (0–19 years old) make up 24.2% of the population, while adults (20–64 years old) make up 61.1% and seniors (over 64 years old) make up 14.7%.

As of 2000, there were 1,904 people who were single and never married in the municipality. There were 2,441 married individuals, 273 widows or widowers and 279 individuals who are divorced.

As of 2000, there were 2,032 private households in the municipality, and an average of 2.3 persons per household. There were 639 households that consist of only one person and 116 households with five or more people. In 2000, a total of 1,982 apartments (90.8% of the total) were permanently occupied, while 156 apartments (7.1%) were seasonally occupied and 44 apartments (2.0%) were empty. As of 2009, the construction rate of new housing units was 2.1 new units per 1000 residents. The vacancy rate for the municipality, in 2010, was 0.23%.

The historical population is given in the following chart:

== Heritage sites of national significance ==
The Arsenal, the prehistoric lake shore settlement at Baie d‘Auvernier, Colombier Castle with its museum, Roman villa and fortifications, the Domaine de Vaudijon, the House de maître du Bied and the Manoir Le Pontet (house of Béat Louis de Muralt and Isabelle de Charrière) are listed as Swiss heritage sites of national significance. The entire urban village of Colombier and the Areuse region are part of the Inventory of Swiss Heritage Sites.

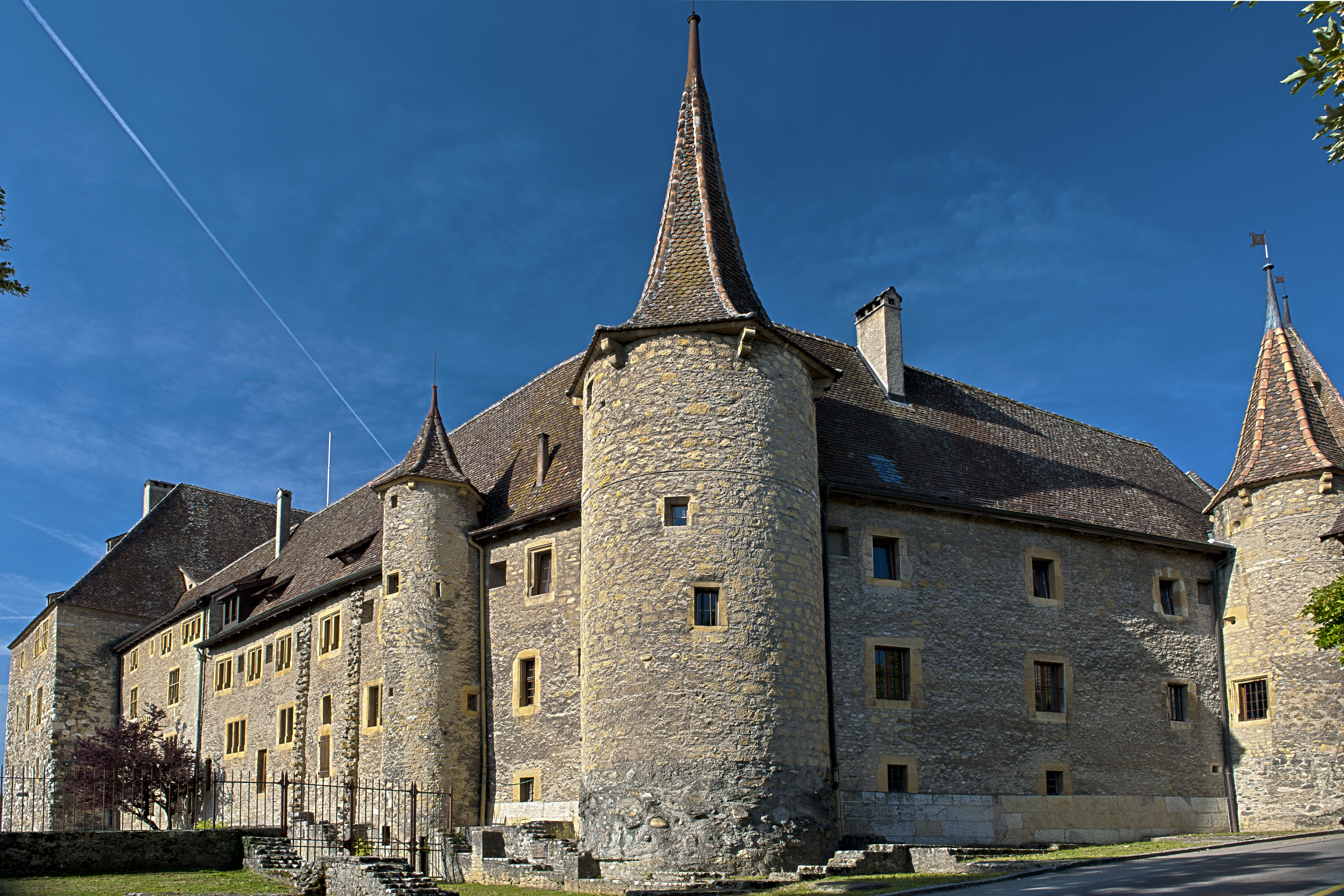
Colombier Castle

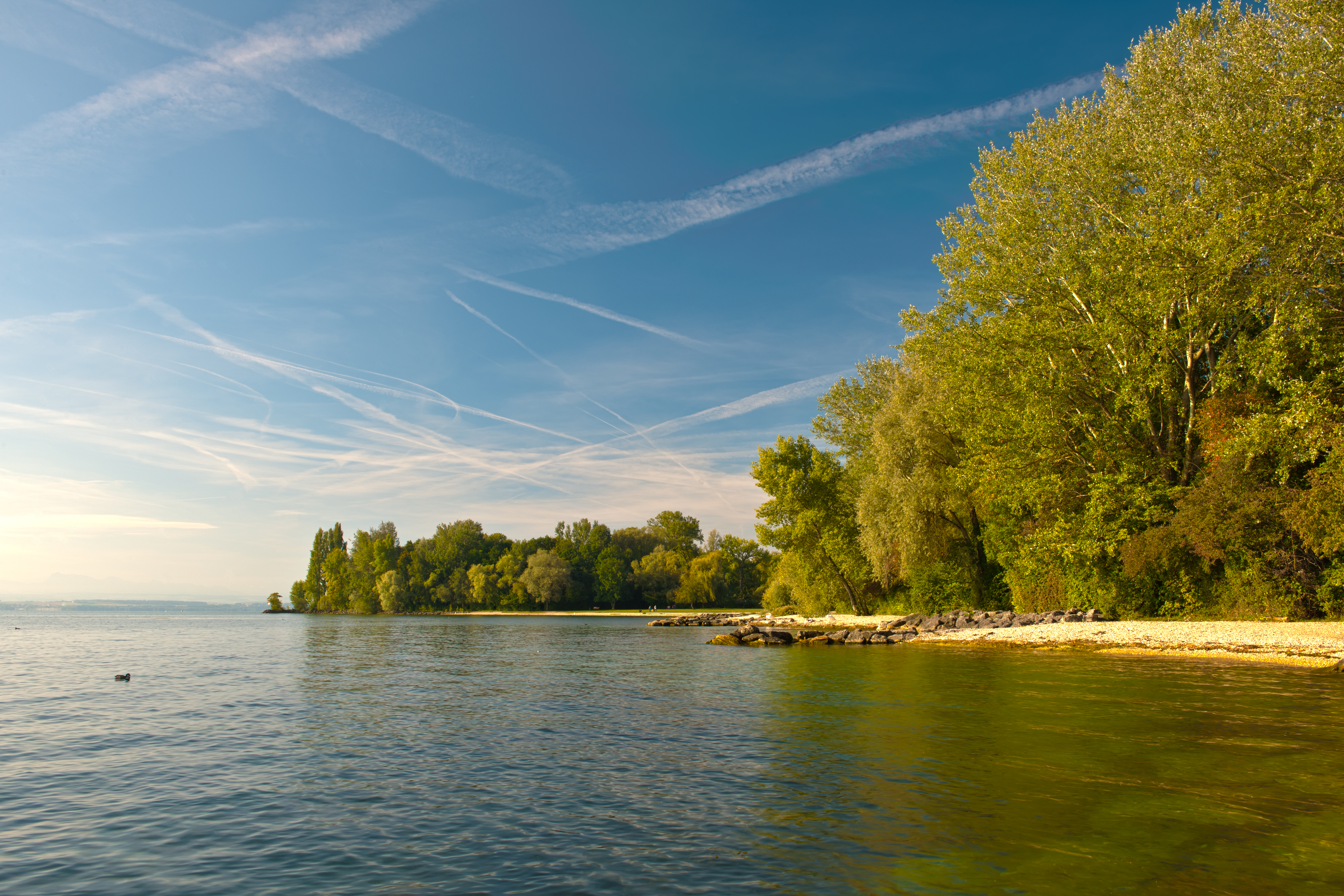
the prehistoric lake shore settlement at Baie d‘Auvernier

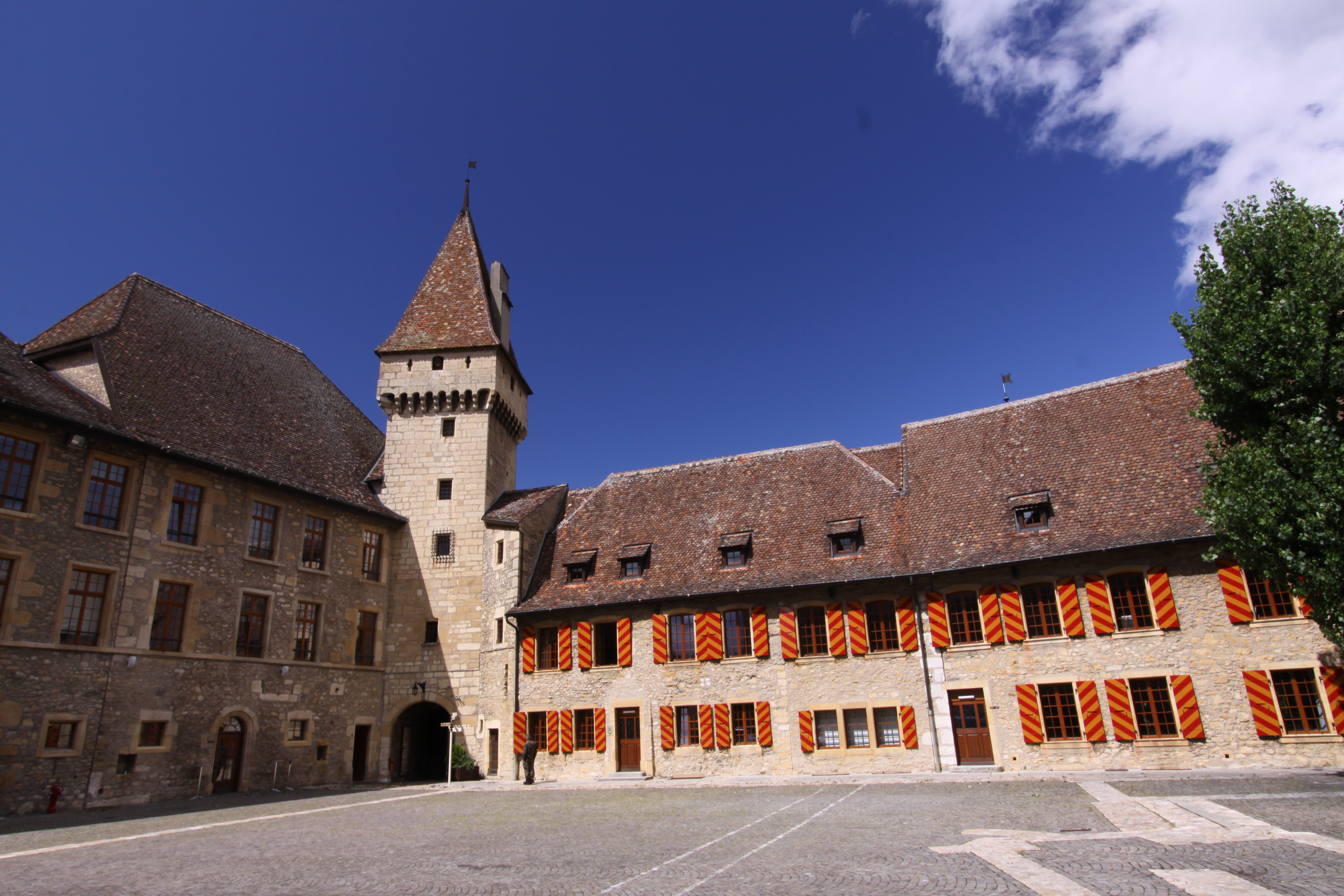
Colombier Castle

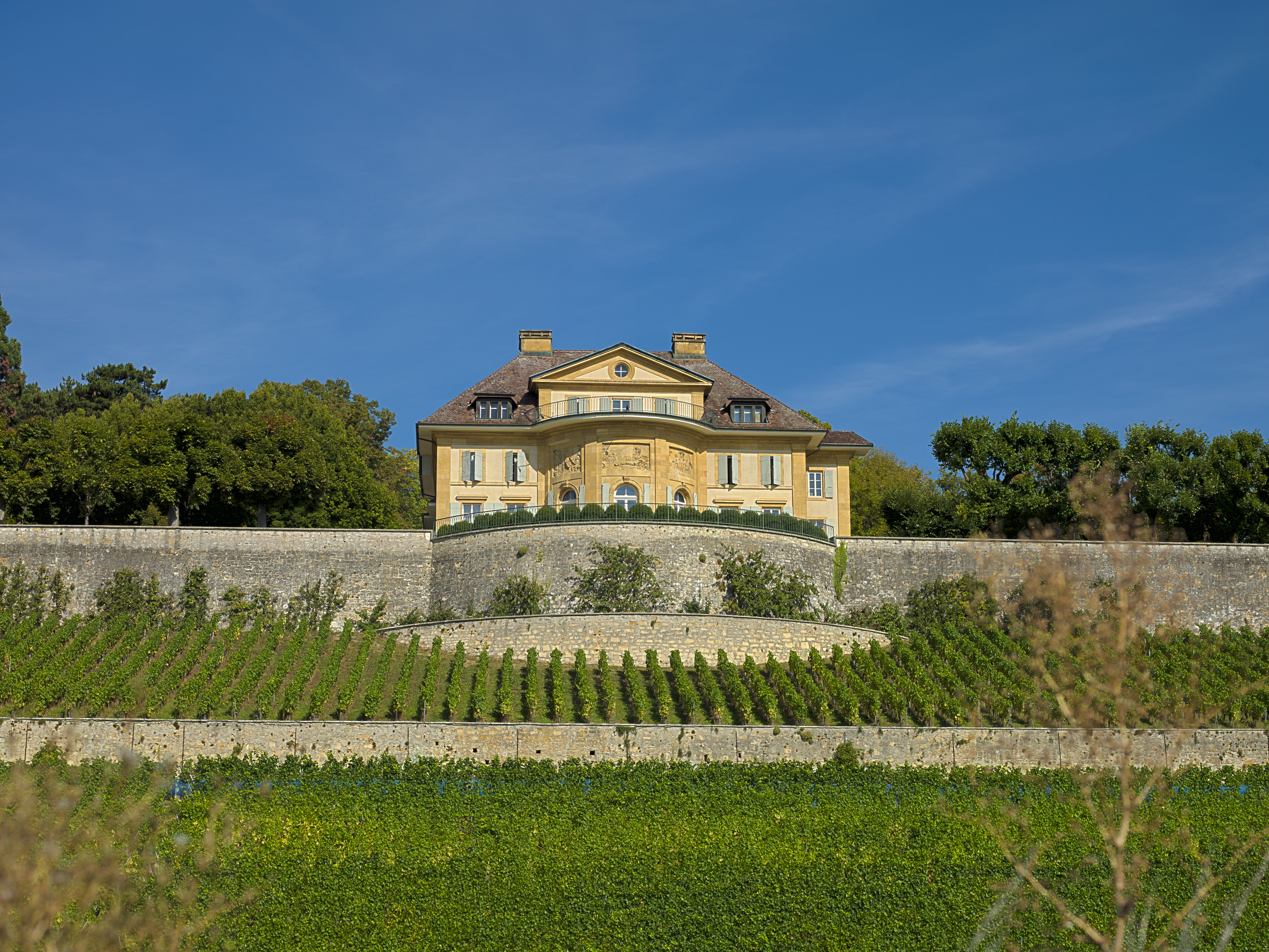
Domaine de Vaudijon

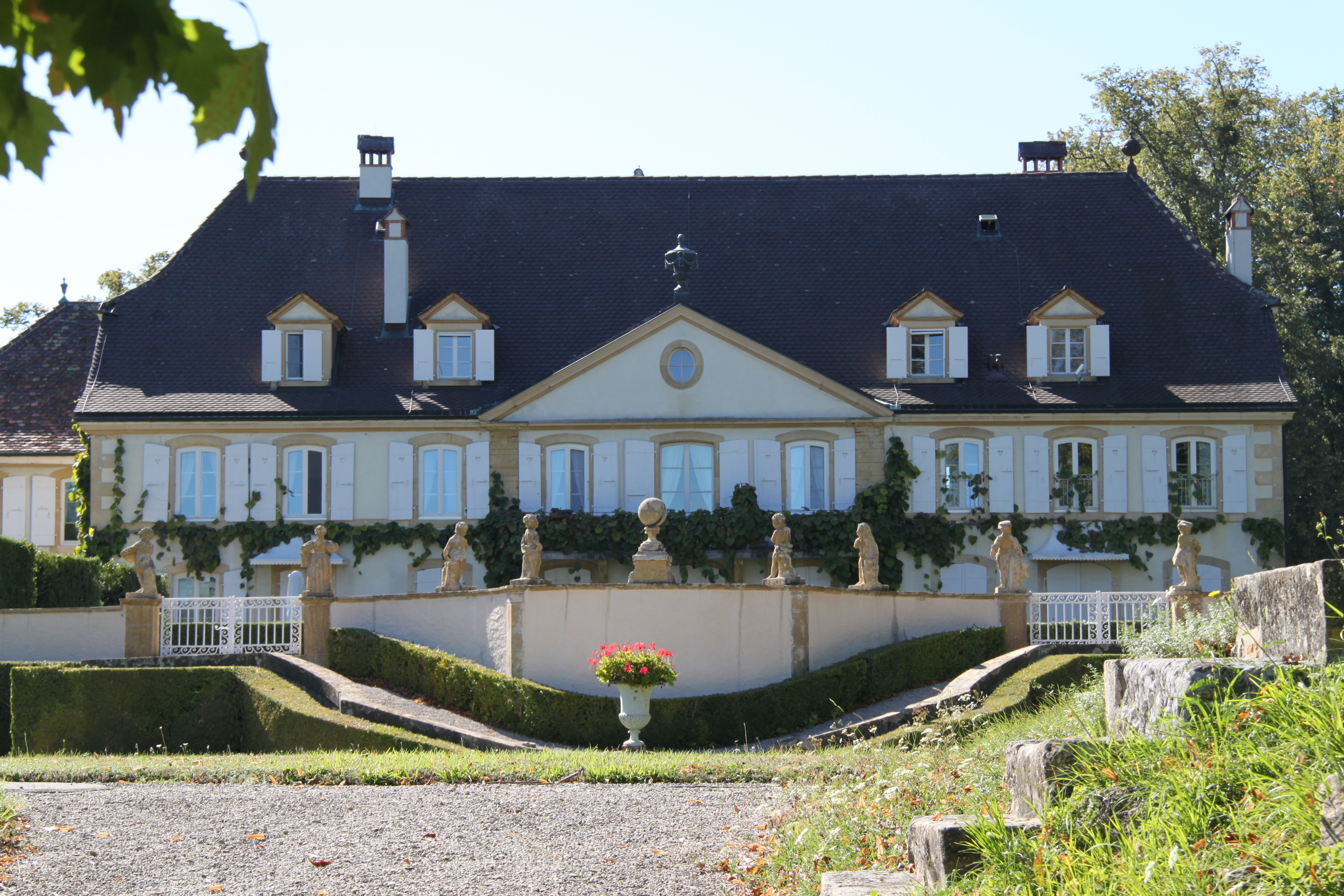
House de maître du Bied

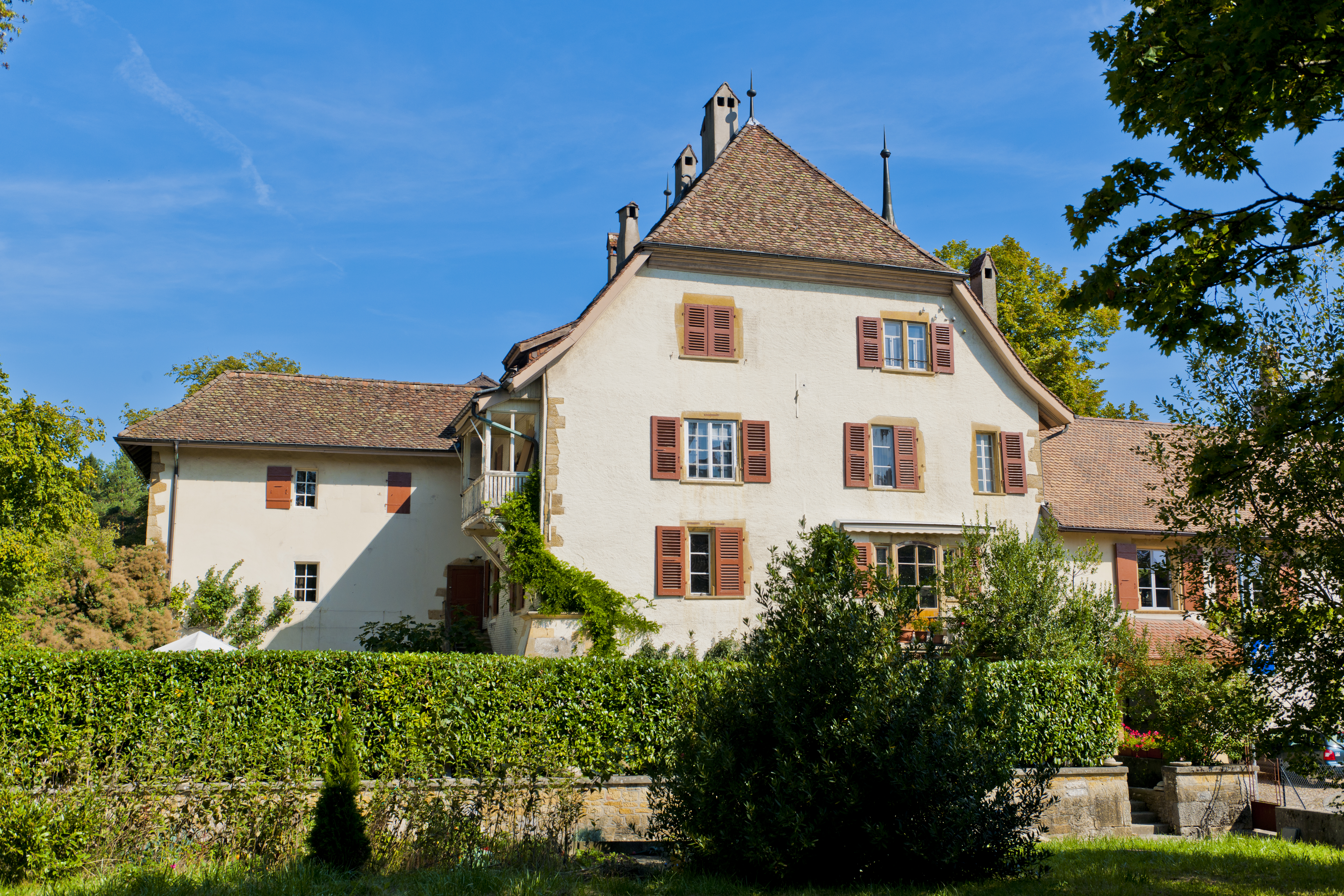
Manoir Le Pontet

== Politics ==
In the 2007 Swiss federal election the most popular party was the SP which received 25.18% of the vote. The next three most popular parties were the SVP (20.67%), the FDP (16.91%) and the LPS Party (14.86%). In the federal election, a total of 1,786 votes were cast, and the voter turnout was 52.5%.

== Economy ==
As of 2010, Colombier had an unemployment rate of 5.8%. As of 2008, there were 43 people employed in the primary economic sector and about 7 businesses involved in this sector. 270 people were employed in the secondary sector and there were 37 businesses in this sector. 1,306 people were employed in the tertiary sector, with 164 businesses in this sector. There were 2,423 residents of the municipality who were employed in some capacity, of which females made up 42.8% of the workforce.

In 2008 the total number of full-time equivalent jobs was 1,366. The number of jobs in the primary sector was 41, all of which were in agriculture. The number of jobs in the secondary sector was 258 of which 130 or (50.4%) were in manufacturing and 81 (31.4%) were in construction. The number of jobs in the tertiary sector was 1,067. In the tertiary sector; 224 or 21.0% were in wholesale or retail sales or the repair of motor vehicles, 42 or 3.9% were in the movement and storage of goods, 69 or 6.5% were in a hotel or restaurant, 10 or 0.9% were in the information industry, 13 or 1.2% were the insurance or financial industry, 71 or 6.7% were technical professionals or scientists, 168 or 15.7% were in education and 119 or 11.2% were in health care.

In 2000, there were 947 workers who commuted into the municipality and 1,826 workers who commuted away. The municipality is a net exporter of workers, with about 1.9 workers leaving the municipality for every one entering. About 1.4% of the workforce coming into Colombier are coming from outside Switzerland. Of the working population, 17.6% used public transportation to get to work, and 62.2% used a private car.

== Religion ==
From the 2000 census, 1,682 or 34.3% were Roman Catholic, while 1,852 or 37.8% belonged to the Swiss Reformed Church. Of the rest of the population, there were 28 members of an Orthodox church (or about 0.57% of the population), there were 6 individuals (or about 0.12% of the population) who belonged to the Christian Catholic Church, and there were 173 individuals (or about 3.53% of the population) who belonged to another Christian church. There were 9 individuals (or about 0.18% of the population) who were Jewish, and 77 (or about 1.57% of the population) who were Islamic. There were 3 individuals who were Buddhist, 2 individuals who were Hindu and 8 individuals who belonged to another church. 901 (or about 18.40% of the population) belonged to no church, are agnostic or atheist, and 239 individuals (or about 4.88% of the population) did not answer the question.

== Education ==
In Colombier about 1,789 or (36.5%) of the population have completed non-mandatory upper secondary education, and 709 or (14.5%) have completed additional higher education (either university or a Fachhochschule). Of the 709 who completed tertiary schooling, 55.7% were Swiss men, 26.4% were Swiss women, 11.1% were non-Swiss men and 6.8% were non-Swiss women.

In the canton of Neuchâtel most municipalities provide two years of non-mandatory kindergarten, followed by five years of mandatory primary education. The next four years of mandatory secondary education is provided at thirteen larger secondary schools, which many students travel out of their home municipality to attend. During the 2010–11 school year, there were 6 kindergarten classes with a total of 116 students in Colombier. In the same year, there were 16 primary classes with a total of 322 students.

As of 2000, there were 493 students in Colombier who came from another municipality, while 241 residents attended schools outside the municipality.

== Sport ==
FC Colombier is the former municipality's football club.
