= Bôle =

- Former municipality
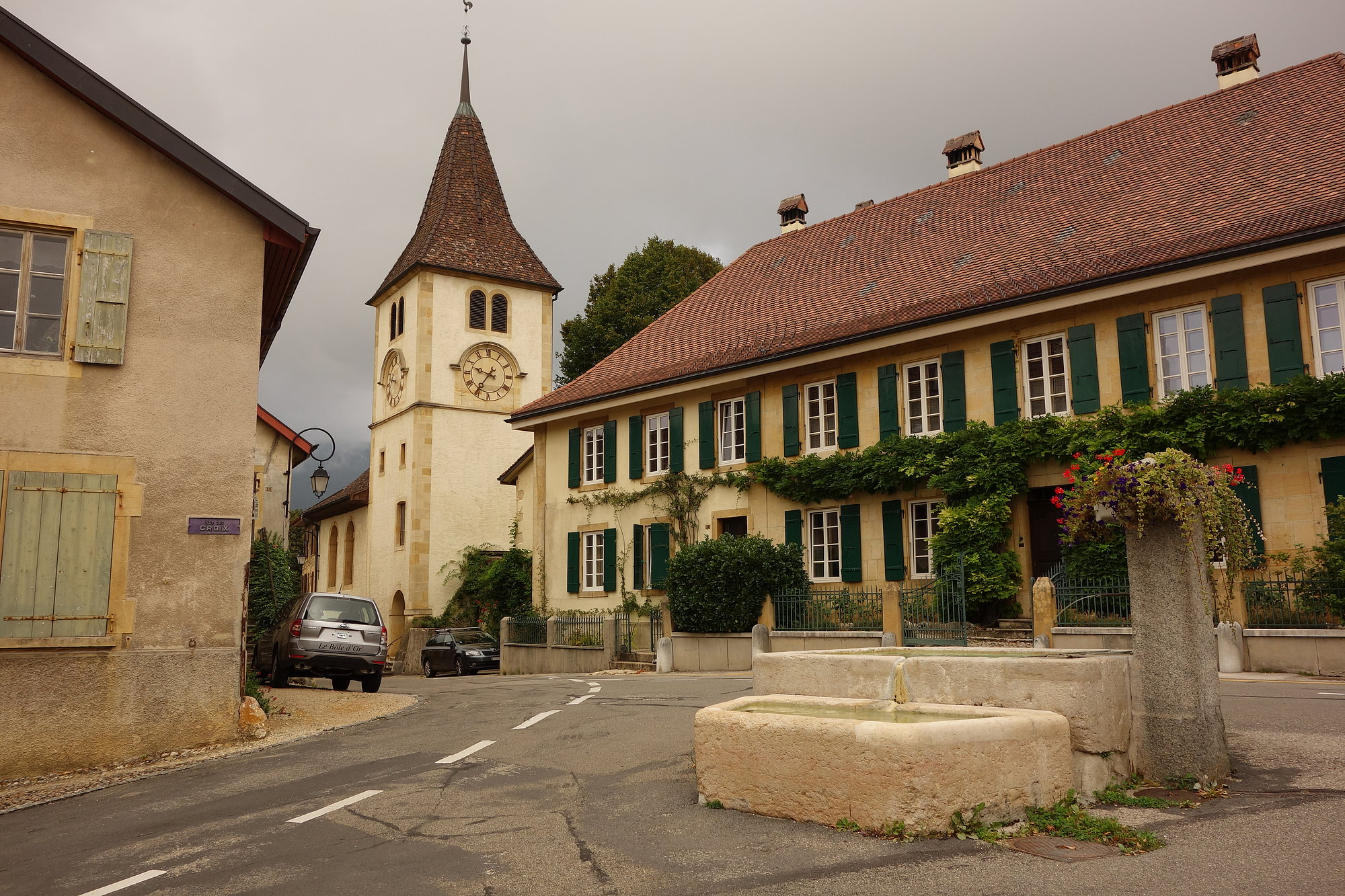

- Coat of arms
- Location of Bôle
- Location within Switzerland Location within Canton of Neuchâtel
- Coordinates: 46°58′N 6°51′E
- Country: Switzerland
- Canton: Neuchâtel
- District: Boudry
- Municipality: Milvignes

Area
  - Total: 2.58 km^{2} (1.00 sq mi)
- Elevation: 523 m (1,716 ft)

Population (December 2011)
  - Total: 1,788
  - Density: 693/km^{2} (1,790/sq mi)
- Time zone: UTC+01:00 (CET)
  - Summer (DST): UTC+02:00 (CEST)
- Postal code: 2014
- SFOS number: 6403
- ISO 3166 code: CH-NE
- Surrounded by: Boudry, Colombier, Rochefort
- Website: www.bole.ne.ch

Bôle (French pronunciation: [bol]) is a former municipality in the district of Boudry in the canton of Neuchâtel in Switzerland. The municipalities of Auvernier, Bôle and Colombier merged on 1 January 2013 into the new municipality of Milvignes.

== History ==
Bôle is first mentioned in 1346 as Boule.

== Geography ==
Aerial view by Walter Mittelholzer (1926)

Bôle had an area, as of 2009, of 2.6 square kilometers (1.0 mi^{2}). Of this area, 0.7 km^{2} (0.27 mi^{2}) or 27.1% is used for agricultural purposes, while 1.16 km^{2} (0.45 mi^{2}) or 45.0% is forested. Of the rest of the land, 0.73 km^{2} (0.28 mi^{2}) or 28.3% is settled (buildings or roads).

Of the built up area, housing and buildings made up 17.4% and transportation infrastructure made up 6.2%. while parks, green belts and sports fields made up 3.1%. Out of the forested land, 43.0% of the total land area is heavily forested and 1.9% is covered with orchards or small clusters of trees. Of the agricultural land, 9.7% is used for growing crops and 10.9% is pastures, while 6.6% is used for orchards or vine crops.

The former municipality is located in the Boudry district, on the slope above the old Roman era road Vy d'Etraz. It consists of the linear village of Bôle.

== Coat of arms ==
The blazon of the municipal coat of arms is Argent, issuant from a base Vert two Pine trees of the same.

== Demographics ==
Bôle had a population (as of 2011) of 1,788. As of 2008, 13.2% of the population are resident foreign nationals. Over the last 10 years (2000–2010 ) the population has changed at a rate of 3.3%. It has changed at a rate of -1.7% due to migration and at a rate of 2.5% due to births and deaths.

Most of the population (as of 2000) speaks French (1,600 or 90.0%) as their first language, German is the second most common (69 or 3.9%) and Italian is the third (28 or 1.6%).

As of 2008, the population was 49.3% male and 50.7% female. The population was made up of 749 Swiss men (42.6% of the population) and 118 (6.7%) non-Swiss men. There were 787 Swiss women (44.7%) and 105 (6.0%) non-Swiss women. Of the population in the municipality, 288 or about 16.2% were born in Bôle and lived there in 2000. There were 731 or 41.1% who were born in the same canton, while 426 or 24.0% were born somewhere else in Switzerland, and 294 or 16.5% were born outside of Switzerland.

As of 2000, children and teenagers (0–19 years old) make up 21.5% of the population, while adults (20–64 years old) make up 60.5% and seniors (over 64 years old) make up 17.9%.

As of 2000, there were 641 people who were single and never married in the municipality. There were 930 married individuals, 124 widows or widowers and 83 individuals who are divorced.

As of 2000, there were 756 private households in the municipality, and an average of 2.3 persons per household. There were 231 households that consist of only one person and 34 households with five or more people. In 2000, a total of 731 apartments (93.4% of the total) were permanently occupied, while 28 apartments (3.6%) were seasonally occupied and 24 apartments (3.1%) were empty. The vacancy rate for the municipality, in 2010, was 0.49%.

The historical population is given in the following chart:

== Politics ==
In the 2007 federal election the most popular party was the SP which received 22.57% of the vote. The next three most popular parties were the SVP (19.87%), the LPS Party (17.6%) and the FDP (14.73%). In the federal election, a total of 670 votes were cast, and the voter turnout was 53.6%.

== Economy ==
As of 2010, Bôle had an unemployment rate of 4.8%. As of 2008, there were 10 people employed in the primary economic sector and about 4 businesses involved in this sector. 205 people were employed in the secondary sector and there were 12 businesses in this sector. 198 people were employed in the tertiary sector, with 42 businesses in this sector. There were 888 residents of the municipality who were employed in some capacity, of which females made up 43.1% of the workforce.

In 2008 the total number of full-time equivalent jobs was 346. The number of jobs in the primary sector was 8, all of which were in agriculture. The number of jobs in the secondary sector was 186 of which 165 or (88.7%) were in manufacturing and 22 (11.8%) were in construction. The number of jobs in the tertiary sector was 152. In the tertiary sector; 52 or 34.2% were in wholesale or retail sales or the repair of motor vehicles, 1 was in the movement and storage of goods, 5 or 3.3% were in a hotel or restaurant, 4 or 2.6% were in the information industry, 2 or 1.3% were the insurance or financial industry, 7 or 4.6% were technical professionals or scientists, 9 or 5.9% were in education and 51 or 33.6% were in health care.

In 2000, there were 264 workers who commuted into the municipality and 717 workers who commuted away. The municipality is a net exporter of workers, with about 2.7 workers leaving the municipality for every one entering. About 3.0% of the workforce coming into Bôle are coming from outside Switzerland. Of the working population, 14.2% used public transportation to get to work, and 68.9% used a private car.

== Religion ==
From the 2000 census, 496 or 27.9% were Roman Catholic, while 775 or 43.6% belonged to the Swiss Reformed Church. Of the rest of the population, there were 3 members of an Orthodox church (or about 0.17% of the population), there were 2 individuals (or about 0.11% of the population) who belonged to the Christian Catholic Church, and there were 108 individuals (or about 6.07% of the population) who belonged to another Christian church. There were 2 individuals (or about 0.11% of the population) who were Jewish, and 16 (or about 0.90% of the population) who were Islamic. There were 2 individuals who were Buddhist, 2 individuals who were Hindu and 1 individual who belonged to another church. 362 (or about 20.36% of the population) belonged to no church, are agnostic or atheist, and 63 individuals (or about 3.54% of the population) did not answer the question.

== Education ==
In Bôle about 732 or (41.2%) of the population have completed non-mandatory upper secondary education, and 302 or (17.0%) have completed additional higher education (either university or a Fachhochschule). Of the 302 who completed tertiary schooling, 59.3% were Swiss men, 26.8% were Swiss women, 10.6% were non-Swiss men and 3.3% were non-Swiss women.

In the canton of Neuchâtel most municipalities provide two years of non-mandatory kindergarten, followed by five years of mandatory primary education. The next four years of mandatory secondary education is provided at thirteen larger secondary schools, which many students travel out of their home municipality to attend. During the 2010–11 school year, there were 2 kindergarten classes with a total of 39 students in Bôle. In the same year, there were 5 primary classes with a total of 82 students.

As of 2000, there were 7 students in Bôle who came from another municipality, while 161 residents attended schools outside the municipality.
