= Colombier Castle =

Castle in Colombier, Switzerland

- Milvignes in Switzerland
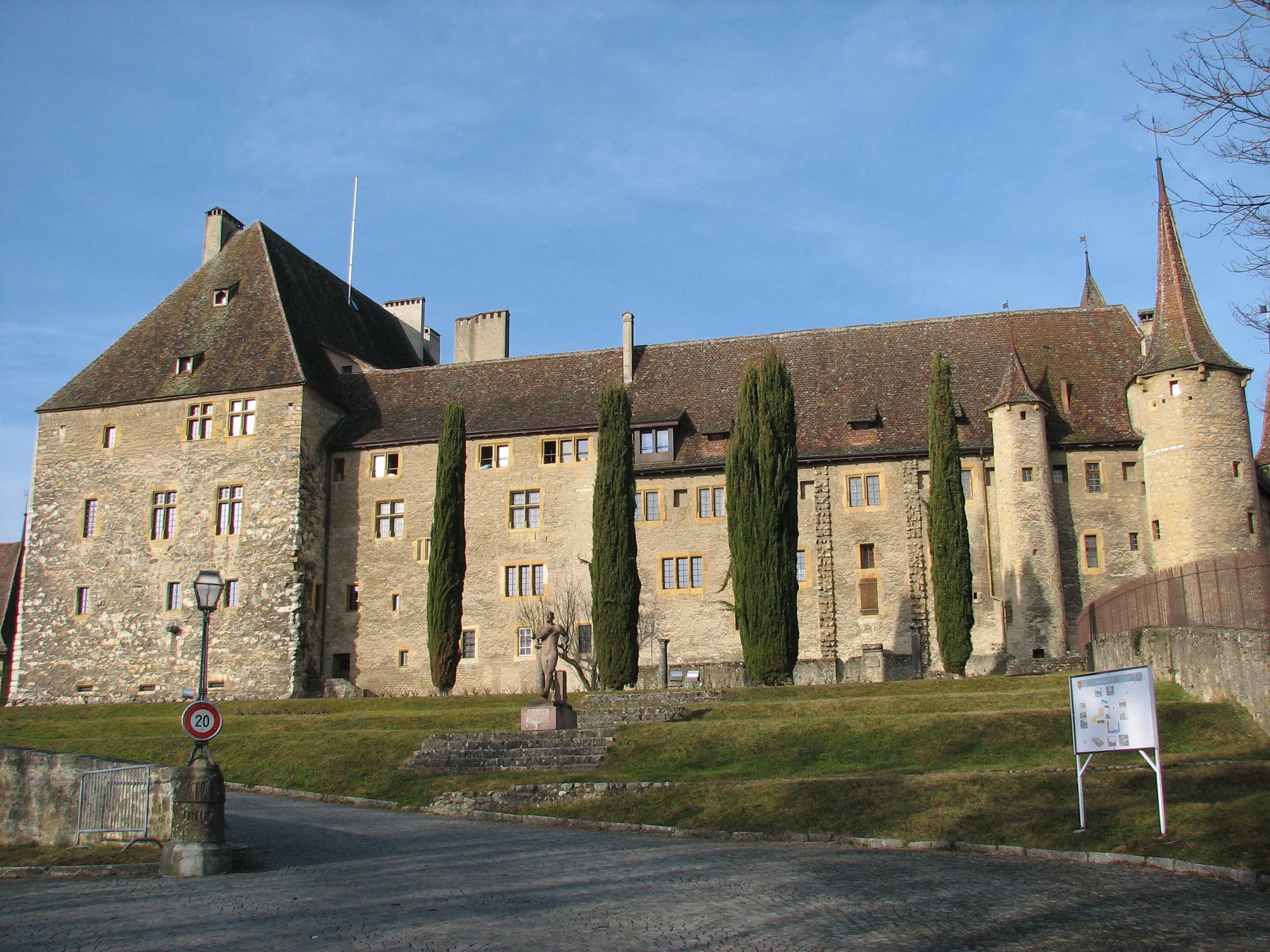
- Colombier castle south face

Site information
- Owner: Swiss military

Location
- Coordinates: 46°57′58″N 6°51′47″E

Site history
- Built: 11th/12th century

Swiss Cultural Property of National Significance

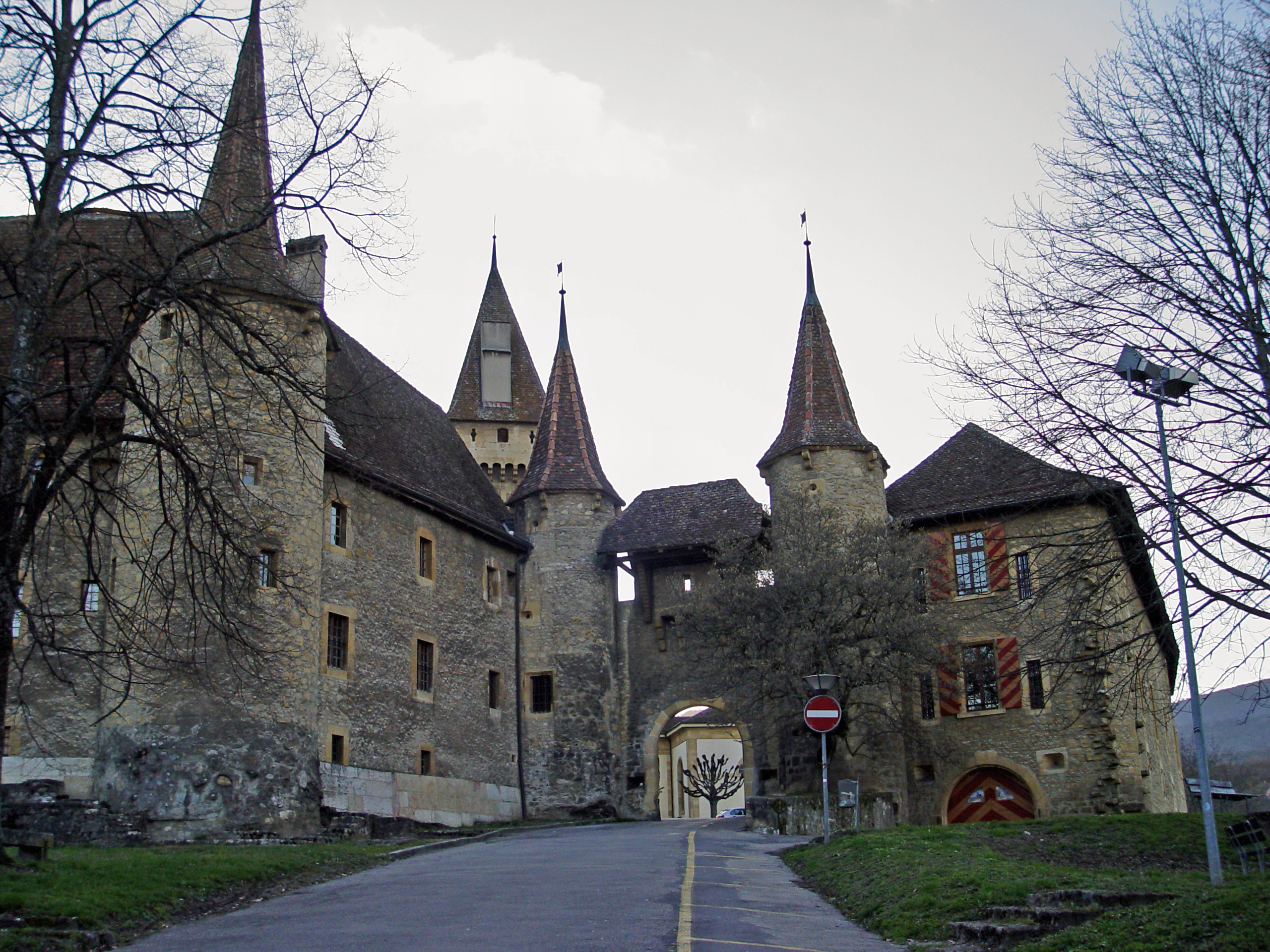
Colombier Castle

Colombier Castle is a castle in the former municipality of Colombier (now part of Milvignes) of the Canton of Neuchâtel in Switzerland. It is a Swiss heritage site of national significance.

== History ==
One of the largest Roman era villas in Switzerland was excavated from under the castle in 1840-42 by Frédéric DuBois de Montperreux. It was built in multiple stages between the 1st and 3rd centuries AD into a palatial mansion with a peristyle, at least two baths with mosaics and frescoes and terraced gardens. In the 11th or 12th century a fortified tower was built over the ruins of the Roman villa. It expanded in the 13th Century and by the 16th century had reached its present appearance.

In 1806, Colombier Castle was converted into a military hospital. Starting in 1824 it was used by the Federal militias as a parade ground and was converted into a barracks and given an expanded arsenal. In 1877 it became the official barracks of the 2. Division, which later became Field Division 2. In 2003, the Army XXI reforms dissolved the Division and in 2004 the barracks became an infantry training center.

== See also ==
- List of castles in Switzerland
- Château

== Archive sources ==
Several collections kept in the "Archives de l'État de Neuchâtel" contain information about Colombier Castle :

- PLA, Fonds: Plans et cartes. Archives de l'État de Neuchâtel.
- RC, Fonds: Reconnaissances (1401-1836). Archives de l'État de Neuchâtel.
- AS, Fonds: Archives seigneuriales (1143-1707). Archives de l'État de Neuchâtel.
- NC, Fonds: Notes Courvoisier. Archives de l'État de Neuchâtel.
