= Auvernier =

- Former municipality
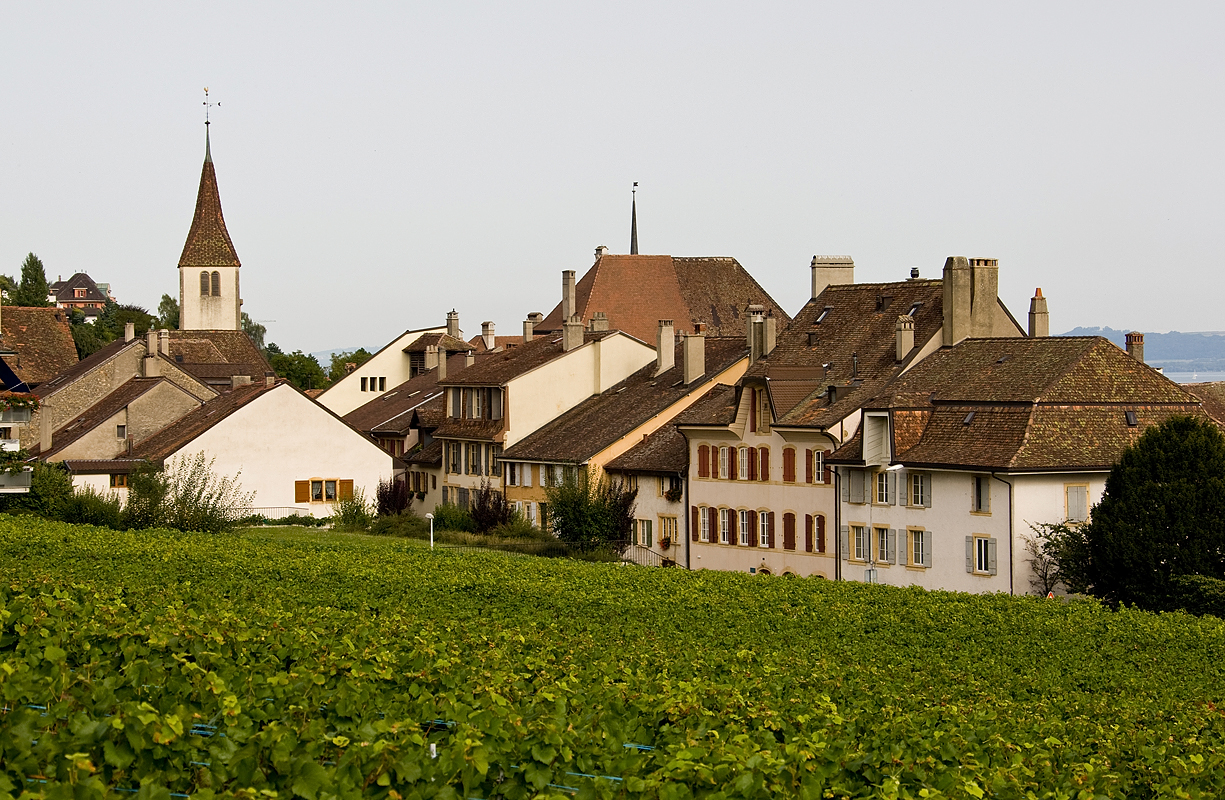
- Auvernier village

- Flag Coat of arms
- Location of Auvernier
- Location within Switzerland Location within Canton of Neuchâtel
- Coordinates: 46°59′N 6°53′E
- Country: Switzerland
- Canton: Neuchâtel
- District: Boudry
- Municipality: Milvignes

Area
  - Total: 1.69 km^{2} (0.65 sq mi)
- Elevation: 433 m (1,421 ft)

Population (December 2011)
  - Total: 1,589
  - Density: 940/km^{2} (2,440/sq mi)
- Time zone: UTC+01:00 (CET)
  - Summer (DST): UTC+02:00 (CEST)
- Postal code: 2012
- SFOS number: 6401
- ISO 3166 code: CH-NE
- Surrounded by: Colombier, Corcelles-Cormondrèche, Neuchâtel, Peseux
- Website: www.auvernier.ch

Auvernier (French pronunciation: [ovɛʁnje]) is a village in the district of Boudry in the canton of Neuchâtel in Switzerland. The municipalities of Auvernier, Bôle and Colombier merged on 1 January 2013 into the new municipality of Milvignes.

== History ==
Settlement has flourished since the Bronze Age in the vicinity of Auvernier, as evidenced by the large amount of material excavated by archaeologists, some of which is now in the British Museum, including a hoard of penannular bracelets and armlets with geometric decoration. Auvernier is first mentioned in 1011 as Averniacum. The municipality was formerly known by its German name Avernach, however, that name is no longer used.

== Geography ==
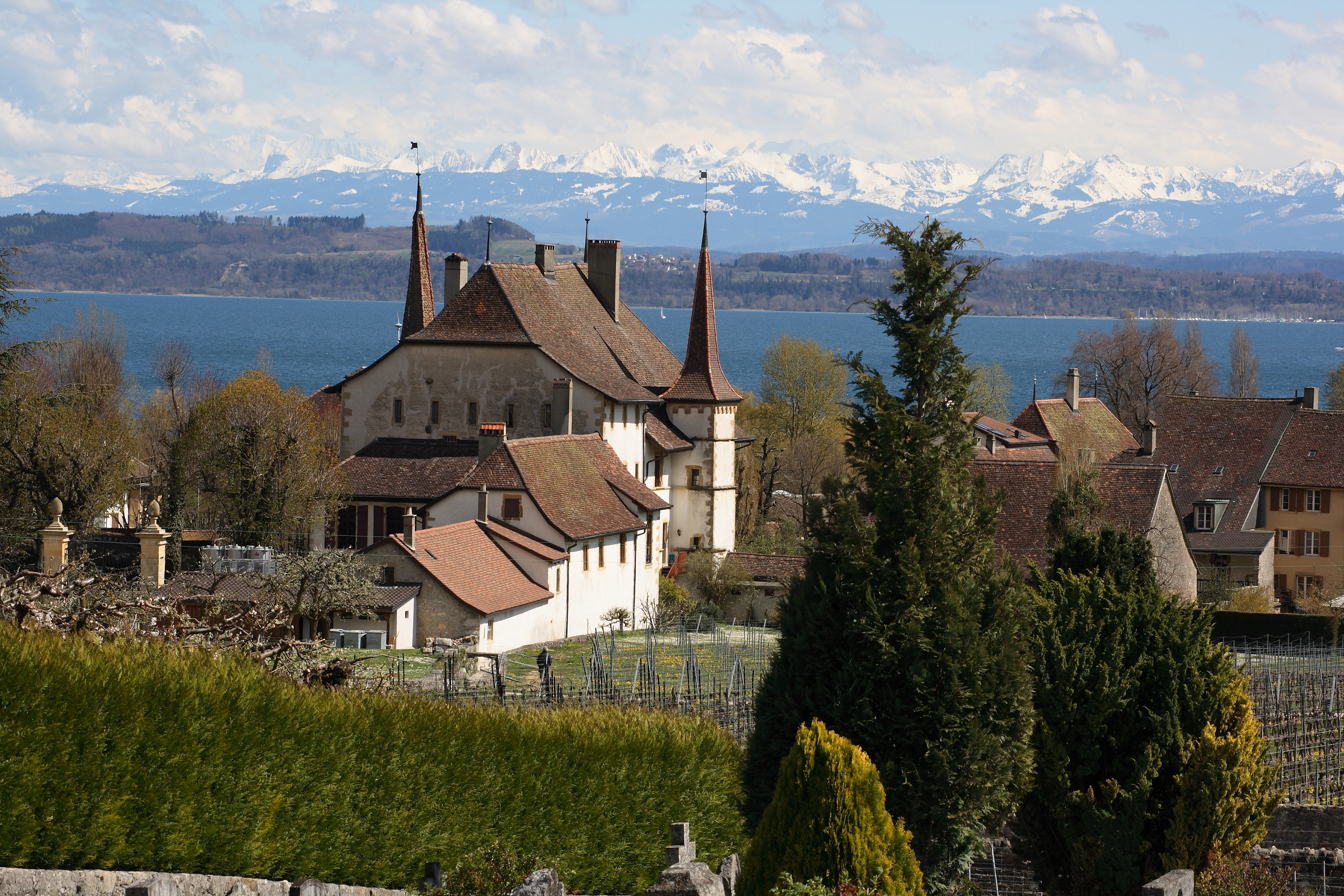
Auvernier village on Lake Neuchatel

Aerial view (1954)

Auvernier had an area, as of 2009, of 1.7 square kilometers (0.66 mi^{2}). Of this area, 0.79 km^{2} (0.31 mi^{2}) or 47.0% is used for agricultural purposes, while 0.06 km^{2} (0.023 mi^{2}) or 3.6% is forested. Of the rest of the land, 0.8 km^{2} (0.31 mi^{2}) or 47.6% is settled (buildings or roads), 0.04 km^{2} (9.9 acres) or 2.4% is either rivers or lakes and 0.01 km^{2} (2.5 acres) or 0.6% is unproductive land.

Of the built up area, industrial buildings made up 1.2% of the total area while housing and buildings made up 19.6% and transportation infrastructure made up 20.8%. Power and water infrastructure as well as other special developed areas made up 1.2% of the area while parks, green belts and sports fields made up 4.8%. Out of the forested land, all of the forested land area is covered with heavy forests. Of the agricultural land, 0.0% is used for growing crops, while 46.4% is used for orchards or vine crops. Of the water in the municipality, 1.8% is in lakes and 0.6% is in rivers and streams.

The former municipality is located in the Boudry district, on the north-west bank of Lake Neuchatel.

== Coat of arms ==
The blazon of the municipal coat of arms is Azure, a Perch nainaint Argent.

== Demographics ==
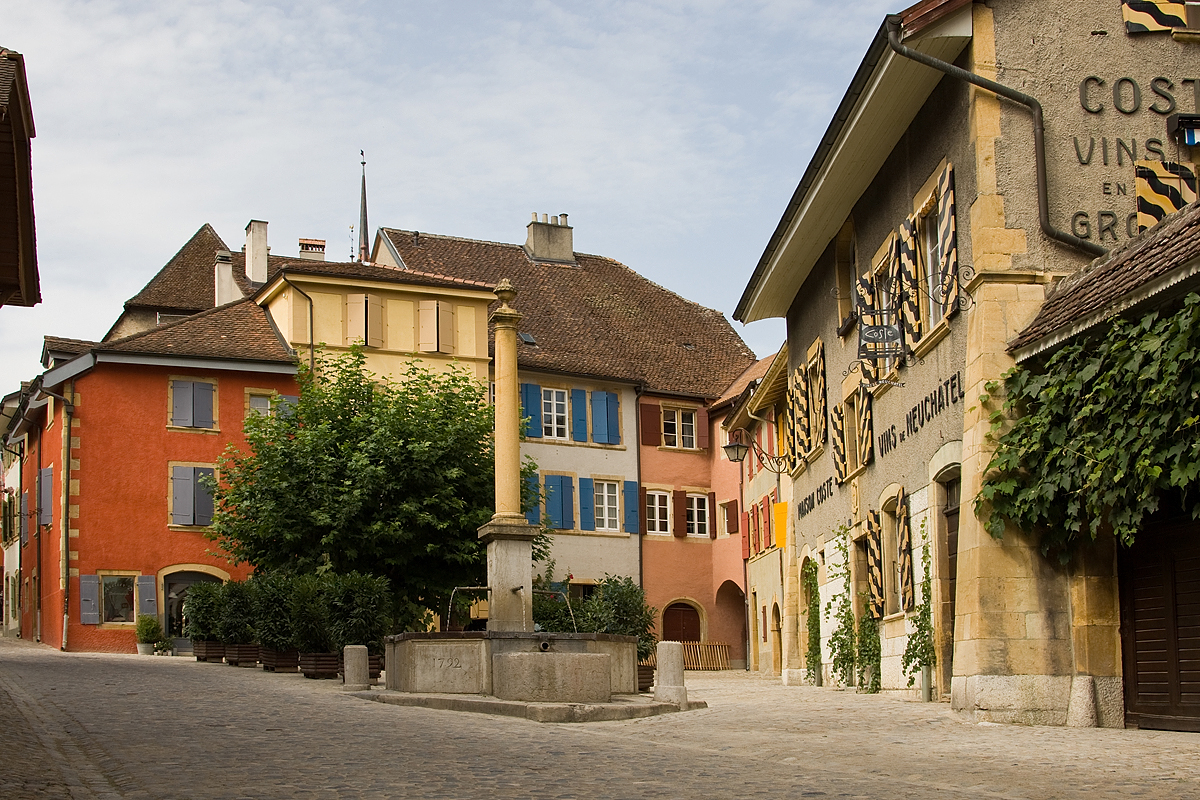
Main street in Auvernier

Auvernier had a population (as of 2011) of 1,589. As of 2008, 13.3% of the population are resident foreign nationals. Over the last 10 years (2000–2010 ) the population has changed at a rate of 2.1%. It has changed at a rate of 4.2% due to migration and at a rate of -0.5% due to births and deaths.

Most of the population (as of 2000) speaks French (1,322 or 86.2%) as their first language, German is the second most common (102 or 6.7%) and Italian is the third (31 or 2.0%). There is 1 person who speaks Romansh.

As of 2008, the population was 48.2% male and 51.8% female. The population was made up of 627 Swiss men (39.2% of the population) and 144 (9.0%) non-Swiss men. There were 727 Swiss women (45.5%) and 100 (6.3%) non-Swiss women. Of the population in the municipality, 290 or about 18.9% were born in Auvernier and lived there in 2000. There were 569 or 37.1% who were born in the same canton, while 369 or 24.1% were born somewhere else in Switzerland, and 263 or 17.2% were born outside of Switzerland.

As of 2000, children and teenagers (0–19 years old) make up 20.3% of the population, while adults (20–64 years old) make up 60.5% and seniors (over 64 years old) make up 19.2%.

As of 2000, there were 595 people who were single and never married in the municipality. There were 733 married individuals, 107 widows or widowers and 98 individuals who are divorced.

As of 2000, there were 680 private households in the municipality, and an average of 2.2 persons per household. There were 242 households that consist of only one person and 37 households with five or more people. In 2000, a total of 657 apartments (91.5% of the total) were permanently occupied, while 43 apartments (6.0%) were seasonally occupied and 18 apartments (2.5%) were empty. As of 2009, the construction rate of new housing units was 3.1 new units per 1000 residents. The vacancy rate for the municipality, in 2010, was 1.7%.

The historical population is given in the following chart:

== Heritage sites ==
The prehistoric lake shore settlement at Baie D‘Auvernier and Auvernier Castle are listed as Swiss heritage site of national significance. The entire village of Auvernier is part of the Inventory of Swiss Heritage Sites.

=== World heritage site ===
It is home to the La Saunerie and Les Graviers prehistoric pile-dwelling (or stilt house) settlements which are part of the Prehistoric Pile dwellings around the Alps UNESCO World Heritage Site.

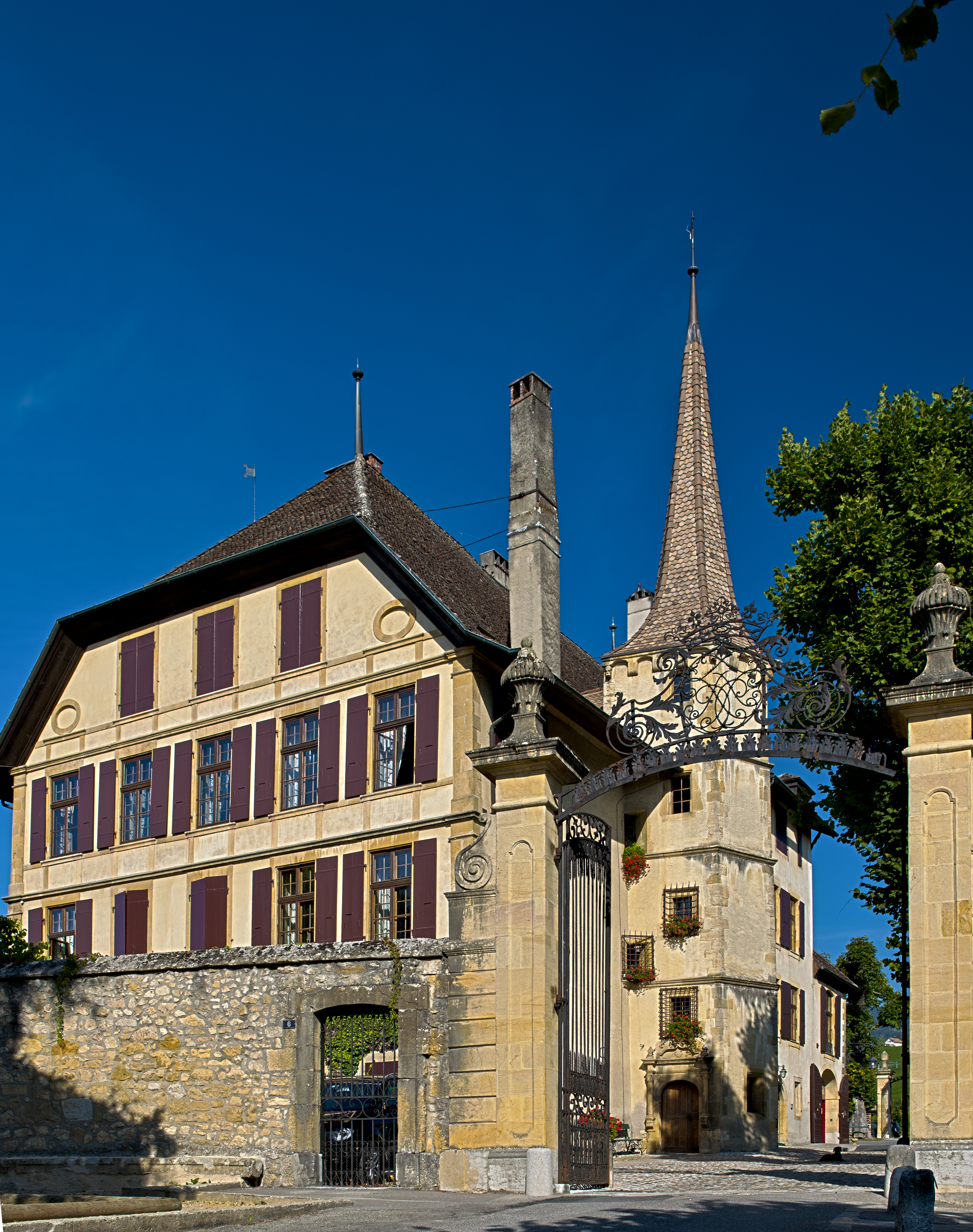
Auvernier Castle

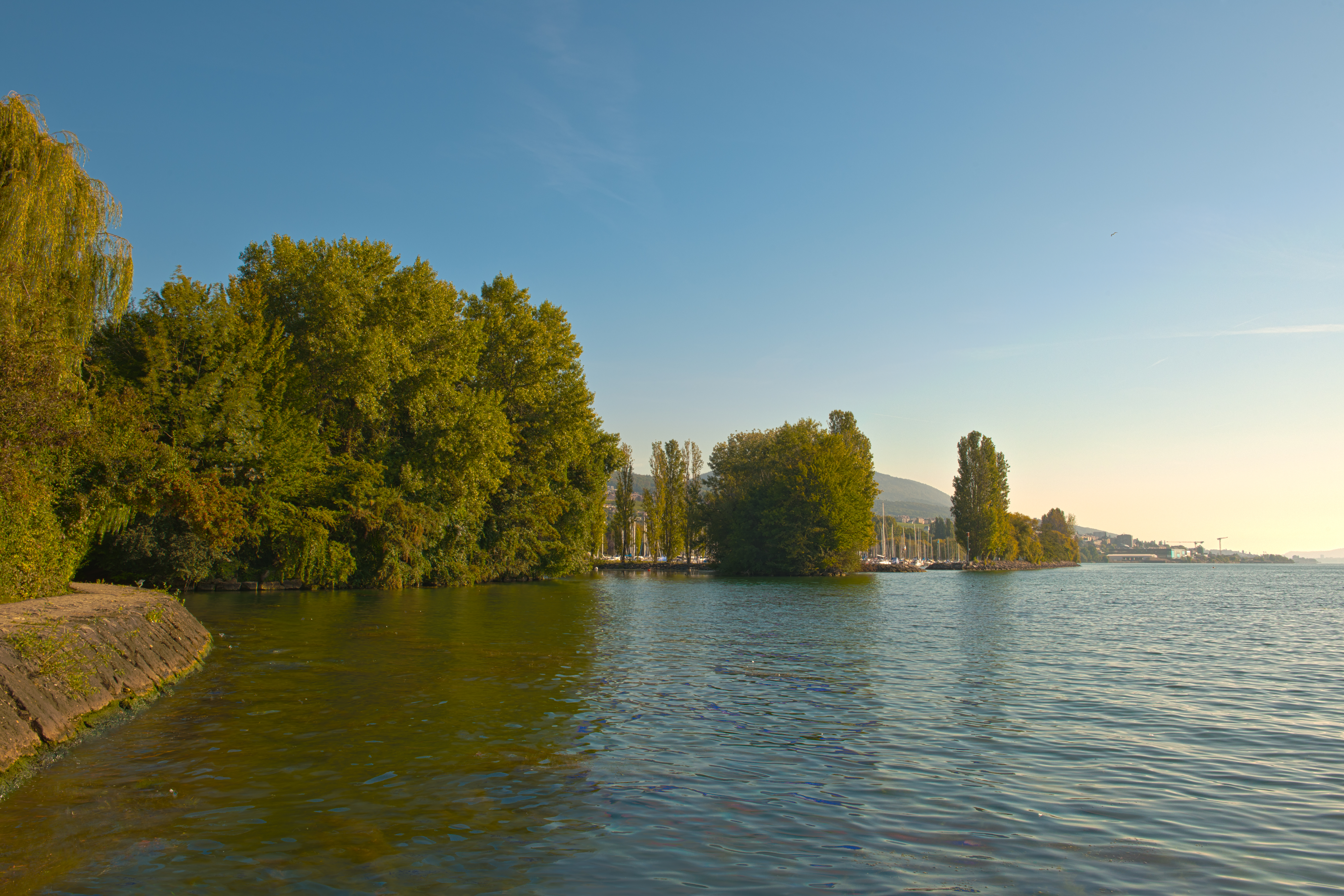
Site of the Baie d'Auvernier prehistoric settlement

=== Archaeology ===
Auvernier has given its name to the Auvernier culture, an archaeological culture of the Late Neolithic period (2700–2400 BC) that was widespread in Western Switzerland, particularly in the Three Lakes Region.

First described in 1969 by Christian Strahm, the culture takes its name from the site of Auvernier - La Saunerie. The Auvernier culture, also considered a regional group of the Saône-Rhône culture of eastern France, shows strong similarities in its pottery with that of the Rhône plain and the eastern French Jura. From around 2735 BC, locally manufactured vessels from the region integrated forms and decorations from Corded Ware pottery, resulting in the Auvernier-Cordé mixed culture. Remains of this culture have been unearthed at many lakeside settlements in the Three Lakes Region, with the Auvernier culture being succeeded by the Bell Beaker culture (2450/2400–2200 BC).

== Politics ==
In the 2007 federal election the most popular party was the SVP which received 21.72% of the vote. The next three most popular parties were the LPS Party (19.9%), the FDP (19.85%) and the SP (19.37%). In the federal election, a total of 702 votes were cast, and the voter turnout was 60.4%.

== Economy ==
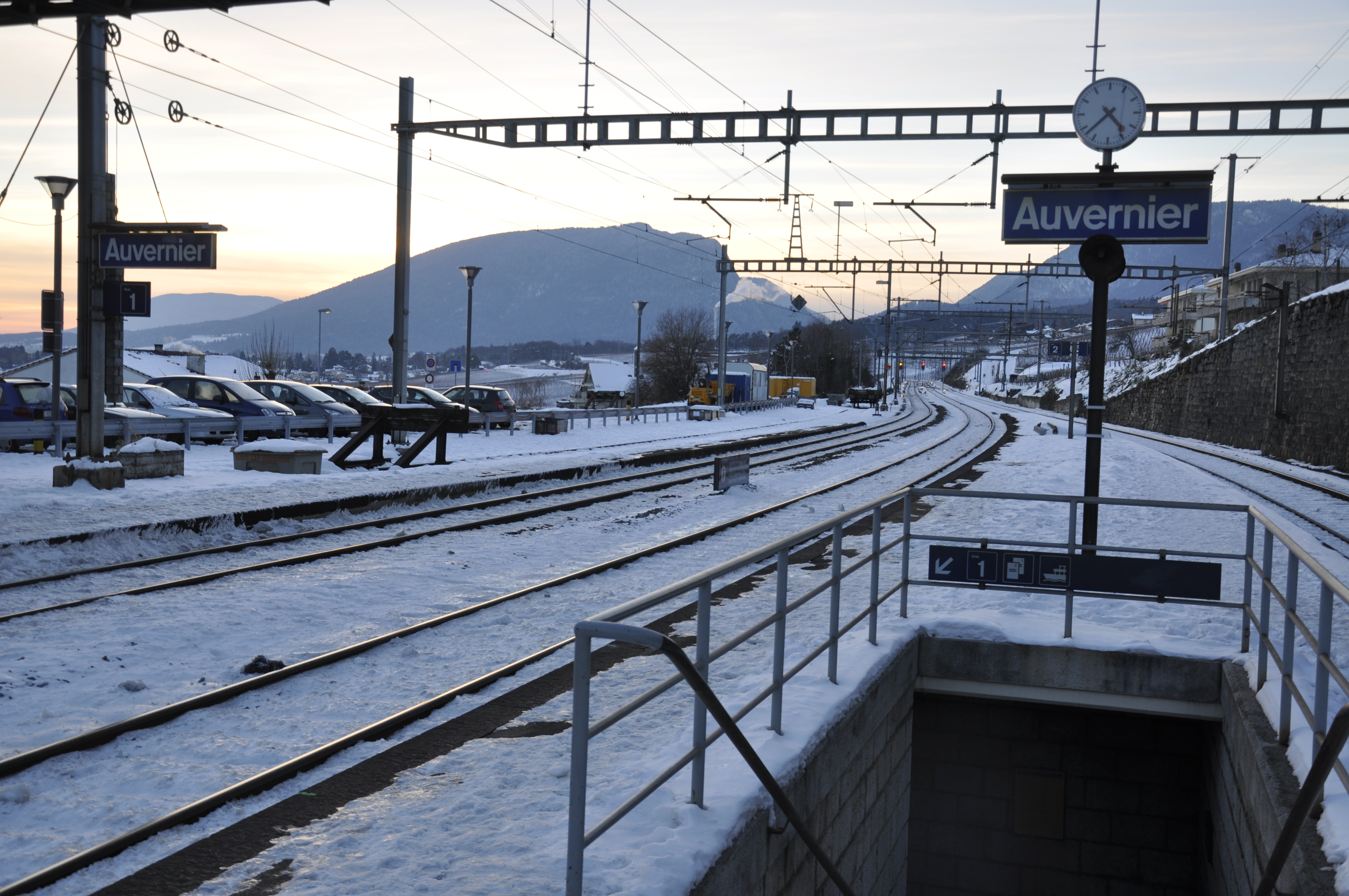
Auvernier train station

As of 2010, Auvernier had an unemployment rate of 3%. As of 2008, there were 43 people employed in the primary economic sector and about 12 businesses involved in this sector. 117 people were employed in the secondary sector and there were 14 businesses in this sector. 236 people were employed in the tertiary sector, with 68 businesses in this sector. There were 754 residents of the municipality who were employed in some capacity, of which females made up 41.5% of the workforce.

In 2008 the total number of full-time equivalent jobs was 345. The number of jobs in the primary sector was 36, of which 31 were in agriculture, 4 were in forestry or lumber production and 1 was in fishing or fisheries. The number of jobs in the secondary sector was 112 of which 94 or (83.9%) were in manufacturing and 18 (16.1%) were in construction. The number of jobs in the tertiary sector was 197. In the tertiary sector; 48 or 24.4% were in wholesale or retail sales or the repair of motor vehicles, 6 or 3.0% were in the movement and storage of goods, 30 or 15.2% were in a hotel or restaurant, 2 or 1.0% were in the information industry, 3 or 1.5% were the insurance or financial industry, 41 or 20.8% were technical professionals or scientists, 9 or 4.6% were in education and 13 or 6.6% were in health care.

In 2000, there were 262 workers who commuted into the municipality and 595 workers who commuted away. The municipality is a net exporter of workers, with about 2.3 workers leaving the municipality for every one entering. About 1.9% of the workforce coming into Auvernier are coming from outside Switzerland. Of the working population, 18.4% used public transportation to get to work, and 61.9% used a private car.

== Religion ==
From the 2000 census, 350 or 22.8% were Roman Catholic, while 715 or 46.6% belonged to the Swiss Reformed Church. Of the rest of the population, there were 7 members of an Orthodox church (or about 0.46% of the population), there were 9 individuals (or about 0.59% of the population) who belonged to the Christian Catholic Church, and there were 22 individuals (or about 1.44% of the population) who belonged to another Christian church. There were 8 individuals (or about 0.52% of the population) who were Jewish, and 3 (or about 0.20% of the population) who were Islamic. There were 4 individuals who were Buddhist. 366 (or about 23.87% of the population) belonged to no church, are agnostic or atheist, and 57 individuals (or about 3.72% of the population) did not answer the question.

== Education ==
In Auvernier about 588 or (38.4%) of the population have completed non-mandatory upper secondary education, and 365 or (23.8%) have completed additional higher education (either university or a Fachhochschule). Of the 365 who completed tertiary schooling, 55.9% were Swiss men, 31.8% were Swiss women, 8.2% were non-Swiss men and 4.1% were non-Swiss women.

In the canton of Neuchâtel most municipalities provide two years of non-mandatory kindergarten, followed by five years of mandatory primary education. The next four years of mandatory secondary education is provided at thirteen larger secondary schools, which many students travel out of their home municipality to attend. During the 2010–11 school year, there was one kindergarten class with a total of 18 students in Auvernier. In the same year, there were 4 primary classes with a total of 72 students.

As of 2000, there were 136 students from Auvernier who attended schools outside the municipality.

== Notable people ==
- Violaine Blétry-de Montmollin, Swiss politician
