= Auvernier Castle =

Castle in Auvernier, Switzerland

Coordinates: 46°58′29″N 6°52′37″E

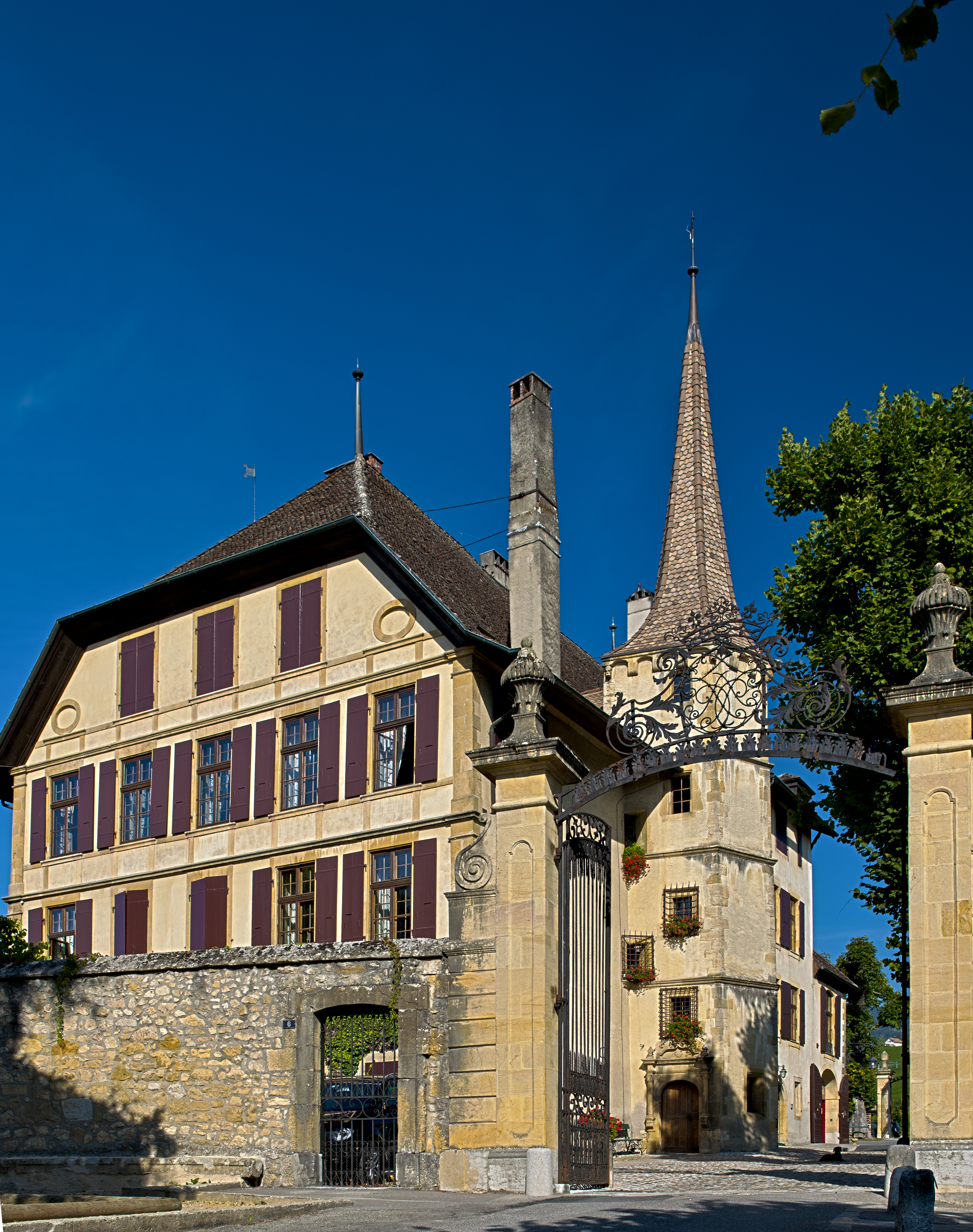
Auvernier Castle

Auvernier Castle (French: Château d'Auvernier) is a castle in the municipality of Auvernier of the Canton of Neuchâtel in Switzerland. It is a Swiss heritage site of national significance. The castle was owned by the de Montmollin family.

== See also ==
- List of castles in Switzerland
- Château
