= Estavayer =

- Municipality
- Old City of Estavayer-le-Lac

- Flag Coat of arms
- Location of Estavayer
- Location within Switzerland Location within Canton of Fribourg
- Coordinates: 46°50′N 6°50′E
- Country: Switzerland
- Canton: Fribourg
- District: Broye

Government
  - Mayor: André Losey

Area
  - Total: 40.36 km^{2} (15.58 sq mi)
- Lowest elevation (Lake Neuchâtel): 429 m (1,407 ft)

Population (Dec 2015)
  - Total: 9,262
  - Density: 229.5/km^{2} (594.4/sq mi)
- Time zone: UTC+01:00 (CET)
  - Summer (DST): UTC+02:00 (CEST)
- Postal code: 1470
- SFOS number: 2054
- ISO 3166 code: CH-FR
- Surrounded by: Les Montets, Cheyres, Payerne (VD), Gorgier (NE), Lully, Saint-Aubin-Sauges (NE), Sévaz, Vaumarcus (NE), Grandcour (VD), Châbles, Chavannes-le-Chêne (VD)
- Website: https://www.estavayer.ch/

Estavayer (French pronunciation: [ɛstavaje]; Arpitan: Thavalyi [θavaˈʎi]) is a municipality of the canton of Fribourg, situated on the south shore of Lake Neuchâtel. Estavayer is located between Yverdon and Bern. It is the capital of the district of Broye. It was created on 1 January 2017 when the former municipalities of Bussy, Estavayer-le-Lac, Morens, Murist, Rueyres-les-Prés, Vernay and Vuissens merged to form Estavayer.

Aerial view from 500 m by Walter Mittelholzer (1919)

== History ==
=== Bussy ===
Bussy is first mentioned in 1142 as Bussey.

=== Morens ===
Morens is first mentioned in 1216 as Morens.

=== Murist ===
Murist is first mentioned in 1228 as Muris.

=== Rueyres-les-Prés ===
Rueyres-les-Prés is first mentioned in 1288 as en Ruere.

=== Vernay ===
Vernay was created on 1 January 2006 from the merger of the municipalities of Autavaux, Forel and Montbrelloz.

== Geography ==
Estavayer has an area, as of 2009, of 40.13 km^{2} (15.49 sq mi).

== Population ==
The new municipality has a population (as of December 2020) of 9,988.

== Historic Population ==
The historical population is given in the following chart:

== Heritage sites of national significance ==
The De Rivaz Chapel, the Sacré-Coeur Chapel, the Chenaux Castle, the Collegiate church of Saint-Laurent, the Convent of the Dominican nuns, the town fortifications, the House de la Dîme and the House des Sires d’Estavayer in Estavayer-le-Lac, the Church of Saint-Maurice in Bussy, the Saint-Pierre Church and the La Molière tower in Murist listed as Swiss heritage site of national significance. The entire town of Estavayer-le-Lac and the villages of Bussy and Vuissens are part of the Inventory of Swiss Heritage Sites. From the 2012 merger of Font into Estavayer-le-Lac, the Gallo-Roman villa at La Vuardaz and the entire Font area (shared between Châbles and Font) were added.

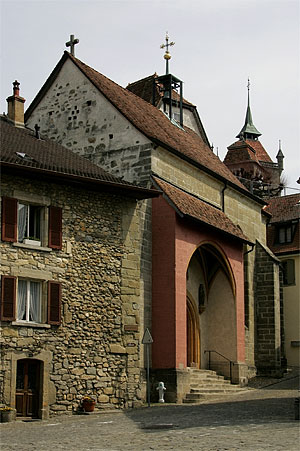
De Rivaz Chapel

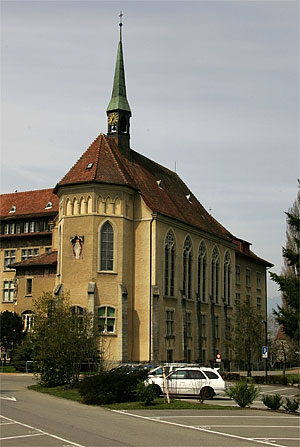
Sacré-Coeur Chapel

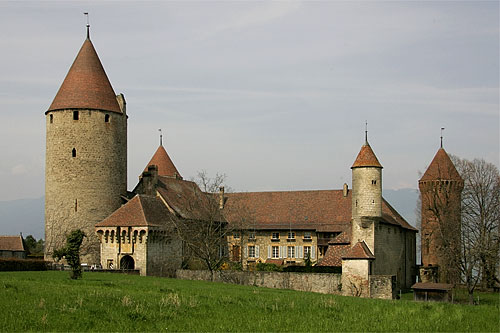
Chenaux Castle

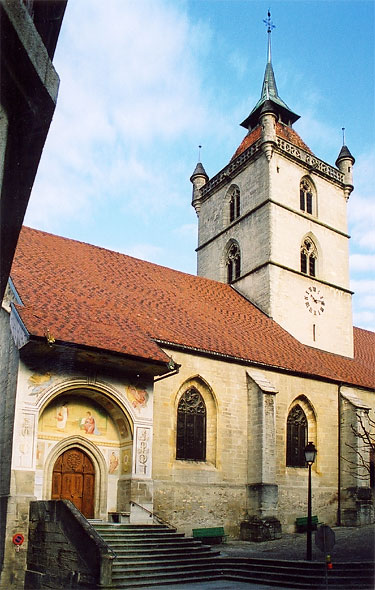
Collegiate church of Saint-Laurent

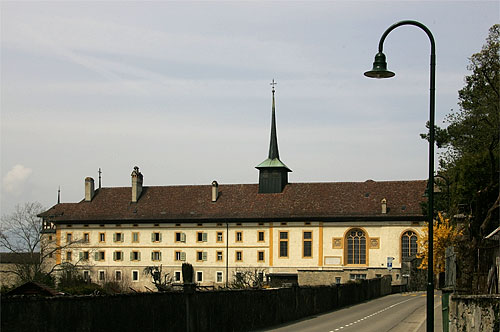
Convent of the Dominican

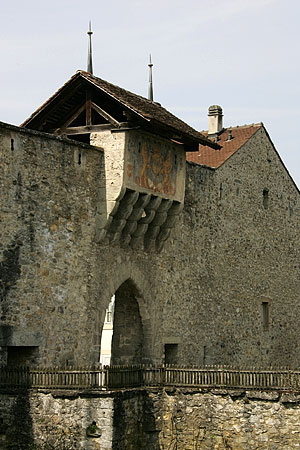
Fortifications

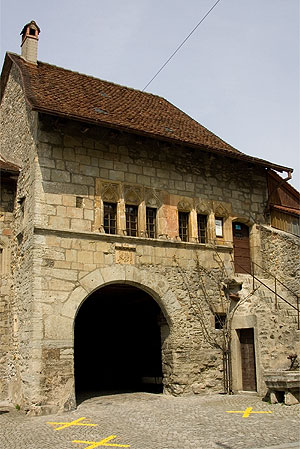
House de la Dîme

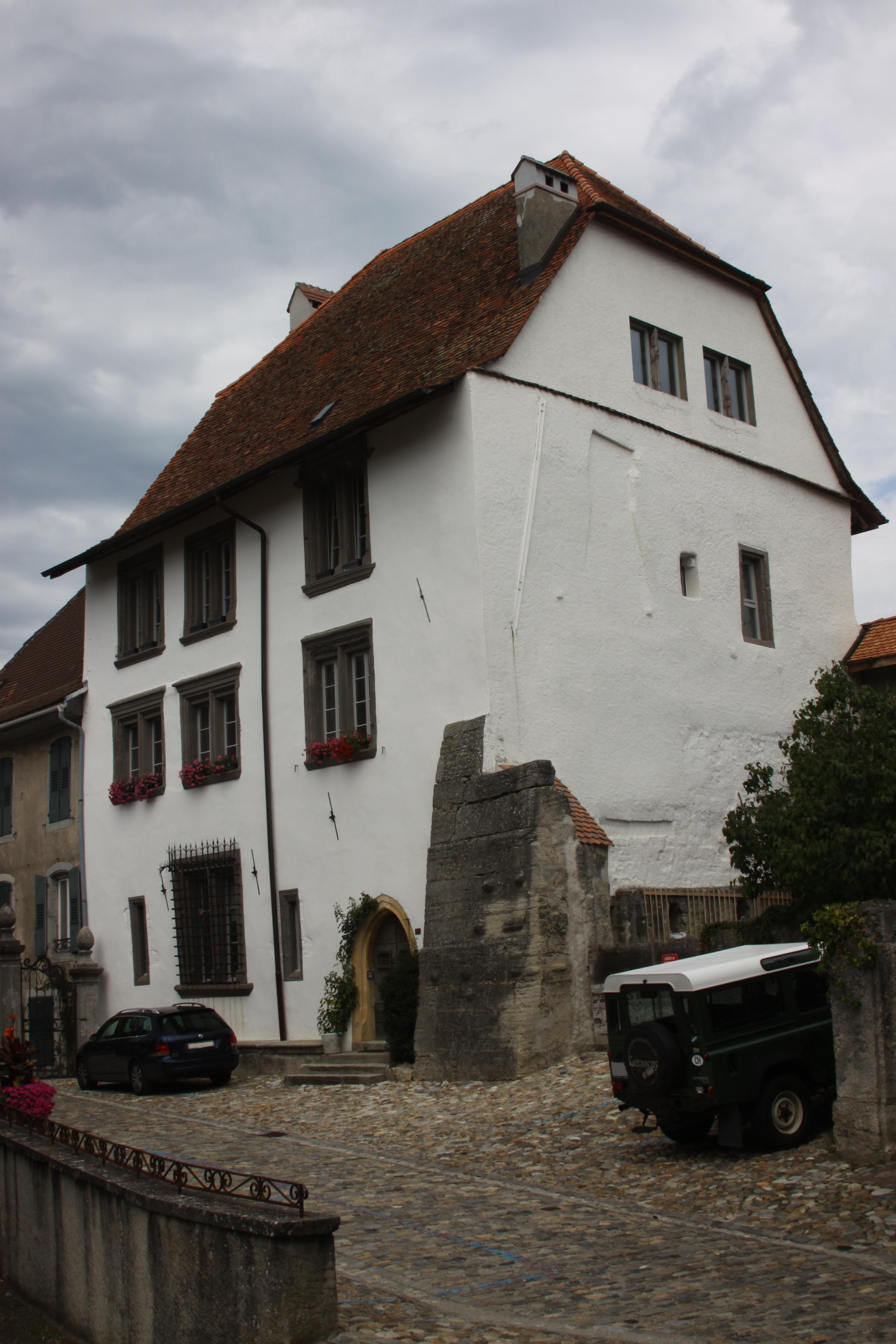
House des Sires d’Estavayer

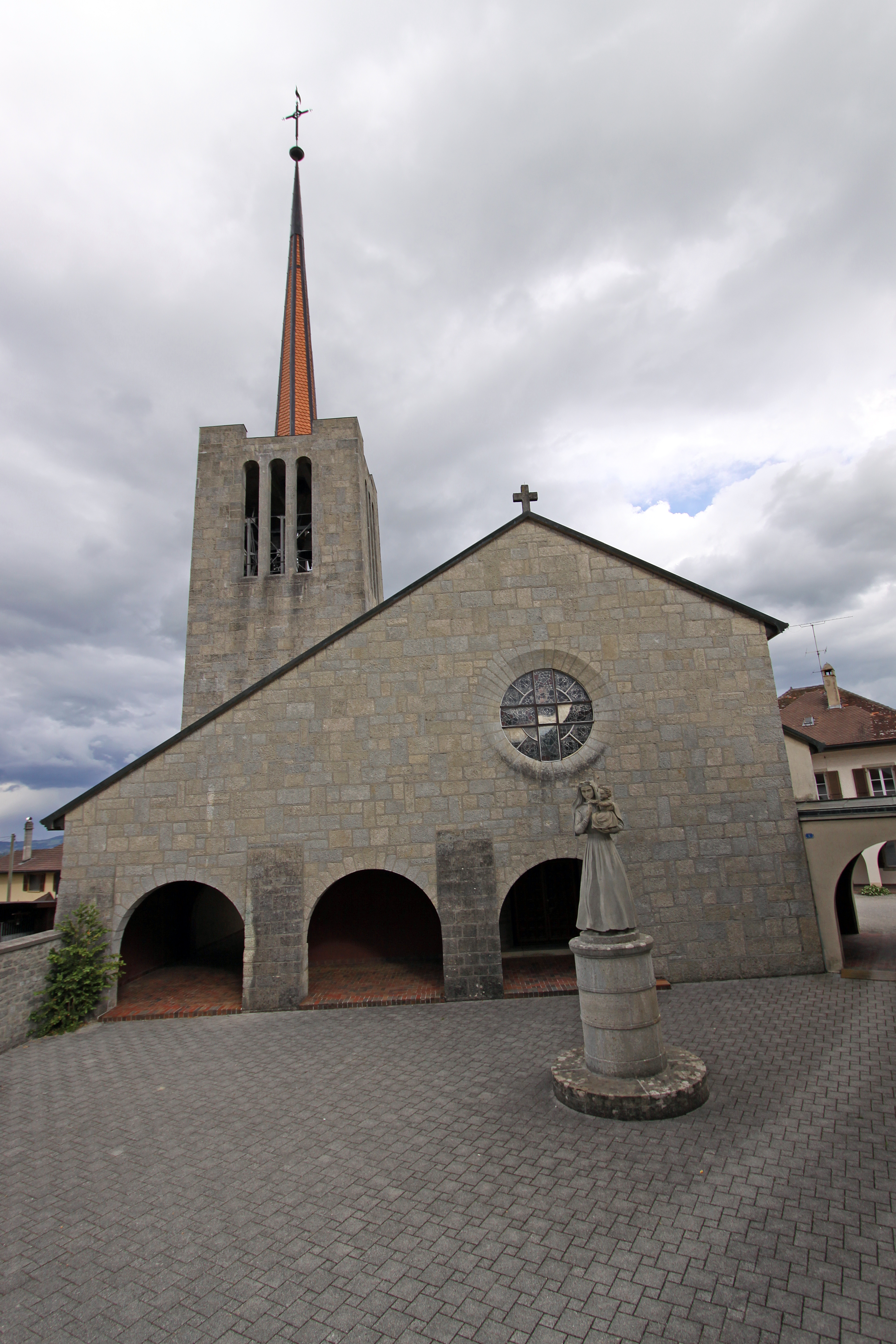
Church of Saint-Maurice

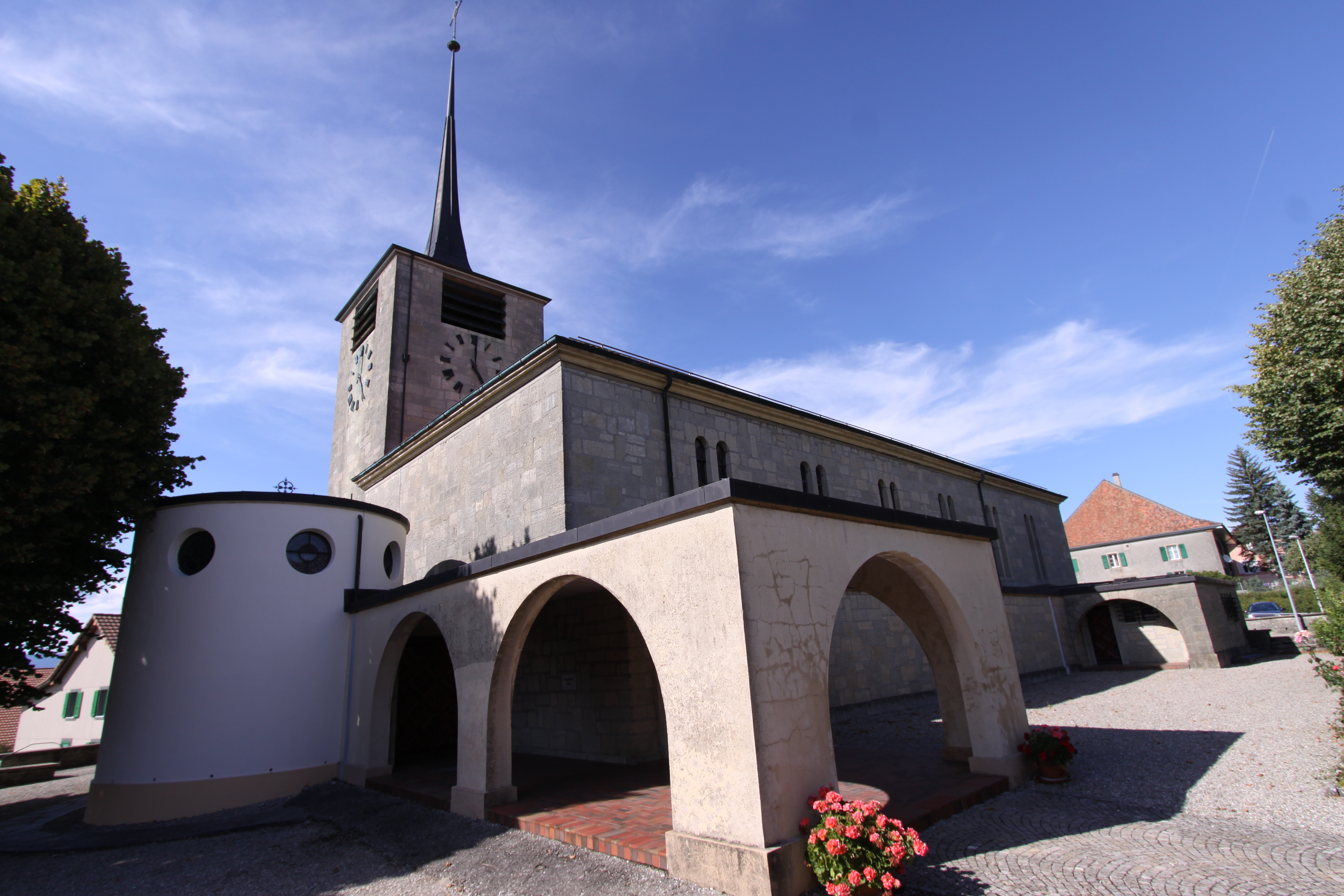
Saint-Pierre Church

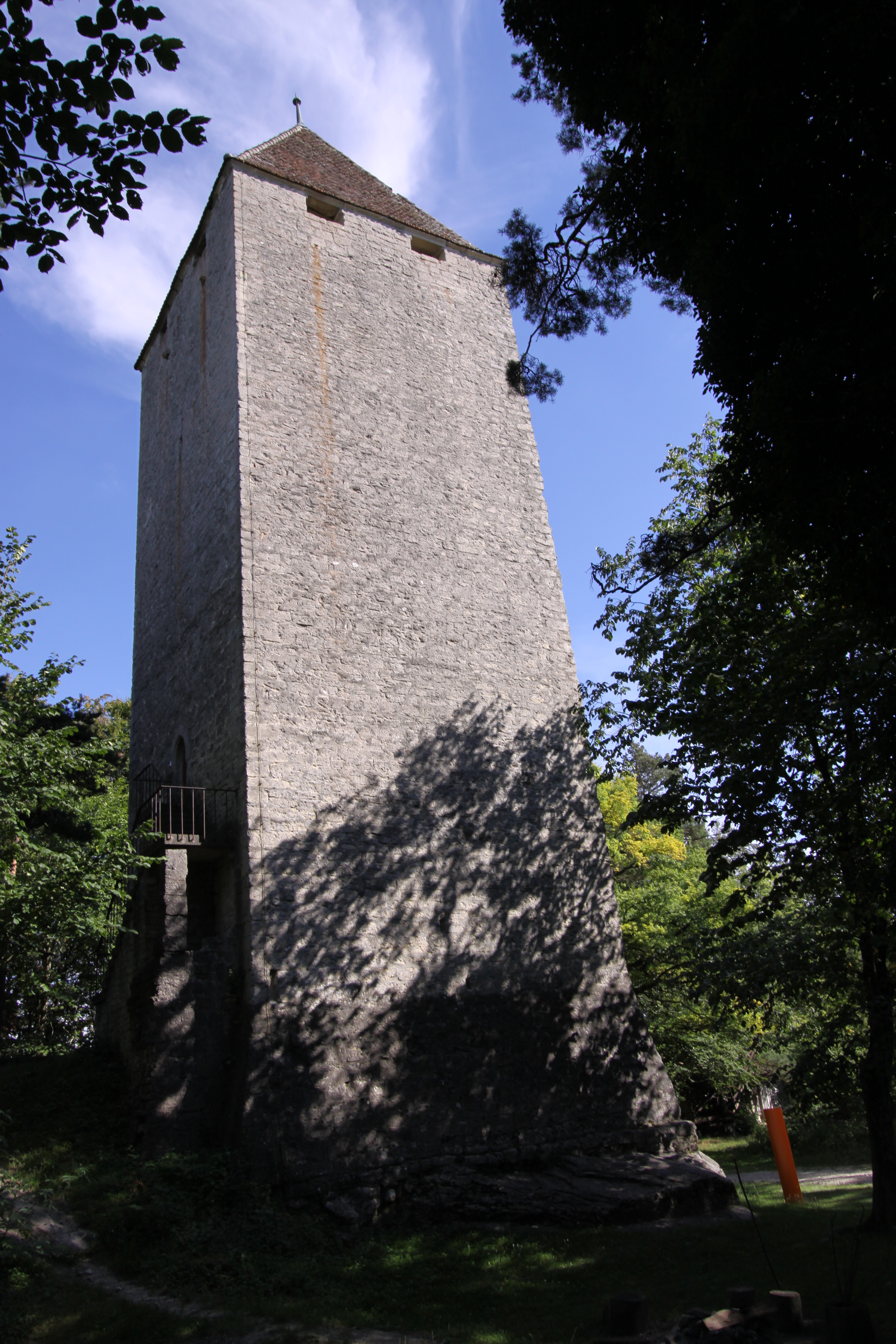
La Molière tower

== Transportation ==
The municipality has a railway station, Estavayer-le-Lac, on the Fribourg–Yverdon line. It has regular service to Fribourg/Freiburg and Yverdon-les-Bains.
