= Rueyres-les-Prés =

- Former municipality
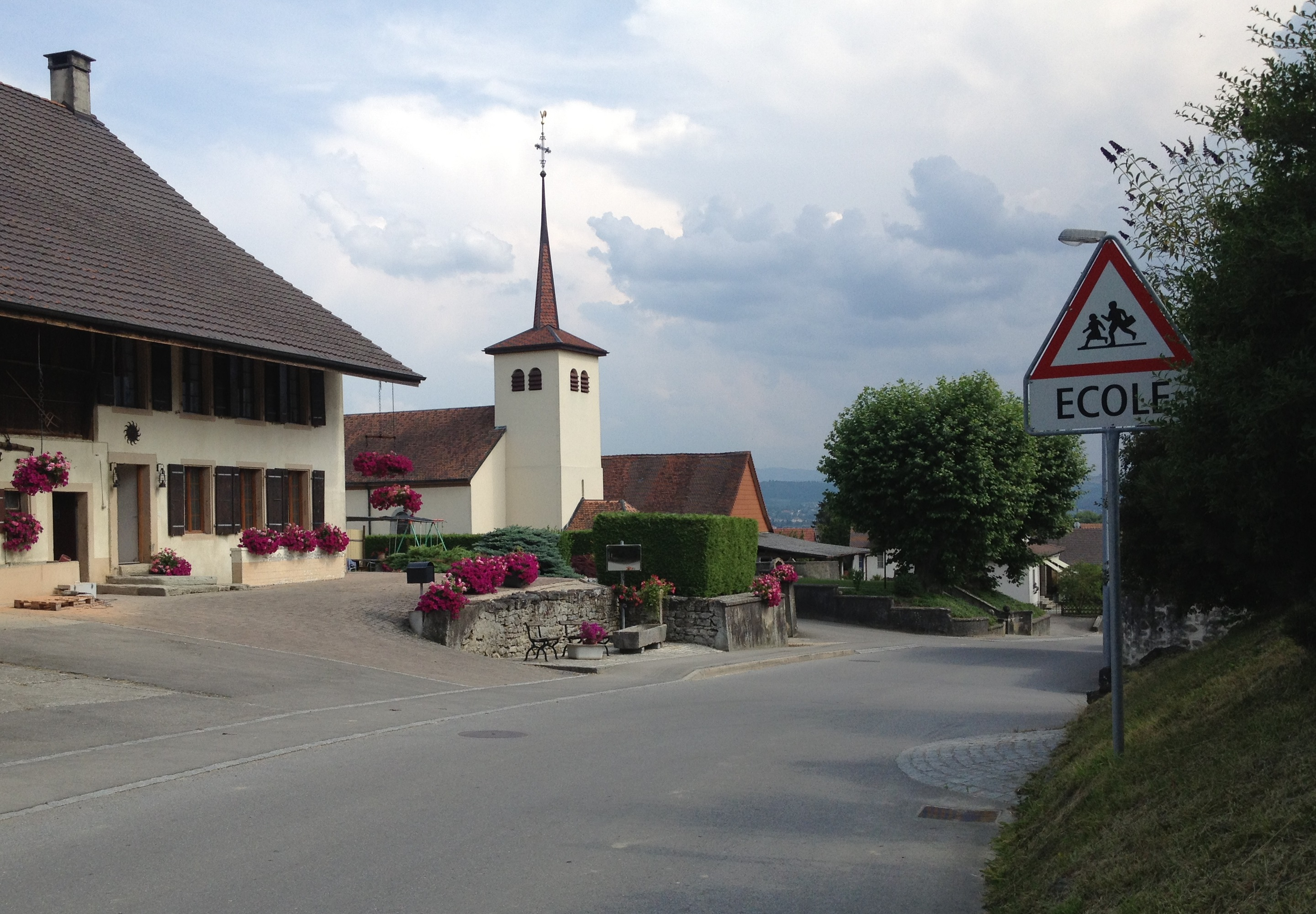

- Coat of arms
- Location of Rueyres-les-Prés
- Location within Switzerland Location within Canton of Fribourg
- Coordinates: 46°52′N 6°55′E
- Country: Switzerland
- Canton: Fribourg
- District: Broye

Government
  - Mayor: Syndic

Area
  - Total: 3.18 km^{2} (1.23 sq mi)
- Elevation: 473 m (1,552 ft)

Population (Dec 2015)
  - Total: 432
  - Density: 136/km^{2} (352/sq mi)
- Time zone: UTC+01:00 (CET)
  - Summer (DST): UTC+02:00 (CEST)
- Postal code: 1542
- SFOS number: 2039
- ISO 3166 code: CH-FR
- Surrounded by: Autavaux, Forel, Grandcour (VD), Montbrelloz, Morens, Payerne (VD)
- Website: rueyres-les-pres.ch

Rueyres-les-Prés (French pronunciation: [ʁɥɛʁ le pʁe]; Arpitan: Ruêres-les-Prâts [ˈʁɥɛr lɛ ˈpʁɑ]) is a former municipality in the district of Broye in the canton of Fribourg in Switzerland. On 1 January 2017 the former municipalities of Rueyres-les-Prés, Bussy, Estavayer-le-Lac, Morens, Murist, Vernay and Vuissens merged into the new municipality of Estavayer.

== History ==
Rueyres-les-Prés is first mentioned in 1288 as en Ruere.

== Geography ==
Rueyres-les-Prés had an area, as of 2009, of 3.2 square kilometers (1.2 mi^{2}). Of this area, 2.6 km^{2} (1.0 mi^{2}) or 82.0% is used for agricultural purposes, while 0.07 km^{2} (0.027 mi^{2}) or 2.2% is forested. Of the rest of the land, 0.46 km^{2} (0.18 mi^{2}) or 14.5% is settled (buildings or roads), 0.03 km^{2} (7.4 acres) or 0.9% is either rivers or lakes.

Of the built up area, housing and buildings made up 3.5% and transportation infrastructure made up 10.4%. Out of the forested land, all of the forested land area is covered with heavy forests. Of the agricultural land, 71.3% is used for growing crops and 10.1% is pastures. All the water in the municipality is flowing water.

The former municipality is located in the Broye district, on the slopes above the left side of the lower Broye valley.

== Coat of arms ==
The blazon of the municipal coat of arms is Azure, a Lion rampant Argent langued Gules and armed Or.

== Demographics ==
Rueyres-les-Prés had a population (as of 2015) of 432. As of 2008, 8.0% of the population are resident foreign nationals. Over the last 10 years (2000–2010) the population has changed at a rate of 30.1%. Migration accounted for 25.2%, while births and deaths accounted for 2.4%.

Most of the population (as of 2000) speaks French (231 or 98.3%) as their first language, German is the second most common (3 or 1.3%) and Portuguese is the third (1 or 0.4%).

As of 2008, the population was 50.3% male and 49.7% female. The population was made up of 143 Swiss men (45.5% of the population) and 15 (4.8%) non-Swiss men. There were 146 Swiss women (46.5%) and 10 (3.2%) non-Swiss women. Of the population in the municipality, 91 or about 38.7% were born in Rueyres-les-Prés and lived there in 2000. There were 76 or 32.3% who were born in the same canton, while 56 or 23.8% were born somewhere else in Switzerland, and 12 or 5.1% were born outside of Switzerland.

The age distribution, as of 2000, in Rueyres-les-Prés is; 36 children or 15.3% of the population are between 0 and 9 years old and 28 teenagers or 11.9% are between 10 and 19. Of the adult population, 18 people or 7.7% of the population are between 20 and 29 years old. 43 people or 18.3% are between 30 and 39, 35 people or 14.9% are between 40 and 49, and 41 people or 17.4% are between 50 and 59. The senior population distribution is 16 people or 6.8% of the population are between 60 and 69 years old, 10 people or 4.3% are between 70 and 79, there are 7 people or 3.0% who are between 80 and 89, and there is 1 person who is 90 and older.

As of 2000, there were 103 people who were single and never married in the municipality. There were 115 married individuals, 14 widows or widowers and 3 individuals who are divorced.

As of 2000, there were 88 private households in the municipality, and an average of 2.6 persons per household. There were 24 households that consist of only one person and 7 households with five or more people. In 2000, a total of 85 apartments (89.5% of the total) were permanently occupied, while 6 apartments (6.3%) were seasonally occupied and 4 apartments (4.2%) were empty. As of 2009, the construction rate of new housing units was 6.3 new units per 1000 residents.

The historical population is given in the following chart:

== Politics ==
In the 2011 federal election the most popular party was the SVP which received 29.1% of the vote. The next three most popular parties were the CVP (28.9%), the SP (18.9%) and the FDP (10.8%).

The SVP lost about 5.6% of the vote when compared to the 2007 Federal election (34.7% in 2007 vs 29.1% in 2011). The CVP gained popularity (22.2% in 2007), the SPS retained about the same popularity (17.3% in 2007) and the FDP retained about the same popularity (11.1% in 2007). A total of 142 votes were cast in this election, of which 2 or 1.4% were invalid.

== Economy ==
As of 2010, Rueyres-les-Prés had an unemployment rate of 2.5%. As of 2008, there were 23 people employed in the primary economic sector and about 11 businesses involved in this sector. 8 people were employed in the secondary sector and there was 1 business in this sector. 19 people were employed in the tertiary sector, with 6 businesses in this sector. There were 121 residents of the municipality who were employed in some capacity, of which females made up 33.9% of the workforce.

In 2008 the total number of full-time equivalent jobs was 41. The number of jobs in the primary sector was 18, all of which were in agriculture. The number of jobs in the secondary sector was 8, all of which were in construction. The number of jobs in the tertiary sector was 15. In the tertiary sector; 4 or 26.7% were in wholesale or retail sales or the repair of motor vehicles, 1 was in the movement and storage of goods, 9 or 60.0% were in a hotel or restaurant, 1 was in education.

In 2000, there were 6 workers who commuted into the municipality and 92 workers who commuted away. The municipality is a net exporter of workers, with about 15.3 workers leaving the municipality for every one entering. Of the working population, 3.3% used public transportation to get to work, and 71.9% used a private car.

== Religion ==
From the 2000 census, 190 or 80.9% were Roman Catholic, while 27 or 11.5% belonged to the Swiss Reformed Church. Of the rest of the population, there were 8 individuals (or about 3.40% of the population) who belonged to another Christian church. 14 (or about 5.96% of the population) belonged to no church, are agnostic or atheist.

== Education ==
In Rueyres-les-Prés about 106 or (45.1%) of the population have completed non-mandatory upper secondary education, and 14 or (6.0%) have completed additional higher education (either university or a Fachhochschule). Of the 14 who completed tertiary schooling, 71.4% were Swiss men, 21.4% were Swiss women.

The Canton of Fribourg school system provides one year of non-obligatory Kindergarten, followed by six years of Primary school. This is followed by three years of obligatory lower Secondary school where the students are separated according to ability and aptitude. Following the lower Secondary students may attend a three or four year optional upper Secondary school. The upper Secondary school is divided into gymnasium (university preparatory) and vocational programs. After they finish the upper Secondary program, students may choose to attend a Tertiary school or continue their apprenticeship.

During the 2010–11 school year, there were a total of 18 students attending one class in Rueyres-les-Prés. A total of 53 students from the municipality attended any school, either in the municipality or outside of it. There were no kindergarten classes in the municipality, but 3 students attended kindergarten in a neighboring municipality. The municipality had one primary class and 18 students. During the same year, there were no lower secondary classes in the municipality, but 14 students attended lower secondary school in a neighboring municipality. There were no upper Secondary classes or vocational classes, but there were 13 upper Secondary vocational students who attended classes in another municipality. The municipality had no non-university Tertiary classes, but there were 3 non-university Tertiary students who attended classes in another municipality.

As of 2000, there were 11 students in Rueyres-les-Prés who came from another municipality, while 34 residents attended schools outside the municipality.
