= Autavaux =

Former municipality, canton of Fribourg

- Former municipality
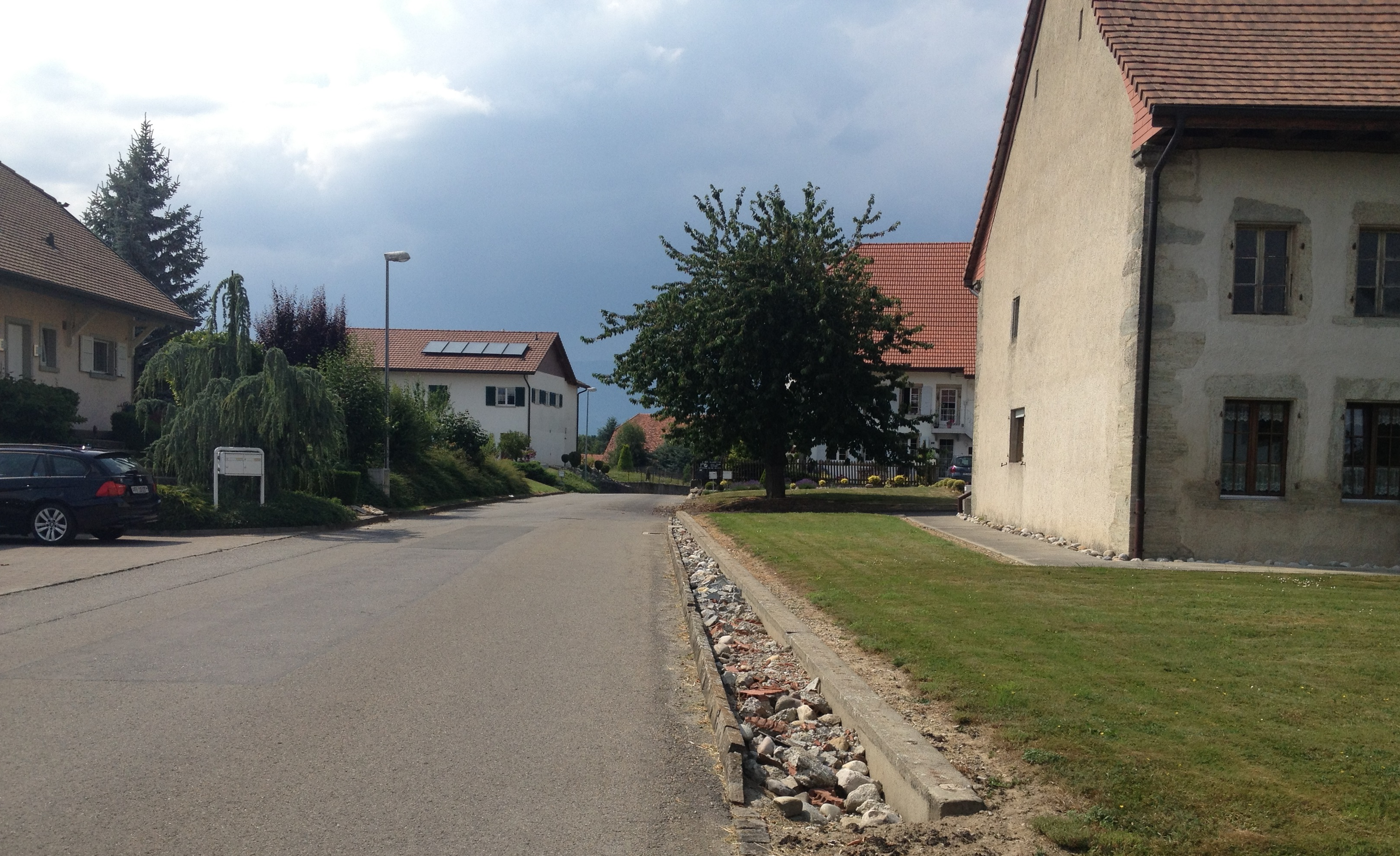
- Autavaux

- Coat of arms
- Location of Autavaux
- Location within Switzerland Location within Canton of Fribourg
- Coordinates: 46.865278°N 6.877222°E
- Country: Switzerland
- Canton: Fribourg
- District: Broye
- Municipality: Estavayer

Population (2000)
  - Total: 201
- Time zone: UTC+01:00 (CET)
  - Summer (DST): UTC+02:00 (CEST)
- ISO 3166 code: CH-FR
- Website

Autavaux is a former municipality in the Broye district of the canton of Fribourg, Switzerland, on the south shore of Lake Neuchâtel. From 2006 to 2016 it formed the municipality of Vernay with Forel and Montbrelloz, and since 2017 it has been part of the municipality of Estavayer.

== History ==
Autavaux is first mentioned in 1350 as Autavauz. Two lakeside sites have been known since the 19th century, one from the Neolithic and a second, more important one from the Bronze Age. Finds from the latter, called La Crasaz II, include bronze pieces from a two-wheeled chariot imported from Tuscany or Latium.

In 1350 the village belonged to the lordship of Estavayer; in 1504 the members of the commune acknowledged themselves subjects of Philippe d'Estavayer. From 1536 Autavaux belonged to the bailiwick of Estavayer, and from 1798 to 1848 to the district of Estavayer. In 1505 François de Treytorrens sold the tithe to the clergy of Estavayer, subject to the right of redemption. Two-thirds of the inhabitants belonged to the parish of Estavayer; the others were parishioners of Morens, then from the early 17th century of Montet (Broye), and finally, from 1719, of Estavayer. In 1907 Autavaux was joined to the parish of Montbrelloz; it then belonged to the rectorate of Forel-Autavaux, created in 1909 and made a parish in 1942.

Autavaux is a rural village, with cereal and fodder crops and cattle breeding. Land consolidation took place from 1972 to 1986. The village had 87 inhabitants in 1811, 120 in 1850, 139 in 1900, 136 in 1950 and 201 in 2000. From 2006 to 2016 Autavaux formed the municipality of Vernay with Forel and Montbrelloz; since 2017 it has been part of Estavayer.

== Bibliography ==
- J.Ph. Grangier, Annales d'Estavayer, 1905, 282–284
- La Liberté, 10–26 April 1909
- C. Buchiller, "Quelques considérations sur la 'poignée de char étrusque' d'Autavaux FR", in Archäologie der Schweiz, 15, 1992, 74–79
