= Boudry =

- Municipality
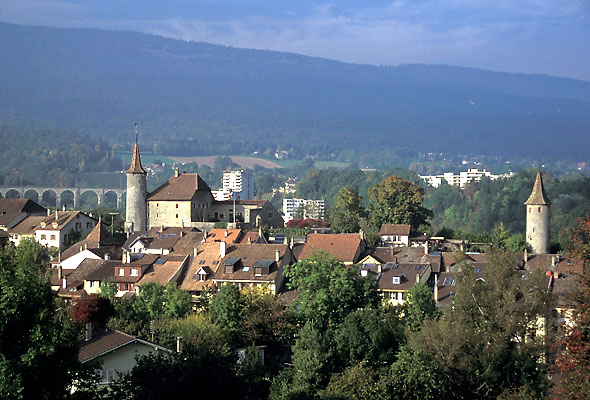

- Coat of arms
- Location of Boudry
- Location within Switzerland Location within Canton of Neuchâtel
- Coordinates: 46°57′N 6°50′E
- Country: Switzerland
- Canton: Neuchâtel

Area
  - Total: 16.78 km^{2} (6.48 sq mi)
- Elevation: 460 m (1,510 ft)

Population (December 2003)
  - Total: 5,056
  - Density: 301.3/km^{2} (780.4/sq mi)
- Time zone: UTC+01:00 (CET)
  - Summer (DST): UTC+02:00 (CEST)
- Postal code: 2017
- SFOS number: 6404
- ISO 3166 code: CH-NE
- Surrounded by: Chevroux (VD), Cortaillod, Delley-Portalban (FR), Gletterens (FR), La Grande Béroche, Milvignes, Neuchâtel, Rochefort, Val-de-Travers
- Twin towns: Voujeaucourt (France)
- Website: www.boudry.ch

Boudry is a municipality in the canton of Neuchâtel in Switzerland.

== History ==
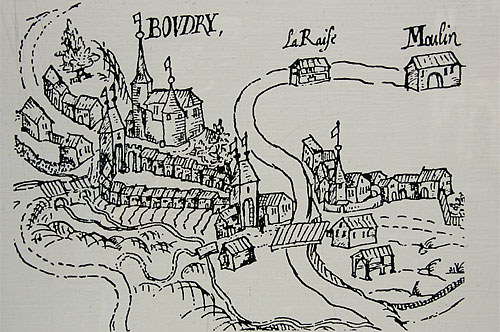
Map of Boudry

Aerial view (1962)

Boudry is first mentioned in 1278 as Baudri.

There are numerous prehistoric settlements around Boudry. These include the Neolithic stilt houses on the banks of Lake Neuchâtel, the caves of Abri Baume du Four (occupied from the Neolithic to the La Tène period), tumuli of the Hallstatt period in the Vallon de Vers and two Celtic villages at Les Buchilles. There a number of Roman era artifacts and a Burgundian cemetery at Bel-Air by the Areuse river.

During the Middle Ages it was the capital of the seigneurie of Boudry. Until the 14th Century, the hamlets of Pontareuse and Vermondins were part of the seigneurie. Pontareuse was near the bridge, with which the Roman road of Vy d'Etraz crossed the Areuse, while Vermondins was on a plateau near the modern city of Boudry. In 1282, Pierre de Vaumarcus sold the jurisdiction rights to Girard d'Estavayer. In 1313, his son Rollin sold these rights to count Rudolph IV of Neuchâtel. Two years before, Rudolph IV had seized the Bailiwick of Areuse from Pierre d'Estavayer. Boudry Castle was probably built before 1278 by the Counts of Neuchâtel. So the purchase in 1313 united both of these lands together with the castle lands under the Counts of Neuchâtel.

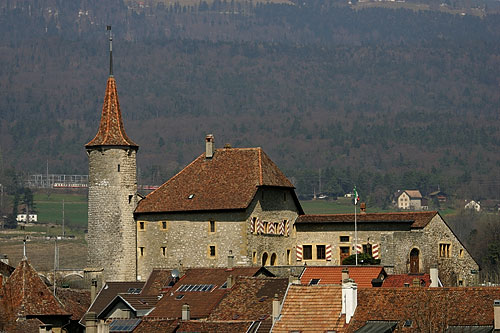
Boudry Castle

The castle was often given as a feudal landholding to daughters or wives of the House of Neuchâtel. On 12 September 1343, Count Louis granted the town a charter modeled after the laws of the city of Neuchatel, albeit with some limitations. In 1369 they acquired the right to collect the Ungeld or excise tax in the towns of Boudry and Cortaillod. In 1373, Marguerite de Vufflens, the widow of Louis of Neuchâtel, was given the office of Castellan in Boudry. However, the stormy relationship between the citizens and the family caused Isabella of Neuchâtel to give the office to her mother-in-law in 1379. The castellan office in Boudry was temporarily held by Girard of Neuchatel, the Lord of Vaumarcus, between 1394 and 1413. Then it went to the Counts of Neuchatel. The castellan had jurisdiction over both Boudry, the nearby priory of Bevaix and part of Bôle. The court had 14 judges and was chaired by the governor or his castellan. Before 1832, the civil courts of Rochefort, Bevaix and Cortaillod were all under Boudry. The civil courts were dissolved in 1832 and the three towns were all brought directly under the court of Boudry.

During the Middle Ages, the parish church of Boudry was located in Pontareuse, north of the town. At that time the parish comprised a part of Cortaillod, Boudry, Bôle, Rochefort and Brot and stretched, in the north, to the border with the County of Burgundy. The right of présentation (the ability to present a candidate for an office, who could only be rejected if his appointment would break a law) was held by the cathedral chapter of Lausanne. During the Protestant Reformation in 1534, the parish priest, Claude Gauthier, kept Boudry Roman Catholic while the surrounding parishes converted to the Reformed faith. The church at Pontareuse then became a shared church and thus served both denominations for several years. The remains of this church were still visible in 1815, but have since vanished. At the beginning of the 17th Century the inhabitants of Rochefort and Bôle both had a deacon who specially supervised their churches. In 1645–47, a Reformed church was built in the center of town. The Reformed parish included only the inhabitants of the town. In 1832 the parish was absorbed by Areuse.

The municipal community of Boudry gained a number of rights in the 16th century. In 1510 they were allowed to build a town hall and in 1513 they built a mill. In 1523, the community received permission to lease their communal lands, followed in 1526, by the right to build houses outside the walls. Starting in 1540, they were allowed to appoint two mayors who administered the municipal lands. They were allowed to build a clock tower in 1548. Through various purchases the community acquired considerable rights in Champ-du-Moulin. The maintenance of the walls, the gates of the bridge and the town hall was paid from a fund which was managed by Boudry and Cortaillod together. The funds came from a special tax (Eminem de la porte), which was only paid by the inhabitants of Cortaillod. This tax led to a number of conflicts between the two communities until its abolition in 1813. In the course of the 18th century, the membership in the municipal community became closed. Only members of the citizen or the permanent resident (the so-called bourgeois non-communities) classes were allowed to join the municipal community, were not granted.

Boudry became the district capital in 1848.

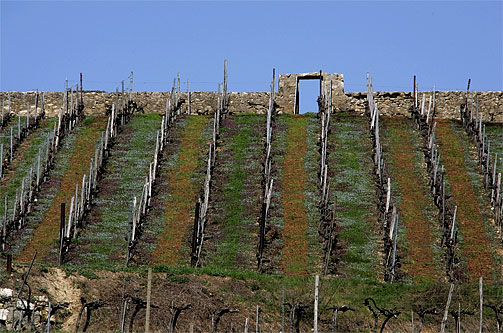
Vineyards outside Boudry

In the 18th Century Boudry became industrialized with the founding of three factories; Vauvilliers (from before 1742 until 1874), Les Iles (1727–1844) and Grand Champ (1761–1841). The factory buildings were later used by various industries, for example, the Vauvilliers factory building became a straw hat factory. A watch factory in Boudry was replaced in 1944 by a battery factory. In 1958, a large machine tool factory opened in the town. Other businesses in Boudry included the publishing house La Baconnière, which peaked during the Second World War. In Perreux, a Federal hospital for the chronically ill opened in 1894, which was later converted into a psychiatric hospital. Agriculture and viticulture flourish around the town. There are several wineries with their own wine cellars, a wine tasting cellar (1980) and a wine museum (1986).

== Geography ==
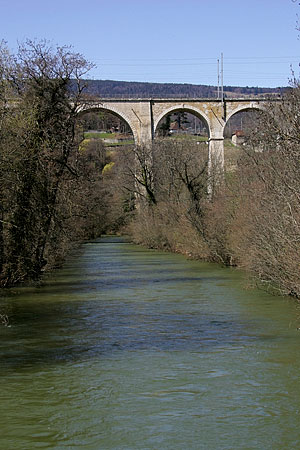
Railroad bridge across the Areuse near Boudry

Boudry has an area, as of 2009, of 16.8 square kilometers (6.5 mi^{2}). Of this area, 3.86 km^{2} (1.49 mi^{2}) or 23.0% is used for agricultural purposes, while 10.63 km^{2} (4.10 mi^{2}) or 63.4% is forested. Of the rest of the land, 2.01 km^{2} (0.78 mi^{2}) or 12.0% is settled (buildings or roads), 0.15 km^{2} (37 acres) or 0.9% is either rivers or lakes and 0.09 km^{2} (22 acres) or 0.5% is unproductive land.

Of the built up area, industrial buildings made up 1.4% of the total area while housing and buildings made up 5.5% and transportation infrastructure made up 3.6%. Out of the forested land, 62.2% of the total land area is heavily forested and 1.2% is covered with orchards or small clusters of trees. Of the agricultural land, 13.8% is used for growing crops and 4.2% is pastures, while 5.0% is used for orchards or vine crops. All the water in the municipality is flowing water.

The municipality was the capital of the Boudry district until the district level was eliminated on 1 January 2018. It consists of the small market town of Boudry on the heights above the Areuse and the settlements of Areuse, Trois-Rods and Perreux along with the settlement of Champ-du-Moulin in the Areuse canyon.

The proposed merger of the municipalities of Bevaix, Boudry and Cortaillod was rejected by the residents.

== Coat of arms ==
The blazon of the municipal coat of arms is Per fess or on a pale gules three chevrons argent and azure a fish naiant argent.

== Demographics ==
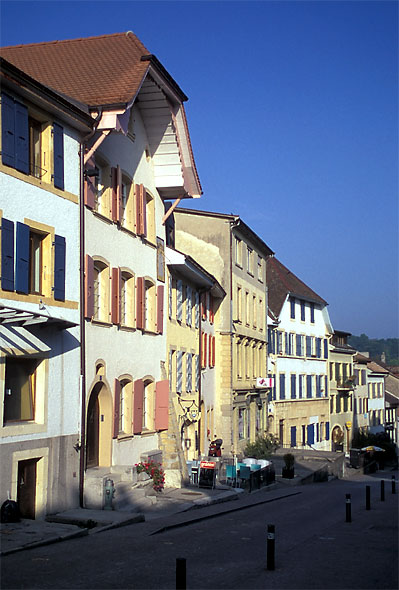
Houses in old Boudry

Boudry has a population (as of December 2020) of 6,193. As of 2008, 22.3% of the population are resident foreign nationals. Over the last 10 years (2000–2010 ) the population has changed at a rate of -3.3%. It has changed at a rate of -8.7% due to migration and at a rate of 3.3% due to births and deaths.

Most of the population (as of 2000) speaks French (4,593 or 86.5%) as their first language, German is the second most common (224 or 4.2%) and Italian is the third (159 or 3.0%).

As of 2008, the population was 48.5% male and 51.5% female. The population was made up of 1,794 Swiss men (36.0% of the population) and 625 (12.5%) non-Swiss men. There were 2,072 Swiss women (41.5%) and 496 (9.9%) non-Swiss women. Of the population in the municipality, 1,149 or about 21.6% were born in Boudry and lived there in 2000. There were 1,656 or 31.2% who were born in the same canton, while 1,054 or 19.8% were born somewhere else in Switzerland, and 1,169 or 22.0% were born outside of Switzerland.

As of 2000, children and teenagers (0–19 years old) make up 24% of the population, while adults (20–64 years old) make up 63.1% and seniors (over 64 years old) make up 12.9%.

As of 2000, there were 2,224 people who were single and never married in the municipality. There were 2,481 married individuals, 262 widows or widowers and 344 individuals who are divorced.

As of 2000, there were 2,156 private households in the municipality, and an average of 2.3 persons per household. There were 711 households that consist of only one person and 111 households with five or more people. In 2000, a total of 2,101 apartments (90.6% of the total) were permanently occupied, while 161 apartments (6.9%) were seasonally occupied and 58 apartments (2.5%) were empty. As of 2009, the construction rate of new housing units was 1.2 new units per 1000 residents. The vacancy rate for the municipality, in 2010, was 0.46%.

The historical population is given in the following chart:

== Heritage sites of national significance ==
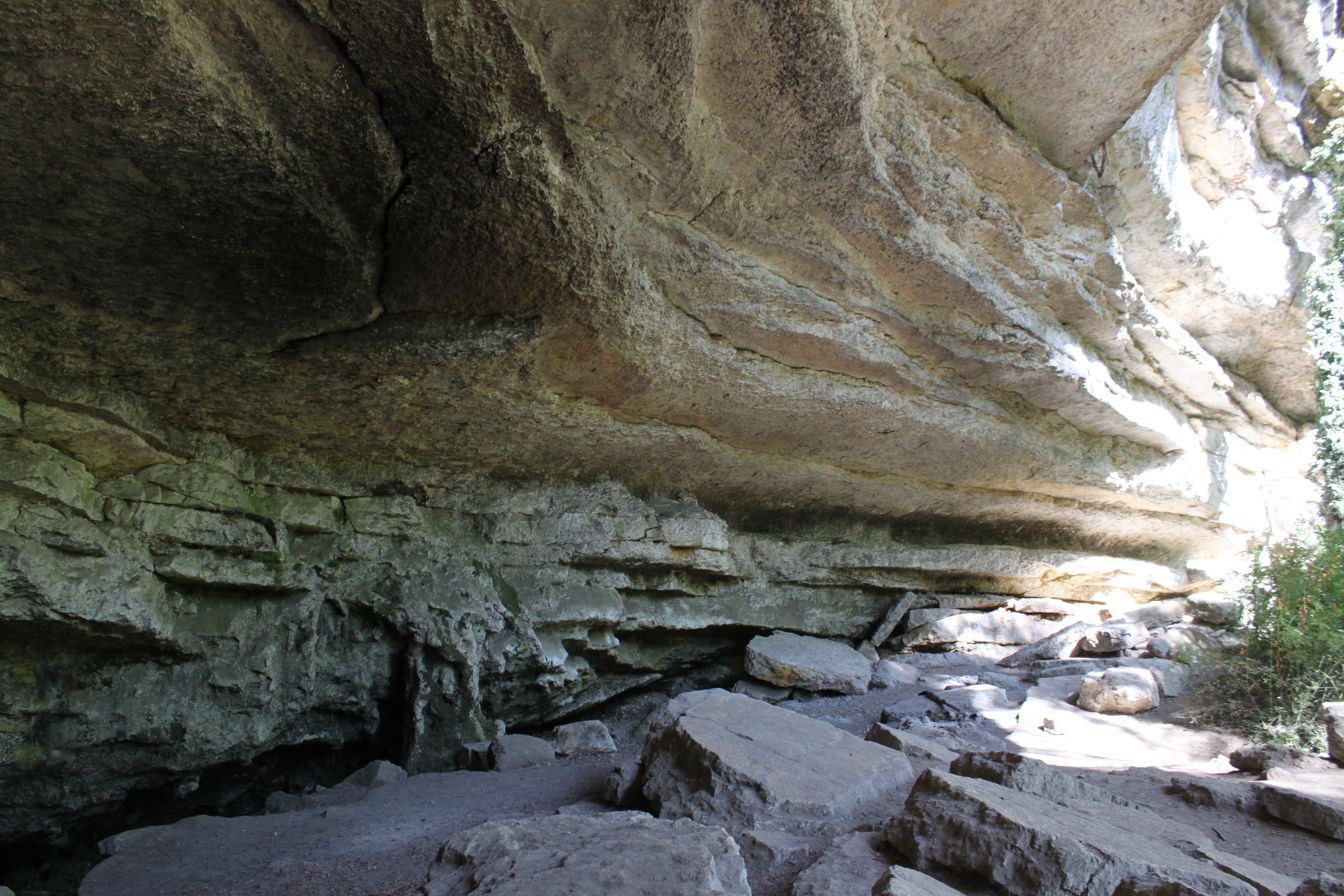
La Baume Du Four

The prehistoric settlement of La Baume Du Four is listed as a Swiss heritage site of national significance. The entire city of Boudry, and the Areuse, Grandchamp and Trois Rods areas are part of the Inventory of Swiss Heritage Sites.

== Politics ==
In the 2007 federal election the most popular party was the SP which received 26.12% of the vote. The next three most popular parties were the SVP (24.45%), the LPS Party (14.14%) and the FDP (11.99%). In the federal election, a total of 1,450 votes were cast, and the voter turnout was 46.6%.

== Economy ==
As of 2010, Boudry had an unemployment rate of 5.8%. As of 2008, there were 57 people employed in the primary economic sector and about 17 businesses involved in this sector. 1,230 people were employed in the secondary sector and there were 70 businesses in this sector. 1,572 people were employed in the tertiary sector, with 136 businesses in this sector. There were 2,714 residents of the municipality who were employed in some capacity, of which females made up 44.0% of the workforce.

In 2008 the total number of full-time equivalent jobs was 2,426. The number of jobs in the primary sector was 41, of which 36 were in agriculture and 5 were in forestry or lumber production. The number of jobs in the secondary sector was 1,159 of which 869 or (75.0%) were in manufacturing and 273 (23.6%) were in construction. The number of jobs in the tertiary sector was 1,226. In the tertiary sector; 224 or 18.3% were in wholesale or retail sales or the repair of motor vehicles, 77 or 6.3% were in the movement and storage of goods, 34 or 2.8% were in a hotel or restaurant, 3 or 0.2% were in the information industry, 15 or 1.2% were the insurance or financial industry, 133 or 10.8% were technical professionals or scientists, 26 or 2.1% were in education and 460 or 37.5% were in health care.

In 2000, there were 1,626 workers who commuted into the municipality and 1,913 workers who commuted away. The municipality is a net exporter of workers, with about 1.2 workers leaving the municipality for every one entering. About 1.2% of the workforce coming into Boudry are coming from outside Switzerland. Of the working population, 18.4% used public transportation to get to work, and 63.7% used a private car.

== Religion ==
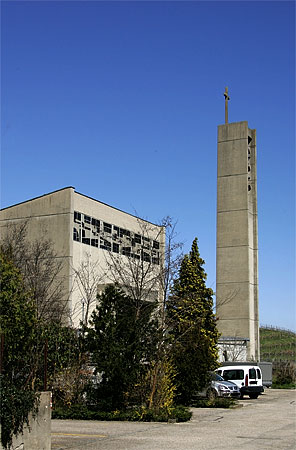
New catholic church in Boudry

From the 2000 census, 1,664 or 31.3% were Roman Catholic, while 2,102 or 39.6% belonged to the Swiss Reformed Church. Of the rest of the population, there were 21 members of an Orthodox church (or about 0.40% of the population), there were 12 individuals (or about 0.23% of the population) who belonged to the Christian Catholic Church, and there were 314 individuals (or about 5.91% of the population) who belonged to another Christian church. There were 7 individuals (or about 0.13% of the population) who were Jewish, and 77 (or about 1.45% of the population) who were Islamic. There were 3 individuals who were Buddhist and 6 individuals who belonged to another church. 1,026 (or about 19.32% of the population) belonged to no church, are agnostic or atheist, and 232 individuals (or about 4.37% of the population) did not answer the question.

== Education ==
In Boudry about 1,963 or (37.0%) of the population have completed non-mandatory upper secondary education, and 665 or (12.5%) have completed additional higher education (either university or a Fachhochschule). Of the 665 who completed tertiary schooling, 52.9% were Swiss men, 26.2% were Swiss women, 11.7% were non-Swiss men and 9.2% were non-Swiss women.

In the canton of Neuchâtel most municipalities provide two years of non-mandatory kindergarten, followed by five years of mandatory primary education. The next four years of mandatory secondary education is provided at thirteen larger secondary schools, which many students travel out of their home municipality to attend. During the 2010–11 school year, there were 5 kindergarten classes with a total of 100 students in Boudry. In the same year, there were 15 primary classes with a total of 282 students.

As of 2000, there were 66 students in Boudry who came from another municipality, while 416 residents attended schools outside the municipality.

== Notable people ==
- Jean-Paul Marat (1743 in Boudry – 1793) a French political theorist, physician, scientist, journalist and politician during the French Revolution.
- Philippe Suchard (1797 in Boudry – 1884) a Swiss chocolatier and industrialist, creator of Milka
- Pierre Bovet (1878 in Grandchamp - 1965 in Boudry) a Swiss psychologist and pedagogue
