= Montbrelloz =

Former municipality, canton of Fribourg

- Former municipality
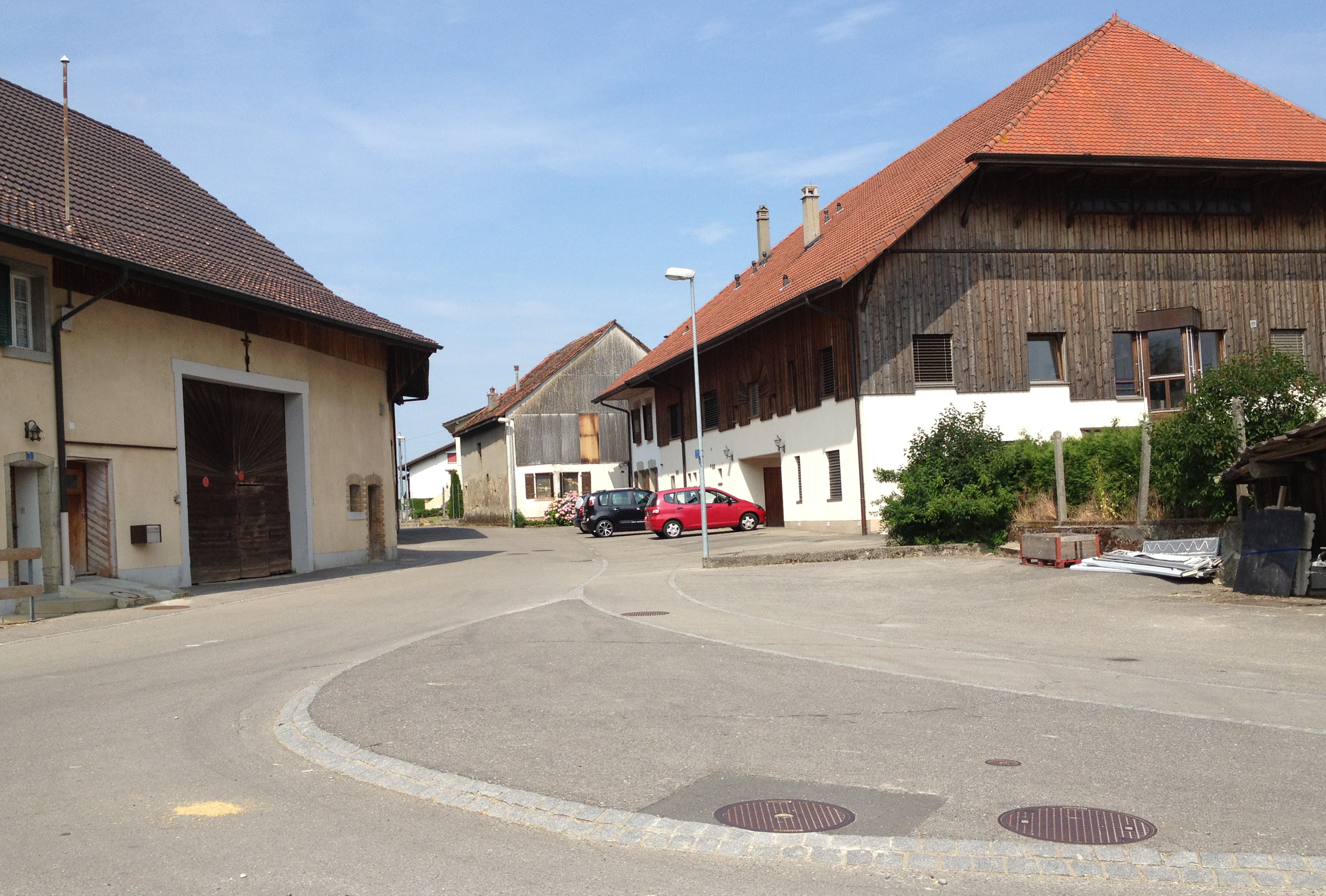
- Montbrelloz

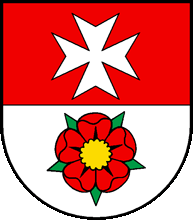
- Coat of arms
- Location of Montbrelloz
- Location within Switzerland Location within Canton of Fribourg
- Coordinates: 46.853611°N 6.886667°E
- Country: Switzerland
- Canton: Fribourg
- District: Broye
- Municipality: Estavayer

Population (2000)
  - Total: 268
- Time zone: UTC+01:00 (CET)
  - Summer (DST): UTC+02:00 (CEST)
- ISO 3166 code: CH-FR
- Website

Montbrelloz is a former municipality in the Broye district of the canton of Fribourg, Switzerland, in the enclave of Estavayer-le-Lac. From 2006 to 2016 it formed the municipality of Vernay with Autavaux and Forel, and since 2017 it has been part of the municipality of Estavayer.

== History ==
Montbrelloz is first mentioned in 1228 as Mons brenlos. Finds include a Neolithic axe blade and isolated Roman remains. In the 12th century the Hospitallers of Saint John of Jerusalem founded a priory there, which depended on the commandery of La Chaux (Cossonay) until 1536. The village was burned by the people of Payerne in 1338.

In the Middle Ages Montbrelloz belonged to the lordship of Estavayer; it was attached to the bailiwick of the same name (1536–1798) and then to the district of Estavayer-le-Lac (1798–1848). The parish, recorded in 1228 and served by the Hospitallers from 1322 to 1555, was incorporated into the chapter of Saint Nicholas in Fribourg in 1580; between 1909 and 1942 it included Autavaux. The former priory church, dedicated to Saint John the Baptist, is Romanesque; it was enlarged in the 13th century, altered in 1761, no longer used for worship, and restored in 1986. The parish church dates from 1965. There was a leper house in 1573.

The marshes were drained from 1828 to 1853, and land consolidation took place from 1941 to 1948. Montbrelloz had 153 inhabitants in 1811, 167 in 1850, 161 in 1900, 181 in 1950 and 268 in 2000. A rural locality (eight farms in 2000), it has been aiming at residential development since the opening of the A1 motorway in 2001. From 2006 to 2016 Montbrelloz formed the municipality of Vernay with Autavaux and Forel; since 2017 it has been part of Estavayer.

== Bibliography ==
- A. Dellion, Dictionnaire historique et statistique des paroisses catholiques du canton de Fribourg, 8, 469–483
- Almanach de la Broye, 1987, 55–59
- J. Bujard, "Montbrelloz", in Archéologie fribourgeoise, 1994, 77–80
