= Gletterens =

- Municipality
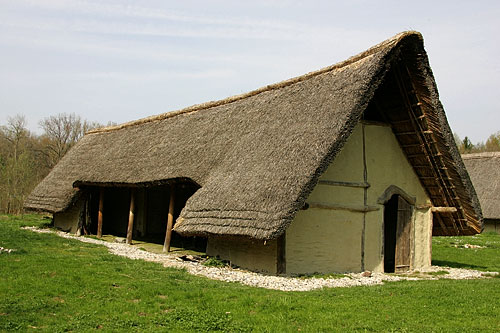
- Reconstruction of a prehistoric house in Gletterens

- Coat of arms
- Location of Gletterens
- Location within Switzerland Location within Canton of Fribourg
- Coordinates: 46°54′N 6°56′E
- Country: Switzerland
- Canton: Fribourg
- District: Broye

Government
  - Mayor: Syndic

Area
  - Total: 3.02 km^{2} (1.17 sq mi)
- Elevation: 486 m (1,594 ft)

Population (December 2020)
  - Total: 1,094
  - Density: 362/km^{2} (938/sq mi)
- Time zone: UTC+01:00 (CET)
  - Summer (DST): UTC+02:00 (CEST)
- Postal code: 1544
- SFOS number: 2022
- ISO 3166 code: CH-FR
- Surrounded by: Boudry (NE), Chevroux (VD), Cortaillod (NE), Delley-Portalban, Grandcour (VD), Vallon
- Website: gletterens.ch

Gletterens (French pronunciation: [ɡlɛtəʁɑ̃s]; Arpitan: Glléterens) is a municipality in the district of Broye, in the canton of Fribourg, Switzerland.

It is home to the Les Grèves prehistoric pile-dwelling (or stilt house) settlements that are part of the Prehistoric Pile dwellings around the Alps UNESCO World Heritage Site.

== History ==
Gletterens is first mentioned in 1239 as Lieterins.

== Geography ==
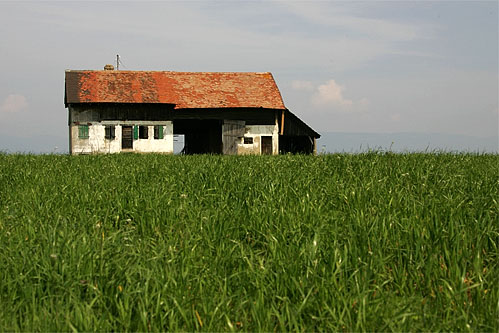
Abandoned farm house in fields outside Gletterens

Gletterens has an area, as of 2009, of 2.9 square kilometers (1.1 mi^{2}). Of this area, 1.51 km^{2} (0.58 mi^{2}) or 51.7% is used for agricultural purposes, while 0.47 km^{2} (0.18 mi^{2}) or 16.1% is forested. Of the rest of the land, 0.59 km^{2} (0.23 mi^{2}) or 20.2% is settled (buildings or roads) and 0.36 km^{2} (0.14 mi^{2}) or 12.3% is unproductive land.

Of the built up area, housing and buildings made up 12.0% and transportation infrastructure made up 2.7%. while parks, green belts and sports fields made up 5.1%. Out of the forested land, all of the forested land area is covered with heavy forests. Of the agricultural land, 41.8% is used for growing crops and 9.2% is pastures.

The municipality is located Broyebez., abseits der grossen Verkehrsachsen am Neuenburgersee gelegen.. It consists of the village of Gletterens and the hamlets of Broyebez., abseits der grossen Verkehrsachsen am Neuenburgersee gelegen..

== Coat of arms ==
The blazon of the municipal coat of arms is Barry of six Or and Gules and on a Chief Argent fimbriated wavy Azure a Rose Gules barbed and seeded proper in sinister.

== Demographics ==
Gletterens has a population (as of December 2020) of 1,094. As of 2008, 7.7% of the population are resident foreign nationals. Over the last 10 years (2000–2010) the population has changed at a rate of 50.7%. Migration accounted for 52.7%, while births and deaths accounted for 5.4%.

Most of the population (as of 2000) speaks French (385 or 71.8%) as their first language, German is the second most common (139 or 25.9%) and Italian is the third (5 or 0.9%).

As of 2008, the population was 48.3% male and 51.7% female. The population was made up of 332 Swiss men (44.1% of the population) and 31 (4.1%) non-Swiss men. There were 347 Swiss women (46.1%) and 42 (5.6%) non-Swiss women. Of the population in the municipality, 158 or about 29.5% were born in Gletterens and lived there in 2000. There were 94 or 17.5% who were born in the same canton, while 215 or 40.1% were born somewhere else in Switzerland, and 58 or 10.8% were born outside of Switzerland.

The age distribution, as of 2000, in Gletterens is; 63 children or 11.8% of the population are between 0 and 9 years old and 61 teenagers or 11.4% are between 10 and 19. Of the adult population, 45 people or 8.4% of the population are between 20 and 29 years old. 78 people or 14.6% are between 30 and 39, 93 people or 17.4% are between 40 and 49, and 70 people or 13.1% are between 50 and 59. The senior population distribution is 67 people or 12.5% of the population are between 60 and 69 years old, 32 people or 6.0% are between 70 and 79, there are 22 people or 4.1% who are between 80 and 89, and there are 5 people or 0.9% who are 90 and older.

As of 2000, there were 183 people who were single and never married in the municipality. There were 293 married individuals, 34 widows or widowers and 26 individuals who are divorced.

As of 2000, there were 171 private households in the municipality, and an average of 2.6 persons per household. There were 35 households that consist of only one person and 10 households with five or more people. In 2000, a total of 159 apartments (53.0% of the total) were permanently occupied, while 124 apartments (41.3%) were seasonally occupied and 17 apartments (5.7%) were empty. As of 2009, the construction rate of new housing units was 13.3 new units per 1000 residents. The vacancy rate for the municipality, in 2010, was 0.27%.

The historical population is given in the following chart:

== World Heritage Site ==
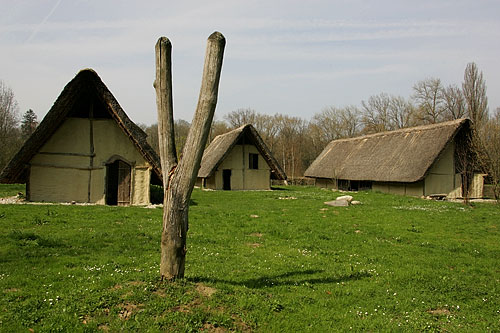
Aerchological stilt house museum

It is home to the Les Grèves prehistoric pile-dwelling (or stilt house) settlements that are part of the Prehistoric Pile dwellings around the Alps UNESCO World Heritage Site.

The Les Grèves site is located about 200 m (660 ft) from the present shoreline. Some of the timbers have been dendrochronologically dated to the 33rd century and the first half of the 32nd century BC. The site was well known locally before it was officially discovered by H. Schwab in the 1960s. The upper layers are from a Horgen culture settlement and the lower layers might be from either a Horgan or a Cortaillod culture settlement.

== Politics ==
In the 2011 federal election the most popular party was the SP which received 27.9% of the vote. The next three most popular parties were the SVP (27.4%), the CVP (14.4%) and the FDP (10.8%).

The SPS improved their position in Gletterens rising to first, from second in 2007 (with 33.2%) The SVP moved from first in 2007 (with 33.4%) to second in 2011, the CVP retained about the same popularity (12.7% in 2007) and the FDP retained about the same popularity (9.4% in 2007). A total of 289 votes were cast in this election, of which 3 or 1.0% were invalid.

== Economy ==
As of 2010, Gletterens had an unemployment rate of 3.5%. As of 2008, there were 17 people employed in the primary economic sector and about 7 businesses involved in this sector. 28 people were employed in the secondary sector and there were 7 businesses in this sector. 99 people were employed in the tertiary sector, with 18 businesses in this sector. There were 256 residents of the municipality who were employed in some capacity, of which females made up 45.3% of the workforce.

In 2008 the total number of full-time equivalent jobs was 103. The number of jobs in the primary sector was 11, all of which were in agriculture. The number of jobs in the secondary sector was 24 of which 6 or (25.0%) were in manufacturing and 18 (75.0%) were in construction. The number of jobs in the tertiary sector was 68. In the tertiary sector; 9 or 13.2% were in wholesale or retail sales or the repair of motor vehicles, 2 or 2.9% were in the movement and storage of goods, 3 or 4.4% were in a hotel or restaurant, 4 or 5.9% were technical professionals or scientists, 5 or 7.4% were in education and 35 or 51.5% were in health care.

In 2000, there were 57 workers who commuted into the municipality and 182 workers who commuted away. The municipality is a net exporter of workers, with about 3.2 workers leaving the municipality for every one entering. Of the working population, 7% used public transportation to get to work, and 72.3% used a private car.

== Religion ==
From the 2000 census, 264 or 49.3% were Roman Catholic, while 133 or 24.8% belonged to the Swiss Reformed Church. Of the rest of the population, there were 4 members of an Orthodox church (or about 0.75% of the population), there were 4 individuals (or about 0.75% of the population) who belonged to the Christian Catholic Church, and there were 8 individuals (or about 1.49% of the population) who belonged to another Christian church. There were 3 (or about 0.56% of the population) who were Islamic. There were 1 individual who belonged to another church. 97 (or about 18.10% of the population) belonged to no church, are agnostic or atheist, and 26 individuals (or about 4.85% of the population) did not answer the question.

== Education ==
In Gletterens about 185 or (34.5%) of the population have completed non-mandatory upper secondary education, and 62 or (11.6%) have completed additional higher education (either university or a Fachhochschule). Of the 62 who completed tertiary schooling, 59.7% were Swiss men, 35.5% were Swiss women.

The Canton of Fribourg school system provides one year of non-obligatory Kindergarten, followed by six years of Primary school. This is followed by three years of obligatory lower Secondary school where the students are separated according to ability and aptitude. Following the lower Secondary students may attend a three or four year optional upper Secondary school. The upper Secondary school is divided into gymnasium (university preparatory) and vocational programs. After they finish the upper Secondary program, students may choose to attend a Tertiary school or continue their apprenticeship.

During the 2010–11 school year, there were a total of 43 students attending 3 classes in Gletterens. A total of 95 students from the municipality attended any school, either in the municipality or outside of it. There was one kindergarten class with a total of 11 students in the municipality. The municipality had 2 primary classes and 32 students. During the same year, there were no lower secondary classes in the municipality, but 29 students attended lower secondary school in a neighboring municipality. There were no upper Secondary classes or vocational classes, but there were 7 upper Secondary vocational students who attended classes in another municipality. The municipality had no non-university Tertiary classes, but there were 2 non-university Tertiary students and 2 specialized Tertiary students who attended classes in another municipality.

As of 2000, there were 21 students in Gletterens who came from another municipality, while 52 residents attended schools outside the municipality.
