= Lake Neuchâtel =

Lake in Switzerland

- Lac de Neuchâtel (French); Lèc de Nôchâtél (Arpitan); Neuenburgersee (German)
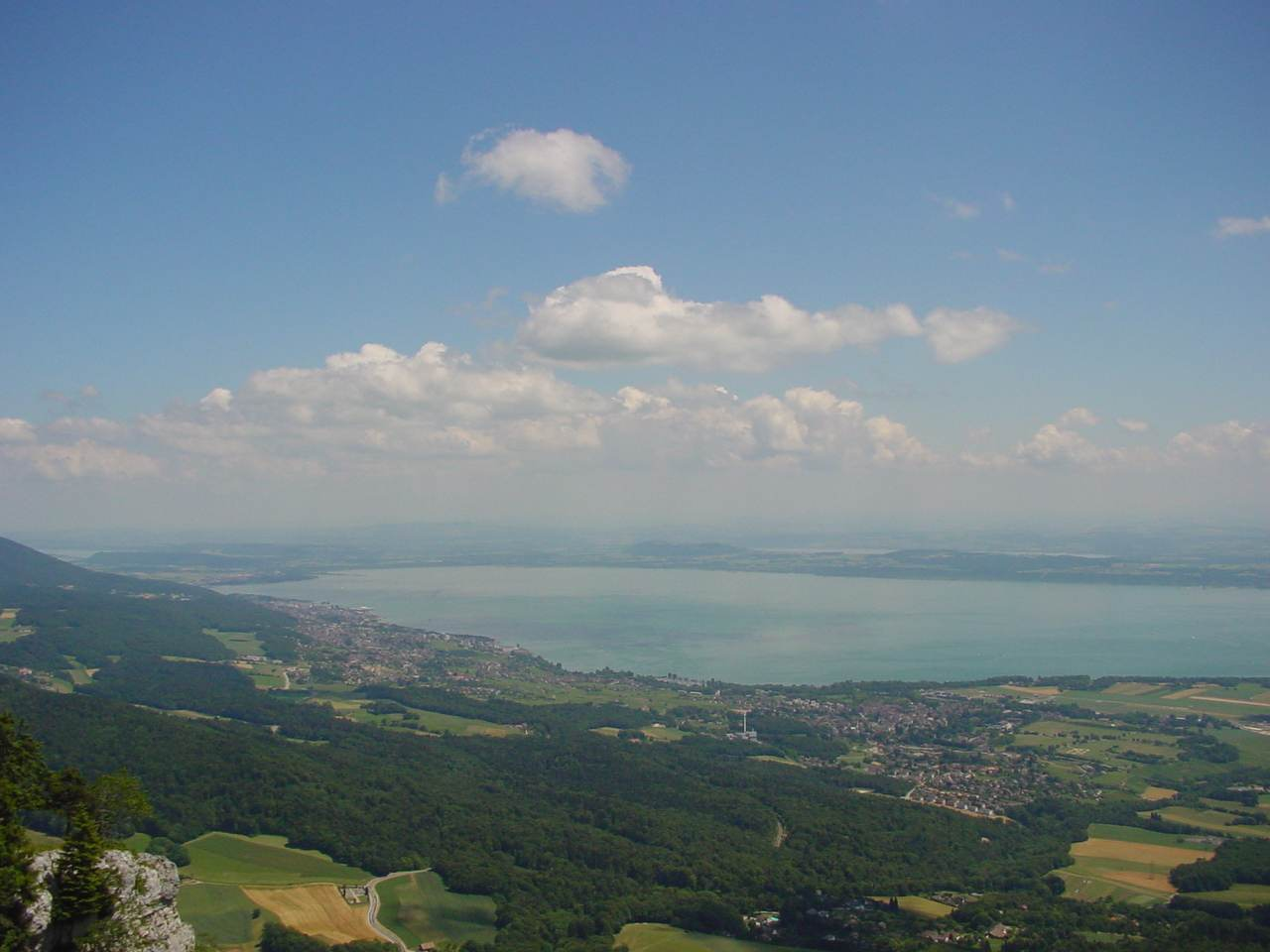
- With Lakes Biel and Morat in the background

- Location within Switzerland Location within Alps
- Interactive map of Lake Neuchâtel
- Coordinates: 46°54′N 6°51′E
- Primary inflows: L'Orbe (La Thielle), Le Bey, La Brine, L'Arnon, Ruisseau de la Vaux, Le Vivier, L'Areuse, Le Seyon; Canal Oriental, Le Buron, Ruisseau de l'Epena, La Menthue, Ruisseau de Crêt Moron, Ruisseau de Longefont, Ruisseau de Robin, Ruisseau de la Molliette, Canal de la Broye
- Primary outflows: Zihlkanal / Canal de la Thielle
- Catchment area: 2,670 km^{2} (1,030 sq mi)
- Basin countries: Switzerland
- Max. length: 38.3 km (23.8 mi)
- Max. width: 8.2 km (5.1 mi)
- Surface area: 218.3 km^{2} (84.3 sq mi)
- Average depth: 64.2 m (211 ft)
- Max. depth: 152 m (499 ft)
- Water volume: 13.77 km^{3} (11,160,000 acre⋅ft)
- Residence time: 8.2 years
- Surface elevation: 429 m (1,407 ft)
- Settlements: Neuchâtel, Grandson, Yverdon, Estavayer-le-Lac (see list)

Ramsar Wetland
- Official name: Rive sud du lac de Neuchâtel
- Designated: 9 November 1990
- Reference no.: 505

Lake Neuchâtel is a lake lying primarily in Romandy, the French-speaking part of Switzerland. The lake lies mainly in the canton of Neuchâtel, but is also shared by the cantons of Vaud, Fribourg, and Bern. It comprises one of the lakes in the Three Lakes Region (French: Pays des Trois-Lacs, German: Drei-Seen-Land), along with lakes Biel/Bienne and Morat/Murten.

With a surface of 218.3 km^{2} (84 sq mi), Lake Neuchâtel is the largest lake located entirely in Switzerland and the 59th largest lake in Europe. It is 38.3 km (23.8 mi) long and 8.2 km (5.1 mi) at its widest. Its surface is 429 metres (1,407 ft) above sea level, and the maximum depth is 152 metres (499 ft). The total water volume is 14.0 km^{3} (3.4 cu mi). The lake's drainage area is approximately 2,670 km^{2} (1,031 sq mi) and its culminating point is Le Chasseron at 1,607 metres (5,272 ft).

In comparison to the Lake Geneva region, the Lake Neuchatel shoreline has experienced significant economic development with the completion of the regional motorway network. It is also known to have housed a Celtic agglomeration on pile-dwellings called La Tène and which gives its name to the second Iron Age.

The lake is fed by the rivers L'Orbe (called La Thielle or La Thièle locally, downstream of the city of Orbe), L'Arnon, L'Areuse, Le Seyon, and La Menthue, as well as by the Canal de la Broye. The Thielle Canal (French: Canal de la Thielle, German: Zihlkanal) drains the lake into Lake Biel and is part of regulation system for the lakes and the rivers of the Seeland region.

Lake Neuchâtel was the home of the now extinct species of deepwater trout Salvelinus neocomensis.

== Geography ==
Lake Neuchatel is situated at the foot of the Jura mountain range, on the Swiss Plateau. Mainly in the French-speaking Swiss Romande, it borders the territory of four cantons: Neuchâtel (86 km^{2} (33 mi^{2})), Vaud (74 km^{2} (29 mi^{2})), Fribourg (53 km^{2} (20 mi^{2})) and Bern (2 km^{2} (0.77 mi^{2})).

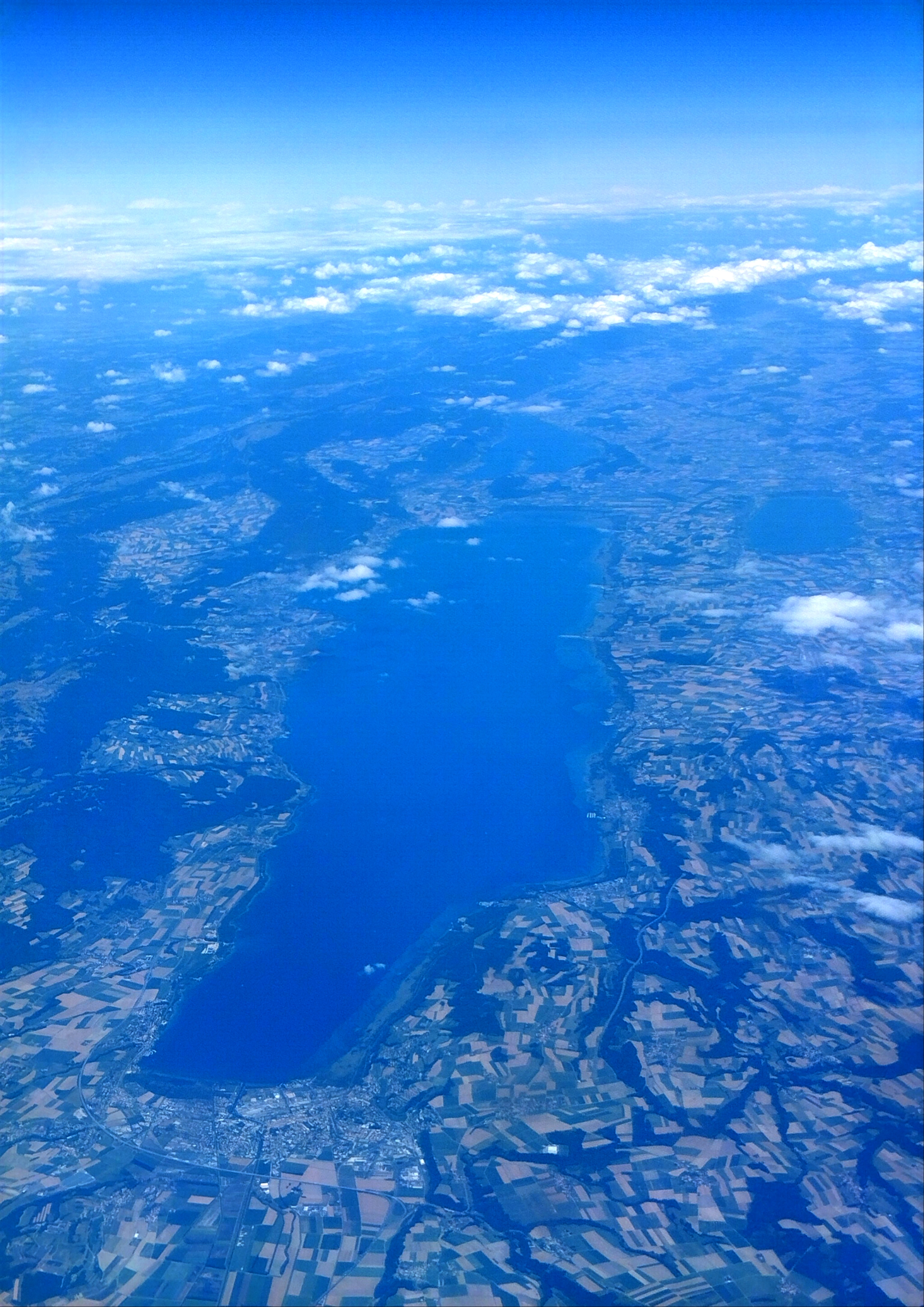
Lake Neuchâtel - July 25

The lake's main tributaries are the Thiele and the Broye canal which connect it to Lake Morat. It flows into Lake Biel via the Thielle canal (German: Zihlkanal).

Since the Jura water correction in the 19th and 20th centuries, it has served, together with Lake Morat, as a compensation basin for the waters of the Aare flowing into Lake Biel. Indeed, if the level of the latter rises too much, the flow may stop or even go in the opposite direction.

Lake Neuchâtel is 38 km (24 mi) long and has a maximum width of 8.2 km (5.1 mi). Its maximum depth is 152 m (499 ft) and its capacity is estimated at 14 km^{3} (3.4 mi^{3}). It is the largest lake located entirely on Swiss territory, considering that Lake Geneva and Lake Constance are shared with neighboring countries.

In the summer of 2021, Lake Neuchâtel reached historically high water levels due to widespread flooding over mainland Europe.

== History and prehistory ==
The lake was frequented by prehistoric man as evidenced by the remains (site of the Auvernier lake resort and archeological museum, the Laténium) where bones of brown bear and Eurasian beaver were also found (two species then almost ubiquitous in Europe). Several megalithic monuments line the lake such as the alignment of Clendy and the menhirs of Gorgier, Grandson, Saint-Aubin-Sauges, and Vauroux, as well as an imposing erratic block, the Stone of Marriage.

When the first Swiss towns appear, Mont Vully, which was a large fortified area of around 50 hectares built around 120 BCE, controlled the lakes of Morat and Neuchâtel while the La Tène area remained nearly unoccupied. What is now Yverdon-les-Bains was located on a barrier island on the other side of the lake, a place of smaller settlement (3 to 4 hectares) occupied from the 4th century BCE, and later fortified in 80 BCE by means of a long and solid rampart with frontal posts (like that of Vully), before this oppidum (Eburodunum) becomes a vicus in the first centuries CE.

The first written mention of the lake dates from the year 998 CE, where a laci everdunensis (or lake of Yverdon, from its Latin name Eburodunum) is mentioned, near which the priory of Bevaix was founded. The name dominates throughout the Middle Ages, co-utilized with the current term Lake Neuchâtel, however, is frequent from the 15th century onwards. The latter became dominant during the 19th century, in particular with the lowering of the level of the lake and the development of the Vaudois railway, which reduced the importance of the Port of Yverdon.

The Swiss Air Force used the lake for bombing practice until 2021, leaving an estimated 4,500 tons of munitions in its waters. Some of these munitions are located as close as six or seven meters below the surface.

Lake Neuchâtel, and in particular the town of Neuchâtel became a popular tourist destination during the Belle Époque period due to its climate and panoramic views of the Alps.

== List of settlements on the lake ==
=== Northwestern shore ===
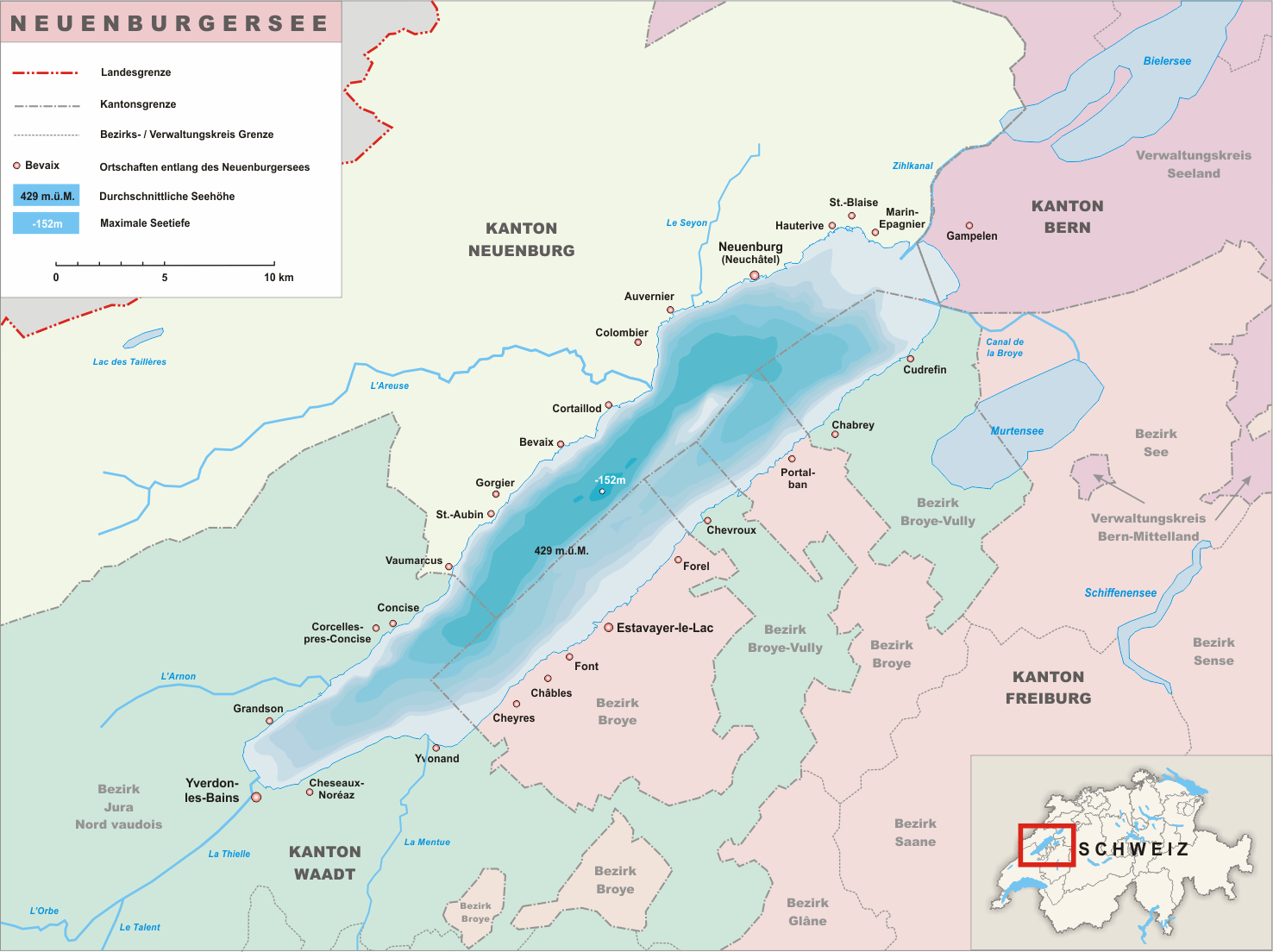
Cantonal participation of Lake Neuchâtel

From Yverdon to La Tène (Southwest to Northeast):

- Yverdon-les-Bains (VD)
- Grandson (VD)
- Bonvillars (VD)
- Onnens (VD)
- Corcelles-près-Concise (VD)
- Concise (VD)
- Vaumarcus (NE)
- Sauges (Saint-Aubin-Sauges) (NE)
- Saint-Aubin (Saint-Aubin-Sauges) (NE)
- Gorgier, Chez-Le-Bart (Gorgier) (NE)
- Bevaix (NE)
- Cortaillod (NE)
- Areuse (Boudry) (NE)
- Colombier (Milvignes) (NE)
- Auvernier (Milvignes) (NE)
- Serrières (Neuchâtel)
- Neuchâtel
- Hauterive (NE)
- St-Blaise (NE)
- Marin-Epagnier (La Tène) (NE)

=== Southeastern shore ===
From Yverdon to Gampelen:

- Cheseaux (Cheseaux-Noréaz) (VD)
- Yvonand (VD)
- Cheyres (Cheyres-Châbles) (FR)
- Châbles (Cheyres-Châbles) (FR)
- Font (Estavayer) (FR)
- Estavayer-le-Lac (Estavayer) (FR)
- Forel (Estavayer) (FR)
- Chevroux (VD)
- Pré de Riva (Gletterens) (FR)
- Portalban (Delley-Portalban) (FR)
- Chabrey (Vully-les-Lacs) (VD)
- Champmartin (Cudrefin) (VD)
- Cudrefin (VD)
- La Sauge (Cudrefin) (VD)
- Lindehof, Witzwil (Ins) (BE)
- Tannenhof (Gampelen) (BE)
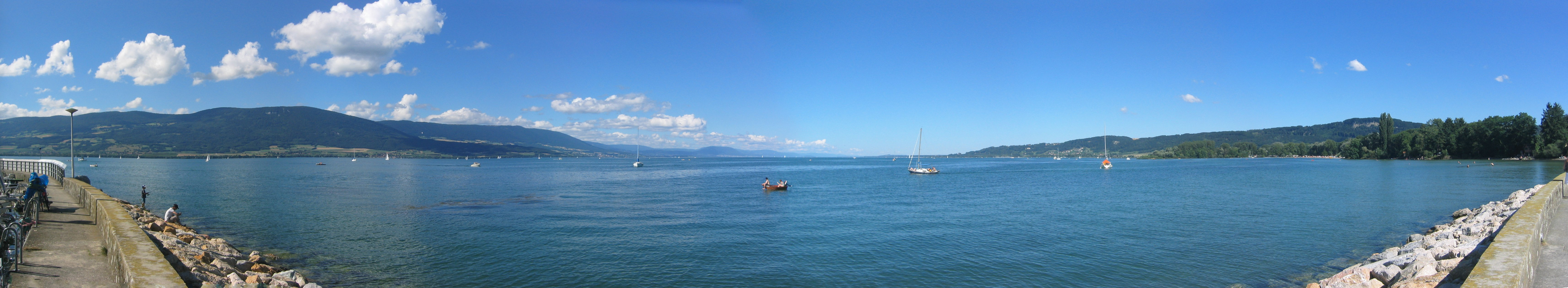
Panorama of Lake Neuchâtel
