= Grandcour =

- Municipality
- Flag Coat of arms
- Location of Grandcour
- Location within Switzerland Location within Canton of Vaud
- Coordinates: 46°52′N 6°56′E
- Country: Switzerland
- Canton: Vaud
- District: Broye-Vully

Government
  - Mayor: Syndic

Area
  - Total: 10.21 km^{2} (3.94 sq mi)
- Elevation: 484 m (1,588 ft)

Population (2003)
  - Total: 759
  - Density: 74.3/km^{2} (193/sq mi)
- Time zone: UTC+01:00 (CET)
  - Summer (DST): UTC+02:00 (CEST)
- Postal code: 1543
- SFOS number: 5817
- ISO 3166 code: CH-VD
- Surrounded by: Chevroux, Corcelles-près-Payerne, Forel (FR), Gletterens (FR), Payerne, Rueyres-les-Prés (FR), Vallon (FR)
- Website: www.grandcour.ch

Grandcour is a municipality in the district of Broye-Vully in the canton of Vaud in Switzerland.

== History ==
Grandcour is first mentioned in 1212 as apud grancort.

== Geography ==
Aerial view (1946)

Grandcour has an area, as of 2009, of 10.21 square kilometers (3.94 sq mi). Of this area, 8.06 km^{2} (3.11 sq mi) or 78.9% is used for agricultural purposes, while 1.47 km^{2} (0.57 sq mi) or 14.4% is forested. Of the rest of the land, 0.69 km^{2} (0.27 sq mi) or 6.8% is settled (buildings or roads), 0.01 km^{2} (2.5 acres) or 0.1% is either rivers or lakes.

Of the built up area, housing and buildings made up 3.4% and transportation infrastructure made up 2.9%. Out of the forested land, all of the forested land area is covered with heavy forests. Of the agricultural land, 69.3% is used for growing crops and 8.5% is pastures, while 1.1% is used for orchards or vine crops. All the water in the municipality is flowing water.

The municipality was part of the Payerne District until it was dissolved on 31 August 2006, and Grandcour became part of the new district of Broye-Vully.

The municipality is located in the Payerne district, Umfasst das Dorf G. und die Weiler Ressudens und Chesard; Vernay ist im 15. Jh. verschwunden.. It consists of the village of Grandcour and the hamlets of Bez. Payerne. Umfasst das Dorf G. und die Weiler Ressudens und Chesard; Vernay ist im 15. Jh. verschwunden..

== Coat of arms ==
The blazon of the municipal coat of arms is Pally of Six Argent and Azure, in second Pale in chief a Mullet of Five pierced Or; overall on a Bend Gules three Escallops bendwise Or.

== Demographics ==
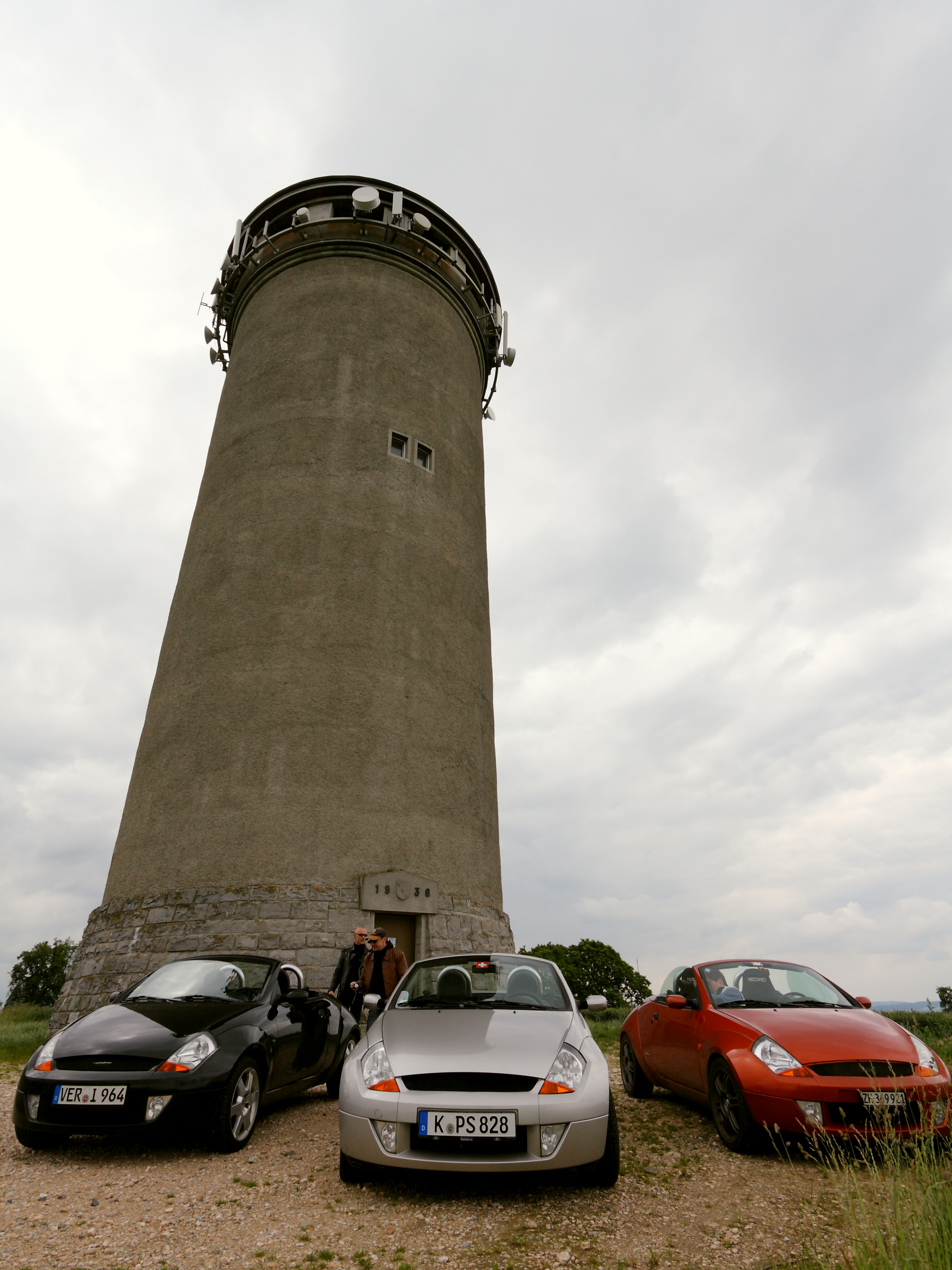
Grandcour water tower

Grandcour has a population (as of December 2020) of 967. As of 2008, 4.3% of the population are resident foreign nationals. Over the last 10 years (1999–2009 ) the population has changed at a rate of 4.5%. It has changed at a rate of 2.8% due to migration and at a rate of 2% due to births and deaths.

Most of the population (as of 2000) speaks French (680 or 93.2%), with German being second most common (30 or 4.1%) and Portuguese being third (13 or 1.8%). There are 5 people who speak Italian.

Of the population in the municipality 355 or about 48.6% were born in Grandcour and lived there in 2000. There were 172 or 23.6% who were born in the same canton, while 118 or 16.2% were born somewhere else in Switzerland, and 53 or 7.3% were born outside of Switzerland.

In 2008 there were 7 live births to Swiss citizens and 1 birth to non-Swiss citizens, and in same time span there were 11 deaths of Swiss citizens. Ignoring immigration and emigration, the population of Swiss citizens decreased by 4 while the foreign population increased by 1. There was 1 Swiss man who emigrated from Switzerland and 1 Swiss woman who immigrated back to Switzerland. At the same time, there was 1 non-Swiss man who immigrated from another country to Switzerland and 1 non-Swiss woman who emigrated from Switzerland to another country. The total Swiss population change in 2008 (from all sources, including moves across municipal borders) was a decrease of 7 and the non-Swiss population decreased by 3 people. This represents a population growth rate of -1.3%.

The age distribution, as of 2009, in Grandcour is; 82 children or 10.5% of the population are between 0 and 9 years old and 114 teenagers or 14.6% are between 10 and 19. Of the adult population, 84 people or 10.8% of the population are between 20 and 29 years old. 117 people or 15.0% are between 30 and 39, 113 people or 14.5% are between 40 and 49, and 85 people or 10.9% are between 50 and 59. The senior population distribution is 96 people or 12.3% of the population are between 60 and 69 years old, 56 people or 7.2% are between 70 and 79, there are 28 people or 3.6% who are between 80 and 89, and there are 6 people or 0.8% who are 90 and older.

As of 2000, there were 283 people who were single and never married in the municipality. There were 377 married individuals, 51 widows or widowers and 19 individuals who are divorced.

As of 2000, there were 296 private households in the municipality, and an average of 2.4 persons per household. There were 90 households that consist of only one person and 25 households with five or more people. Out of a total of 300 households that answered this question, 30.0% were households made up of just one person and there were 5 adults who lived with their parents. Of the rest of the households, there are 76 married couples without children, 113 married couples with children There were 9 single parents with a child or children. There were 3 households that were made up of unrelated people and 4 households that were made up of some sort of institution or another collective housing.

In 2000 there were 123 single family homes (or 54.7% of the total) out of a total of 225 inhabited buildings. There were 34 multi-family buildings (15.1%), along with 59 multi-purpose buildings that were mostly used for housing (26.2%) and 9 other use buildings (commercial or industrial) that also had some housing (4.0%). Of the single family homes 46 were built before 1919, while 9 were built between 1990 and 2000. The most multi-family homes (12) were built before 1919 and the next most (7) were built between 1991 and 1995.

In 2000 there were 326 apartments in the municipality. The most common apartment size was 4 rooms of which there were 88. There were 8 single room apartments and 108 apartments with five or more rooms. Of these apartments, a total of 282 apartments (86.5% of the total) were permanently occupied, while 31 apartments (9.5%) were seasonally occupied and 13 apartments (4.0%) were empty. As of 2009, the construction rate of new housing units was 2.6 new units per 1000 residents. The vacancy rate for the municipality, in 2010, was 0.58%.

The historical population is given in the following chart:

== Heritage sites of national significance ==
Grandcour Castle and the Swiss Reformed Church of Notre-Dame de Ressudens are listed as Swiss heritage site of national significance. The entire village of Grandcour is part of the Inventory of Swiss Heritage Sites.

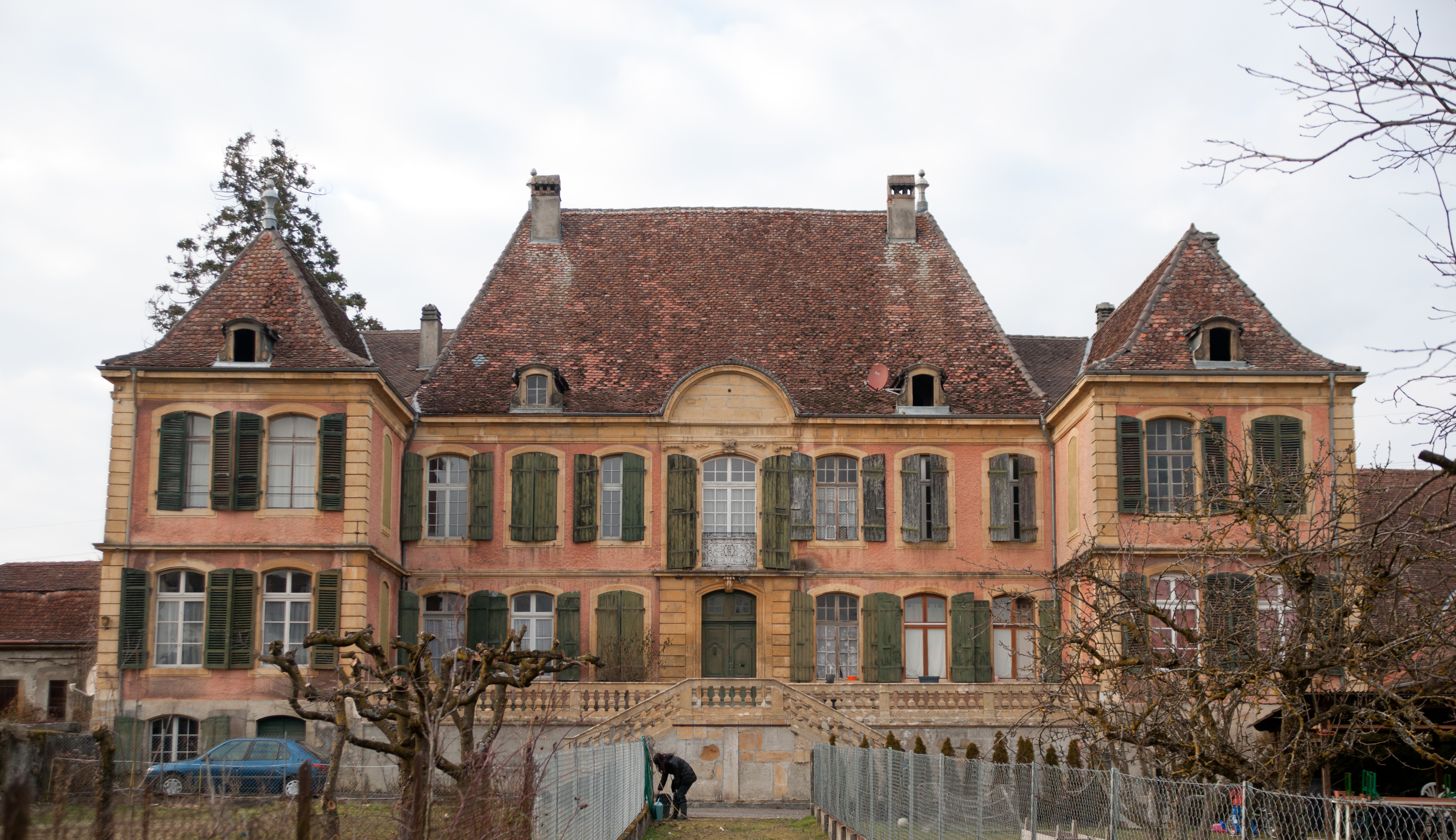
Grancour Castle

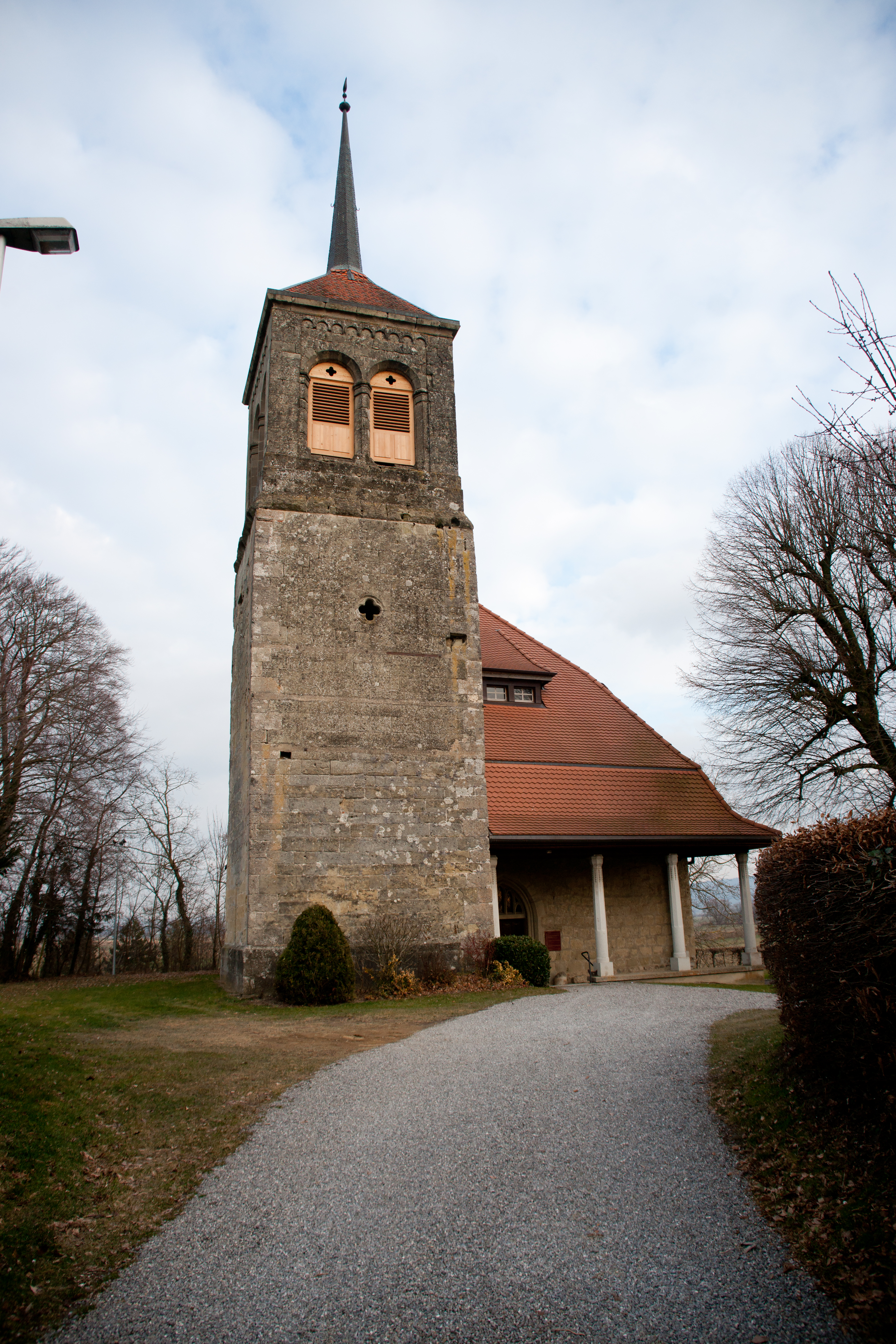

== Politics ==
In the 2007 federal election the most popular party was the SVP which received 33.35% of the vote. The next three most popular parties were the FDP (21.58%), the SP (14.58%) and the LPS Party (8.86%). In the federal election, a total of 264 votes were cast, and the voter turnout was 46.6%.

== Economy ==
As of 2010, Grandcour had an unemployment rate of 2.6%. As of 2008, there were 92 people employed in the primary economic sector and about 34 businesses involved in this sector. 36 people were employed in the secondary sector and there were 11 businesses in this sector. 87 people were employed in the tertiary sector, with 17 businesses in this sector. There were 383 residents of the municipality who were employed in some capacity, of which females made up 41.0% of the workforce.

In 2008 the total number of full-time equivalent jobs was 164. The number of jobs in the primary sector was 56, all of which were in agriculture. The number of jobs in the secondary sector was 32 of which 12 or (37.5%) were in manufacturing and 20 (62.5%) were in construction. The number of jobs in the tertiary sector was 76. In the tertiary sector; 50 or 65.8% were in wholesale or retail sales or the repair of motor vehicles, 1 was in the movement and storage of goods, 1 was in a hotel or restaurant, 12 or 15.8% were in the information industry, 1 was the insurance or financial industry, 7 or 9.2% were in education.

In 2000, there were 40 workers who commuted into the municipality and 242 workers who commuted away. The municipality is a net exporter of workers, with about 6.1 workers leaving the municipality for every one entering. Of the working population, 6% used public transportation to get to work, and 64% used a private car.

== Religion ==
From the 2000 census, 121 or 16.6% were Roman Catholic, while 494 or 67.7% belonged to the Swiss Reformed Church. Of the rest of the population, there were 2 members of an Orthodox church (or about 0.27% of the population), and there were 29 individuals (or about 3.97% of the population) who belonged to another Christian church. There were 4 individuals who belonged to another church. 46 (or about 6.30% of the population) belonged to no church, are agnostic or atheist, and 34 individuals (or about 4.66% of the population) did not answer the question.

== Education ==
In Grandcour about 273 or (37.4%) of the population have completed non-mandatory upper secondary education, and 70 or (9.6%) have completed additional higher education (either university or a Fachhochschule). Of the 70 who completed tertiary schooling, 68.6% were Swiss men, 27.1% were Swiss women.

In the 2009/2010 school year there were a total of 113 students in the Grandcour school district. In the Vaud cantonal school system, two years of non-obligatory pre-school are provided by the political districts. During the school year, the political district provided pre-school care for a total of 155 children of which 83 children (53.5%) received subsidized pre-school care. The canton's primary school program requires students to attend for four years. There were 55 students in the municipal primary school program. The obligatory lower secondary school program lasts for six years and there were 57 students in those schools. There were also 1 students who were home schooled or attended another non-traditional school.

As of 2000, there were 27 students in Grandcour who came from another municipality, while 94 residents attended schools outside the municipality.
