= Forel, Fribourg =

Former municipality, canton of Fribourg

Forel
- Former municipality
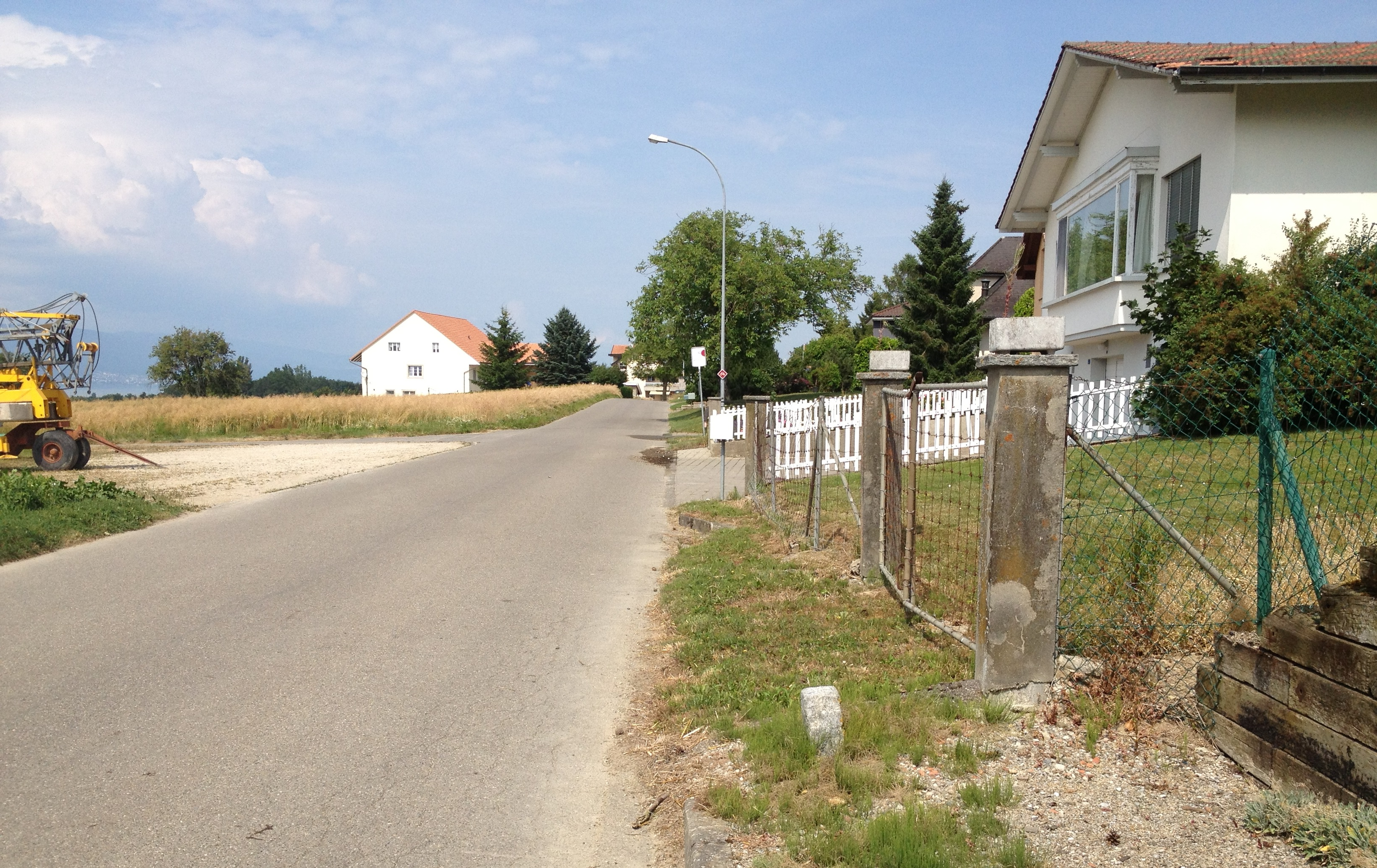
- Forel

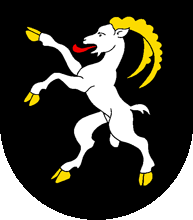
- Coat of arms
- Location of Forel
- Location within Switzerland Location within Canton of Fribourg
- Coordinates: 46.876111°N 6.888333°E
- Country: Switzerland
- Canton: Fribourg
- District: Broye
- Municipality: Estavayer

Population (2000)
  - Total: 339
- Time zone: UTC+01:00 (CET)
  - Summer (DST): UTC+02:00 (CEST)
- ISO 3166 code: CH-FR
- Website

Forel is a former municipality in the Broye district of the canton of Fribourg, Switzerland. From 2006 to 2016 it formed the municipality of Vernay with Autavaux and Montbrelloz, and since 2017 it has been part of the municipality of Estavayer. The village stands on a cliff above Lake Neuchâtel and includes the hamlet of Les Planches.

== History ==
Forel is first mentioned in 1239 as Forest. Two lakeside settlement sites, from the Neolithic and the Bronze Age, are known there. Forel belonged to the mandement (castellany) of Estavayer; in 1594 Louis Griset bought it and made it a lordship. From 1536 it belonged to the bailiwick of Estavayer, and from 1798 to 1848 to the district of the same name.

Two-thirds of the inhabitants belonged to the parish of Estavayer, while Les Planches belonged to Ressudens and, after the Reformation, to Rueyres-les-Prés. From 1848 Forel and Autavaux claimed rights from the parish of Estavayer, which were refused, and the conflict grew bitter. In 1907 the village of Forel was attached to the parish of Rueyres-les-Prés. A rectorate of Forel-Autavaux was created in 1909, and the parish of Forel-Autavaux in 1942. The chapel of 1687, dedicated to Saints Gorgon and Garin, was enlarged in 1923.

Land consolidation took place from 1971 to 1989. Cereals and fodder crops are grown. Forel had 133 inhabitants in 1811, 155 in 1850, 183 in 1900, 220 in 1950, 195 in 1980 and 339 in 2000. From 2006 to 2016 it formed the municipality of Vernay with Autavaux and Montbrelloz; since 2017 it has been part of Estavayer.

== Bibliography ==
- La Liberté, 10–27 April 1909 (several articles)
- Des murs, des noms, des visages, 1974
