= Marigny, Jura =

Commune in Bourgogne-Franche-Comté, France

Marigny
- Commune
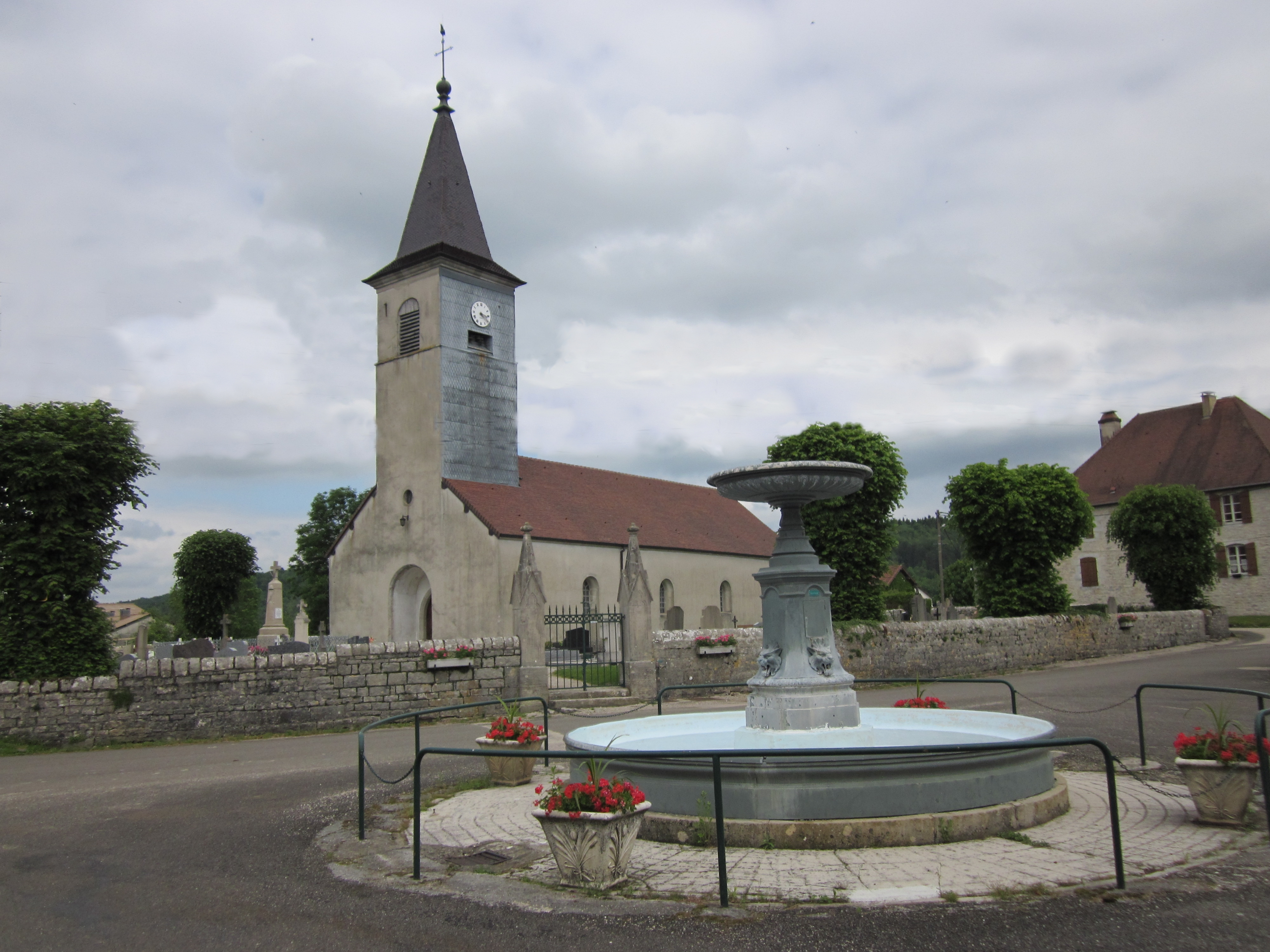
- The church in Marigny
- Location of Marigny
- Location within France Location within Bourgogne-Franche-Comté
- Coordinates: 46°40′58″N 5°47′03″E
- Country: France
- Region: Bourgogne-Franche-Comté
- Department: Jura
- Arrondissement: Lons-le-Saunier
- Canton: Saint-Laurent-en-Grandvaux

Government
  - Mayor (2020–2026): Louis-Pierre Mareschal
- Area^{1}: 11.99 km^{2} (4.63 sq mi)
- Highest elevation: 628 m (2,060 ft)
- Lowest elevation: 454 m (1,490 ft)
- Population (2023): 215
  - Density: 17.9/km^{2} (46.4/sq mi)
- Time zone: UTC+01:00 (CET)
  - Summer (DST): UTC+02:00 (CEST)
- INSEE/Postal code: 39313 /39130
- ^{1} French Land Register data, which excludes lakes, ponds, glaciers > 1 km^{2} (0.386 sq mi or 247 acres) and river estuaries.

Marigny (French pronunciation: [maʁiɲi]; Arpitan: Maregny) is a commune in the Jura department in Bourgogne-Franche-Comté in eastern France.

== Population ==
Historical population
Year	Pop.	±% p.a.
1968	149	—
1975	125	−2.48%
1982	126	+0.11%
1990	153	+2.46%
1999	174	+1.44%
2007	180	+0.42%
2012	186	+0.66%
2017	207	+2.16%
2023	215	+0.63%
Source: INSEE

== World Heritage Site ==
The western shore of Lac de Chalain is home to one or more prehistoric pile-dwelling (or stilt house) settlements that are part of the Prehistoric Pile dwellings around the Alps UNESCO World Heritage Site.

== See also ==
- Communes of the Jura department
