= Doucier =

Commune in Bourgogne-Franche-Comté, France

Doucier Duci (Arpitan)
- Commune
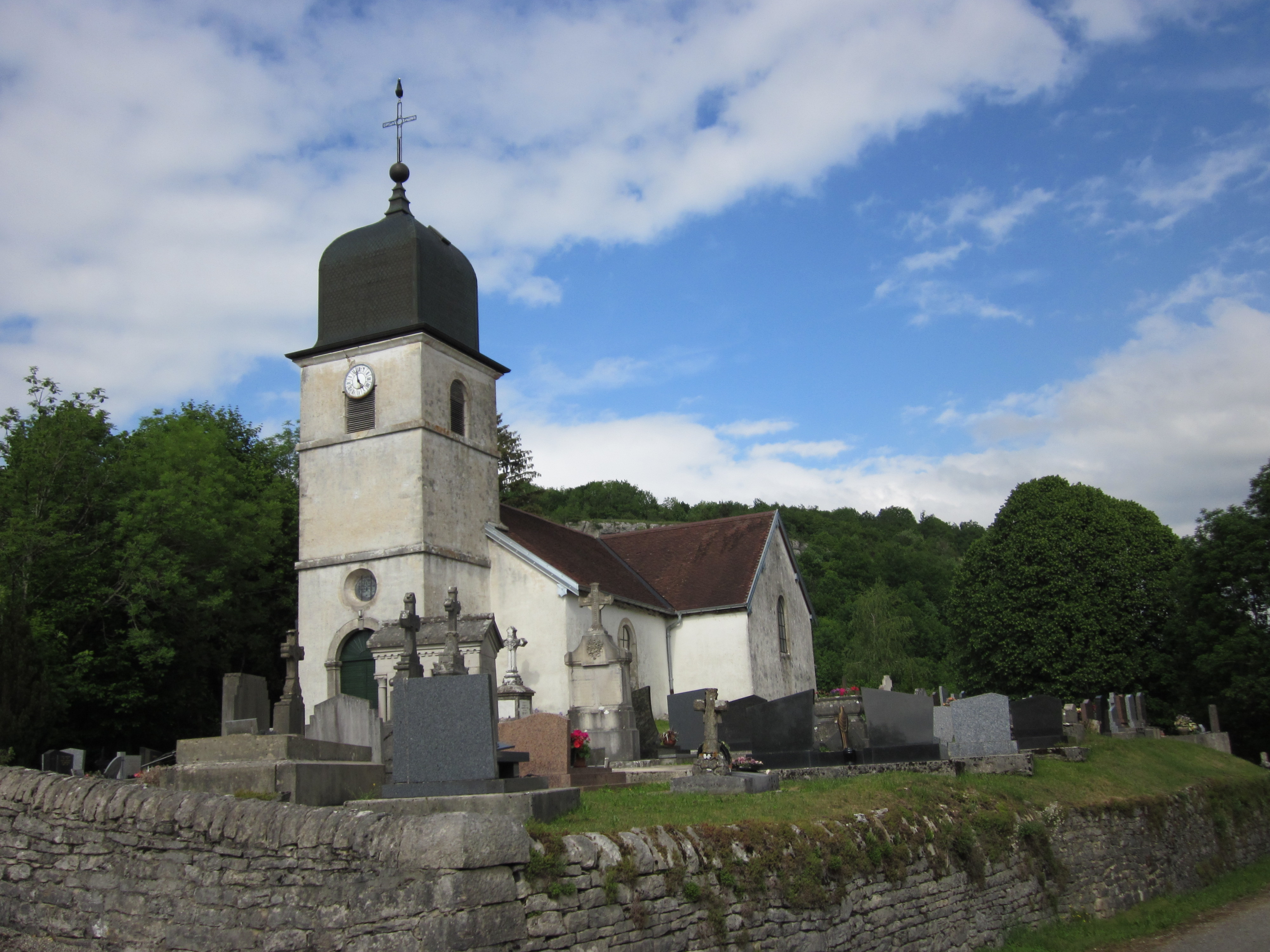
- The church in Doucier

- Coat of arms
- Location of Doucier
- Location within France Location within Bourgogne-Franche-Comté
- Coordinates: 46°39′20″N 5°46′47″E
- Country: France
- Region: Bourgogne-Franche-Comté
- Department: Jura
- Arrondissement: Lons-le-Saunier
- Canton: Saint-Laurent-en-Grandvaux

Government
  - Mayor (2020–2026): Nathalie Roux
- Area^{1}: 12.52 km^{2} (4.83 sq mi)
- Highest elevation: 635 m (2,083 ft)
- Lowest elevation: 447 m (1,467 ft)
- Population (2023): 285
  - Density: 22.8/km^{2} (59.0/sq mi)
- Time zone: UTC+01:00 (CET)
  - Summer (DST): UTC+02:00 (CEST)
- INSEE/Postal code: 39201 /39130
- ^{1} French Land Register data, which excludes lakes, ponds, glaciers > 1 km^{2} (0.386 sq mi or 247 acres) and river estuaries.

Doucier (French pronunciation: [dusje]; Arpitan: Duci) is a commune in the Jura department in Bourgogne-Franche-Comté in eastern France.

== Population ==
Historical population
Year	Pop.	±% p.a.
1968	224	—
1975	192	−2.18%
1982	202	+0.73%
1990	231	+1.69%
1999	270	+1.75%
2007	285	+0.68%
2012	300	+1.03%
2017	298	−0.13%
2023	285	−0.74%
Source: INSEE

== World Heritage Site ==
The western shore of Lac de Chalain is home to one or more prehistoric pile-dwelling (or stilt house) settlements that are part of the Prehistoric Pile dwellings around the Alps UNESCO World Heritage Site.

== See also ==
- Communes of the Jura department
