= Fontenu =

Commune in Jura, France

- Commune
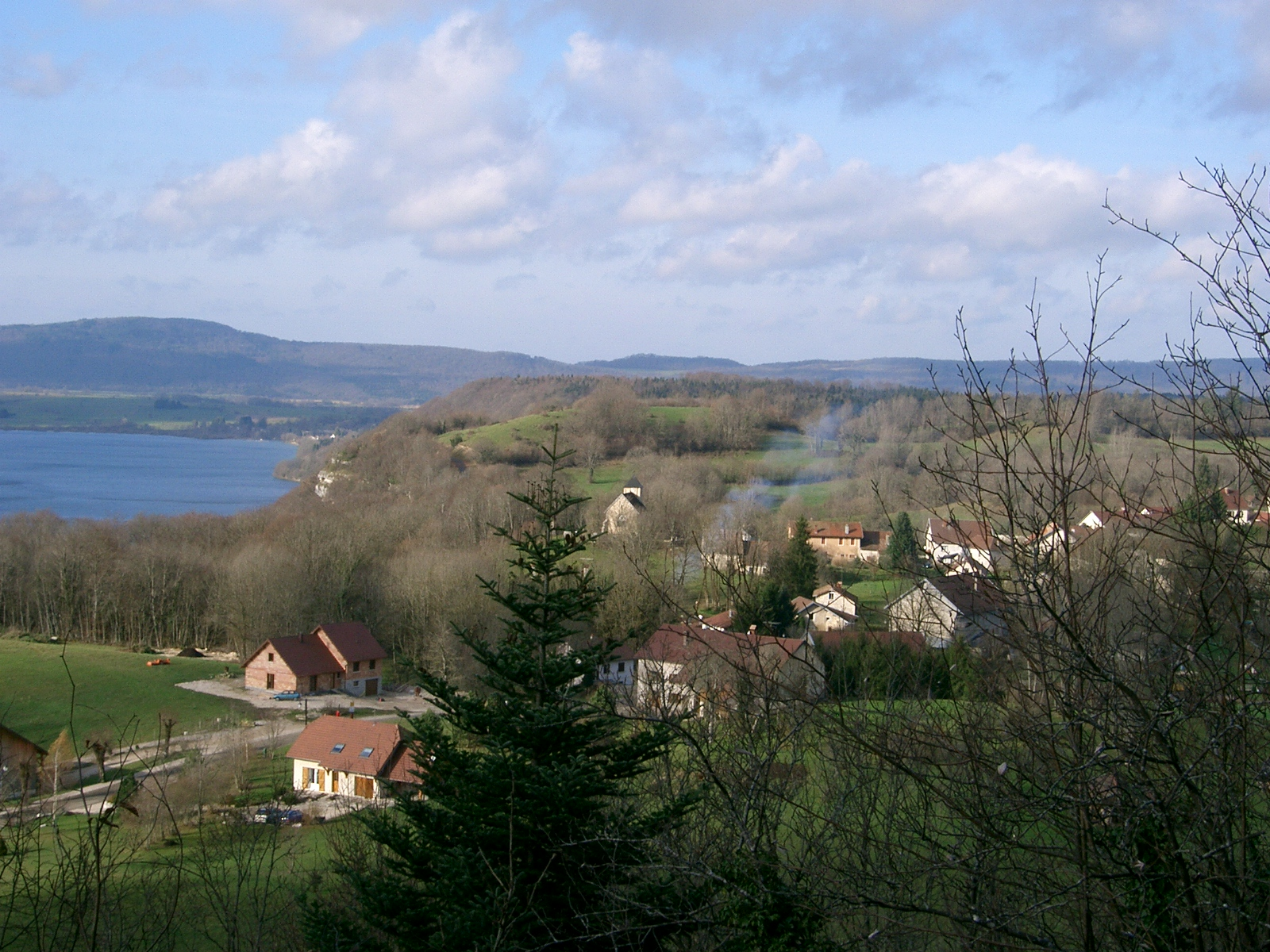
- A general view of Fontenu
- Location of Fontenu
- Location within France Location within Bourgogne-Franche-Comté
- Coordinates: 46°40′07″N 5°49′23″E
- Country: France
- Region: Bourgogne-Franche-Comté
- Department: Jura
- Arrondissement: Lons-le-Saunier
- Canton: Saint-Laurent-en-Grandvaux

Government
  - Mayor (2020–2026): Alexandre Perrin
- Area^{1}: 6.71 km^{2} (2.59 sq mi)
- Highest elevation: 667 m (2,188 ft)
- Lowest elevation: 485 m (1,591 ft)
- Population (2023): 72
  - Density: 11/km^{2} (28/sq mi)
- Time zone: UTC+01:00 (CET)
  - Summer (DST): UTC+02:00 (CEST)
- INSEE/Postal code: 39230 /39130
- ^{1} French Land Register data, which excludes lakes, ponds, glaciers > 1 km^{2} (0.386 sq mi or 247 acres) and river estuaries.

Fontenu (French pronunciation: [fɔ̃tny]; Arpitan: Fontënu) is a commune in the Jura department in Bourgogne-Franche-Comté in eastern France.

== Population ==
Historical population
Year	Pop.	±% p.a.
1968	52	—
1975	50	−0.56%
1982	47	−0.88%
1990	35	−3.62%
1999	40	+1.49%
2007	48	+2.31%
2012	70	+7.84%
2017	75	+1.39%
2023	72	−0.68%
Source: INSEE

== World Heritage Site ==
It is home to one or more prehistoric pile-dwelling (or stilt house) settlements that are part of the Prehistoric Pile dwellings around the Alps UNESCO World Heritage Site.

== See also ==
- Lac de Chalain
- Communes of the Jura department
