= Lac de Chalain =

Lake in Jura, France

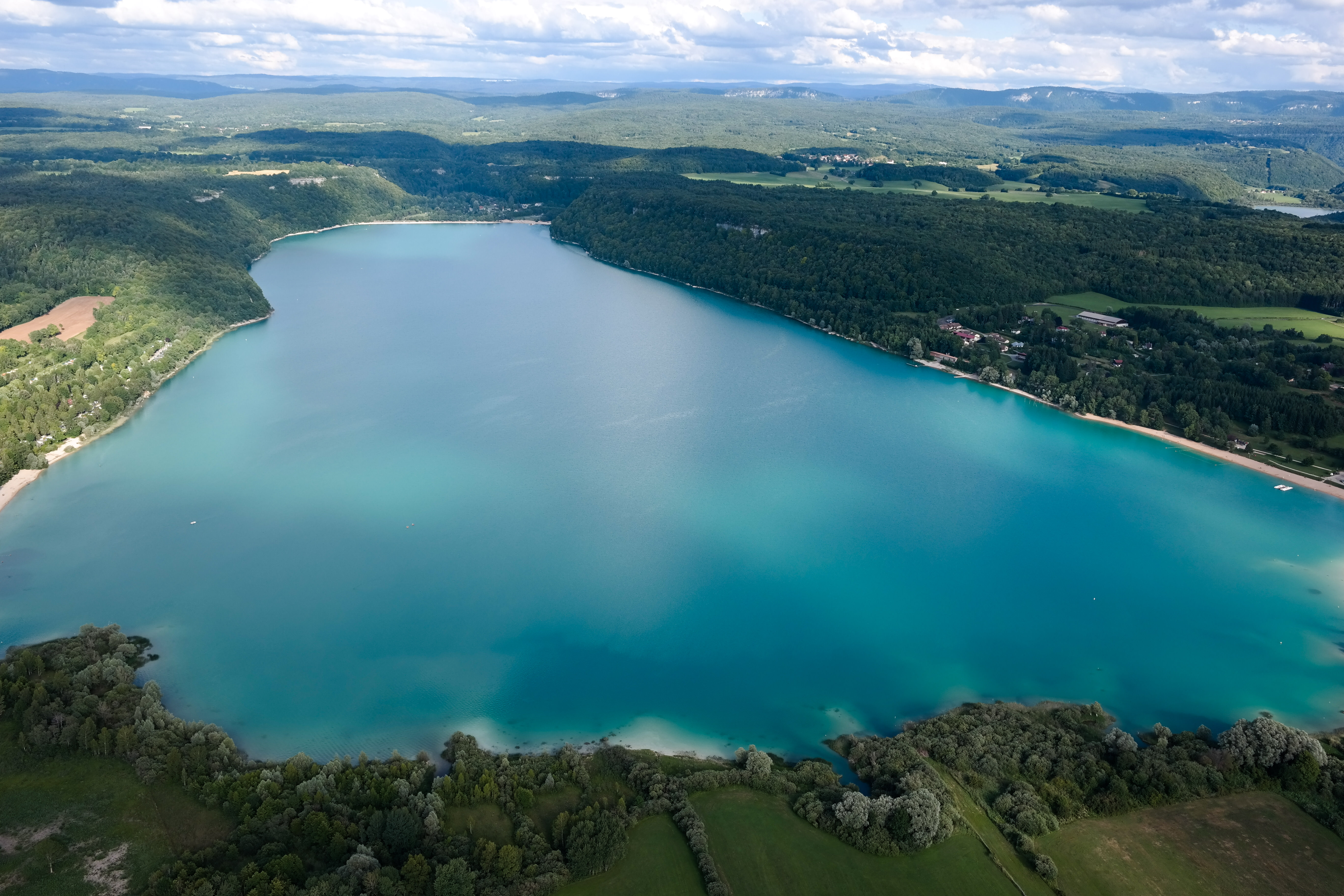
- The Lac de Chalain

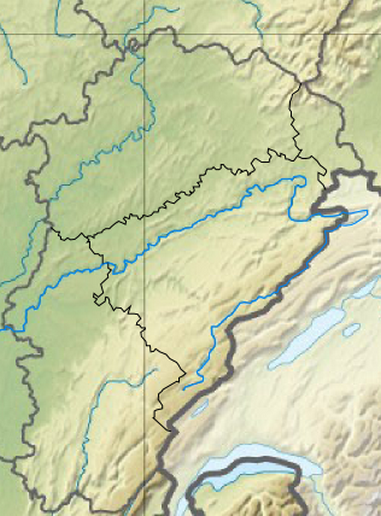
- Location within Franche-Comté
- Location: Fontenu, Jura
- Coordinates: 46°40′13.74″N 5°47′37.19″E
- Type: Lake
- Primary outflows: Ain
- Catchment area: 44 km^{2} (17 sq mi)
- Basin countries: France
- Max. length: 2,700 m (8,900 ft)
- Max. width: 1,100 m (3,600 ft)
- Surface area: 2.32 km^{2} (0.90 sq mi)
- Average depth: 16.6 m (54 ft)
- Max. depth: 39 m (128 ft)
- Surface elevation: 486 m (1,594 ft)

The Lac de Chalain (French pronunciation: [lak də ʃalɛ̃]; 'Lake of Chalain') is a glacial lake in the Jura department of France. It lies wholly within the commune of Fontenu, near Marigny and Doucier, in the Bourgogne-Franche-Comté region.

Pre-historic pile-dwelling settlements (c. 4000-750 BC) found at its western end—and at nearby Grand Lac de Clairvaux—have been classified as French historical monuments since 1911 and were added to the UNESCO World Heritage List in 2011.

== Geography ==
The lake is the largest natural lake in the department. Its 60-80 m (260 ft) high limestone cliffs frame a roughly rectangular body of water 2.7 kilometres (1.7 mi) long, 1.1 kilometres (0.68 mi) wide and in places more than 30 metres (98 ft) deep.

It occupies an east-west oriented reculée that opens into the Combe d'Ain. The natural spillway forms the 2 kilometres (1.2 mi) Bief de l'Œuf, which drives a small hydro-electric turbine before joining the river Ain.

Karstic springs feed the lake from the higher plateaus and from the lakes of Narlay and Vernois.

== History ==
Systematic archaeological excavations began in 1904 (during construction of the hydroelectric outlet) and resumed in the 2000s, reveal a continuous human presence from 4000 BC to 750 BC. A large collection of artefacts are held at the Musée d'Archéologie du Jura in Lons-le-Saunier. The most notable is a 9.35 metres (30.7 ft) long dugout canoe dated by dendrochronology to 959 BC.

Lowering water levels in 1904 exposed the site but destroyed perhaps two-thirds of the Neolithic layers. Subsequent agriculture, drainage and tourism have further damaged the remains. The archaeological zones were protected in 1992 and given UNESCO recognition in 2011.

A hunting lodge (later Château de Chalain) was built in the 13th century, remodelled in the 16th and 18th centuries, and abandoned after a fire in August 1945. In the 1960s, the ruins and estate passed to the Jura department.

== Ecology ==
The central shores expose marl sediment which supports rare calcicole plants that are strictly protected. Access is prohibited to prevent trampling.

In 2022, the departmental council closed the lakeside campsite and stopped the annual artificial draw-down to address eutrophication.

== See also ==
- List of lakes of France
- Geology of the Jura Mountains
- Parc naturel régional du Haut-Jura
