= Prehistoric pile dwellings around the Alps =

UNESCO World Heritage Site in Europe

Prehistoric Pile Dwellings around the Alps
UNESCO World Heritage Site
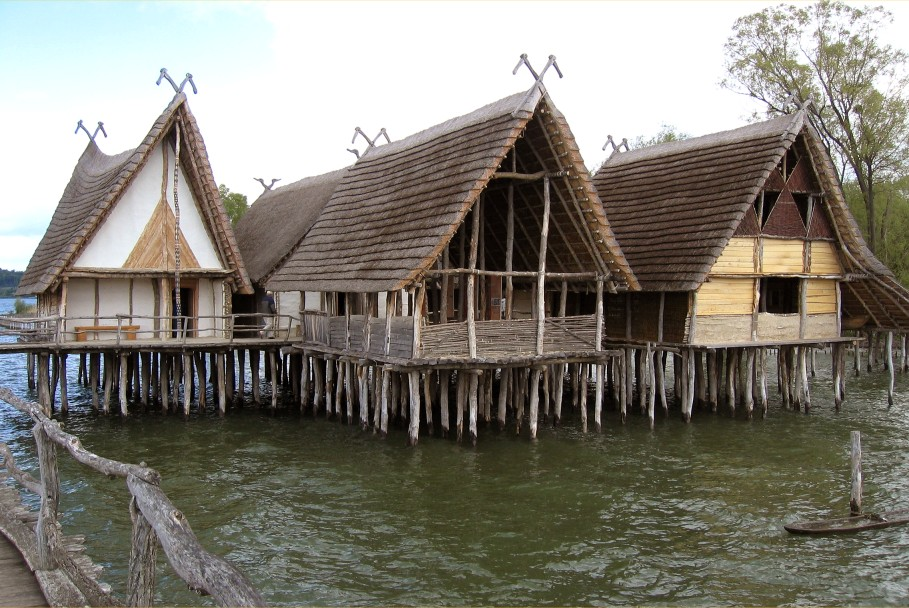
- Reconstructed pile dwellings at the Pfahlbau Museum Unteruhldingen on Lake Constance in Germany
- Interactive map of Prehistoric Pile Dwellings around the Alps
- Location: (see map)
- Includes: 111 locations in Austria, France, Germany, Italy, Slovenia and Switzerland
- Criteria: Cultural: (iv), (v)
- Reference: 1363
- Inscription: 2011 (35th Session)
- Area: 274.2 ha (678 acres)
- Buffer zone: 3,960.77 ha (9,787.3 acres)
- Website: www.palafittes.org

Prehistoric pile dwellings around the Alps are a series of prehistoric pile dwelling (or stilt house) settlements in and around the Alps built from about 5000 to 500 BC on the edges of lakes, rivers or wetlands. In 2011, 111 sites located variously in Switzerland (56), Italy (19), Germany (18), France (11), Austria (5) and Slovenia (2) were added to the UNESCO World Heritage Site list. In Slovenia, these were the first World Heritage Sites to be listed for their cultural value.

Excavations conducted at some of the sites have yielded evidence regarding prehistoric life and the way communities interacted with their environment during the Neolithic and Bronze Ages in Alpine Europe. These settlements are a unique group of exceptionally well-preserved and culturally rich archaeological sites, which constitute one of the most important sources for the study of early agrarian societies in the region.

Contrary to popular belief, the dwellings were not erected over water, but on nearby marshy land. They were set on piles to protect against occasional flooding. Because the lakes have grown in size over time, many of the original piles are now under water, giving modern observers the false impression that they have always been this way. Climate change is changing the habitats of these sites.

== Map ==
Locations of all UNESCO prehistoric pile dwellings around the Alps World Heritage sites

== Sites ==
Country	Serial ID Number	Name	Location	Coordinates	Location size (Ha)	Buffer zone (Ha)	Approx. Date occupied (BC)
Switzerland	1363-001	Ägelmoos	Beinwil am See	47°16′43.047″N 8°12′27.44″E	0.96	10.5	2000–1000
Switzerland	1363-002	Riesi	Seengen	47°19′6.532″N 8°12′14.29″E	3.8	16.5	1500–500
Switzerland	1363-003	Vingelz / Hafen	Biel/Bienne	47°7′55.585″N 7°13′24.3″E	0.6	18.4	3000–2500
Switzerland	1363-004	Dorfstation	Lüscherz	47°2′55.464″N 7°9′0.22″E	3.4	75.1	4000–3500, 3000–2500, 1000–500
Switzerland	1363-005	Lobsigensee	Seedorf	47°1′58.487″N 7°17′59.989″E	1.1	27.6	3500–3000
Switzerland	1363-006	Rütte	Sutz-Lattrigen	47°6′18.364″N 7°12′46.78″E	2.8	49.6	3000–2500
Switzerland	1363-007	Bahnhof	Twann	47°5′43.915″N 7°9′27.74″E	2.5	18.5	4000–3000
Switzerland	1363-008	Strandboden	Vinelz	47°2′21.059″N 7°6′33.56″E	2.3	28.7	4000–2500
Switzerland	1363-009	Les Grèves	Gletterens	46°54′19.098″N 6°55′46.37″E	2.62	2.4	3500–3000
Switzerland	1363-010	Spitz	Greng	46°55′21.014″N 7°5′25.93″E	7.69	7.3	4000–3500, 3000–2500, 1500–500
Switzerland	1363-011	Môtier I	Haut-Vully	46°57′0.889″N 7°5′19.87″E	1.42	1.3	Neolithic
Switzerland	1363-012	Segelboothafen	Murten	46°55′47.323″N 7°6′48.28″E	2.83	4.7	3000–2500
Switzerland	1363-013	En Praz des Gueux	Prez	46°47′39.2″N 7°2′12.7″E	0.08	2.02	4000–3500
Switzerland	1363-014	Bellerive I	Collonge-Bellerive	46°15′12.03″N 6°11′25.6″E	2.4	8.87	1000–500
Switzerland	1363-015	Port	Corsier	46°16′5.61″N 6°12′37.7″E	1.94	10.9	4000–3500, 3000–2500, 2000–1500, 1000–500
Switzerland	1363-016	Bourg	Versoix	46°16′52.29″N 6°10′14.63″E	3.03	15.93	1500–500
Switzerland	1363-017	Egolzwil 3	Egolzwil	47°10′56.55″N 8°0′59.36″E	0.65	56.82	5000–4000
Switzerland	1363-018	Seematte	Hitzkirch	47°12′58.48″N 8°15′15.2″E	2.81	24.55	4000–2500
Switzerland	1363-019	Halbinsel	Sursee	47°10′13.13″N 8°7′28.27″E	3.55	67.78	4000–3500, 2500–500
Switzerland	1363-020	Port-Conty	Saint-Aubin-Sauges	46°53′25.42″N 6°46′14.73″E	1.04	7.03	4000–2000
Switzerland	1363-021	Les Argilliez	Gorgier	46°54′11.8″N 6°47′23.61″E	1.32	1.2	4000–3500
Switzerland	1363-022	L’Abbaye 2	Bevaix	46°55′34.54″N 6°49′50.56″E	1.04	5.01	1040–986
Switzerland	1363-023	La Saunerie	Milvignes	46°58′14.3″N 6°52′17.78″E	1.51	1.63	4000–3500, 3000–2000
Switzerland	1363-024	Les Graviers	Milvignes	46°58′22.45″N 6°52′29.99″E	0.57	2.13	3500–2500, 2000–1500, 1000–500
Switzerland	1363-025	Kehrsiten	Stansstad	47°0′7.92″N 8°21′58.65″E	1.26	5.14	4000–3000
Switzerland	1363-026	Weier I – III	Thayngen	47°44′10.11″N 8°42′16.02″E	0.48	3.44	4000–3500
Switzerland	1363-027	Freienbach–Hurden Rosshorn	Hurden	47°13′10.38″N 8°48′24.6″E	4.32	20.1	3500–3000, 2000–500
Switzerland	1363-028	Freienbach–Hurden Seefeld	Hurden	47°12′43.05″N 8°48′8.22″E	2.4	16.12	3500–2500
Switzerland	1363-029	Burgäschisee Ost	Aeschi	47°10′7.33″N 7°40′20.48″E	0.3	90.69	4000–3500, 3000–2500
Switzerland	1363-030	Inkwilersee Insel	Bolken/Inkwil	47°11′55.23″N 7°39′45.79″E	0.1	45.71	4000-3500, 3000–2500, 1000–500
Switzerland	1363-031	Feldbach	Kempraten/Feldbach	47°14′19.66″N 8°47′45.96″E	7.5	15.5	4000–1000
Switzerland	1363-032	Rapperswil-Jona–Technikum	Rapperswil	47°13′14.21″N 8°48′56.55″E	0.92	49.1	2000–1500
Switzerland	1363-033	Bleiche 2–3	Arbon	47°30′13.72″N 9°25′39.93″E	2.37	5.84	3500–3000, 2000–1500
Switzerland	1363-034	Insel Werd	Eschenz	47°39′18.87″N 8°52′1.19″E	2.8	44.08	4000–2500, 1500–500
Switzerland	1363-035	Egelsee	Gachnang-Niederwil	47°33′30.45″N 8°51′46.8″E	2.97	5.94	4000–3500
Switzerland	1363-036	Nussbaumersee	Hüttwilen	47°36′53.3″N 8°48′55.05″E	3.66	16.86	5000–2500, 1000–500
Switzerland	1363-037	Pointe de Montbec I	Chabrey	46°56′2.97″N 6°58′13.73″E	1.78	8.04	1500–500
Switzerland	1363-038	La Bessime	Chevroux	46°53′14.48″N 6°53′35.57″E	1.07	22.1	4000–3500, 1000–500
Switzerland	1363-039	Village	Chevroux	46°53′33.4″N 6°54′5.37″E	1.54	38.4	3500–2000
Switzerland	1363-040	Stations de Concise	Corcelles-près-Concise	46°50′47.16″N 6°42′57.51″E	6.5	11.5	4000–2500
Switzerland	1363-041	Corcelettes Les Violes	Grandson	46°49′4.99″N 6°40′5.27″E	2.59	17.4	1500–500
Switzerland	1363-042	Les Roseaux	Morges	46°30′54.16″N 6°30′30.17″E	0.86	8.1	2000–1000
Switzerland	1363-043	Stations de Morges	Morges	46°30′36.34″N 6°30′10.3″E	2.12	7.91	2000–1000
Switzerland	1363-044	Chenevières de Guévaux I	Mur, now Vully-les-Lacs	46°56′5.88″N 7°3′17.69″E	1.04	9.73	2000–1500
Switzerland	1363-045	Baie de Clendy	Yverdon-les-Bains	46°46′48.62″N 6°39′12.77″E	1.87	38.7	4000–1500
Switzerland	1363-046	Le Marais	Yvonand	46°47′57.64″N 6°45′11.82″E	1.95	16.8	3500–2500, 1000–500
Switzerland	1363-047	Oterswil / Insel Eielen	Zug	47°7′36.26″N 8°29′50.46″E	0.45	10.82	3000–2000
Switzerland	1363-048	Riedmatt	Zug	47°10′56.95″N 8°29′28.12″E	0.28	2.61	3500–2500, 1500–1000
Switzerland	1363-049	Sumpf	Zug	47°10′57.99″N 8°28′41.78″E	1.55	7.5	1500–500
Switzerland	1363-050	Erlenbach–Winkel	Erlenbach	47°17′49.91″N 8°35′46.31″E	3.01	6.6	4000–1500, 1000–500
Switzerland	1363-051	Greifensee–Storen/Wildsberg	Greifensee	47°21′37.8″N 8°40′51.51″E	9.59	11.7	4000–2500
Switzerland	1363-052	Meilen–Rorenhaab	Meilen	47°15′50.14″N 8°39′36.82″E	0.7	4.8	4000–2500, 2000–1500, 1000–500
Switzerland	1363-053	Wädenswil–Vorder Au	Wädenswil	47°14′48.88″N 8°39′11.64″E	1.49	22.5	3500–1500
Switzerland	1363-054	Wetzikon-Robenhausen	Wetzikon	47°20′9.05″N 8°47′8.16″E	0.92	155	4000–2500, 2000–1500, 1000–500
Switzerland	1363-055	Zürich–Enge Alpenquai	Zürich	47°21′52.06″N 8°32′19.47″E	2.93	17.4	1500–500
Switzerland	1363-056	Kleiner Hafner	Zürich	47°21′58.19″N 8°32′38.66″E	0.64	16.56	5000–1500, 1000–500
Austria	1363-057	Keutschacher See	Keutschach am See	46°35′13.28″N 14°9′34.06″E	0.21	132.5	4000–3500, 1000–500
Austria	1363-058	Abtsdorf I	Attersee am Attersee	47°53′40.96″N 13°32′1.07″E	1.1	91.43	1500–1000
Austria	1363-059	Abtsdorf III	Attersee am Attersee	47°53′35.56″N 13°31′59.34″E	0.22	91.43	4000–3000
Austria	1363-060	Litzlberg Süd	Seewalchen am Attersee	47°56′3.66″N 13°33′16.99″E	0.76	65.26	4000–3000
Austria	1363-061	See	Mondsee	47°48′13.97″N 13°26′57.41″E	1.22	0.97	3500–3000
France	1363-062	Le Grand Lac de Clairvaux	Clairvaux-les-Lacs	46°34′16.28″N 5°44′58.88″E	15.2	103.05	4000–500
France	1363-063	Lac de Chalain, rive occidentale	Marigny, Doucier, Fontenu	46°40′19.726″N 5°46′34.84″E	50.65	96.83	5300–600
France	1363-064	Lac d’Aiguebelette, zone sud	Aiguebelette-le-Lac, Saint-Alban-de-Montbel	45°32′36.02″N 5°48′16.85″E	0.64	42.87	3000–2500
France	1363-065	Baie de Grésine	Brison-Saint-Innocent	45°44′11.857″N 5°53′8.43″E	4.09	31.5	1000–500
France	1363-066	Baie de Châtillon	Chindrieux	45°47′51.878″N 5°51′3.37″E	0.91	7.6	1000–500
France	1363-067	Hautecombe	Saint-Pierre-de-Curtille	45°44′59.23″N 5°50′27.07″E	2.03	5.7	3500–3000
France	1363-068	Littoral de Tresserve	Tresserve	45°41′2.681″N 5°53′34.15″E	2.12	72.4	1000–500
France	1363-069	Littoral de Chens-sur-Léman	Chens-sur-Léman	46°19′16.068″N 6°15′21.42″E	0.93	92.6	1500–500
France	1363-070	Les Marais de Saint-Jorioz	Saint-Jorioz	45°50′6.749″N 6°10′58.29″E	0.49	4.3	4000–3500
France	1363-071	Le Crêt de Chatillon	Sévrier	45°51′37.4″N 6°9′19.8″E	1.07	8.2	1500–500
France	1363-072	Secteur des Mongets	Sévrier, Saint-Jorioz	45°51′11.714″N 6°9′4.64″E	0.13	63.2	2000–1500
Germany	1363-073	Wangen-Hinterhorn	Öhningen	47°39′39.416″N 8°56′20.02″E	2.56	3.2	4000–2500, 1500–500
Germany	1363-074	Hornstaad-Hörnle	Gaienhofen	47°41′40.229″N 9°0′21.30″E	13.11	72.4	4000–2500
Germany	1363-075	Allensbach-Strandbad	Allensbach	47°42′35.132″N 9°4′47.33″E	2.65	6.6	4000–2500
Germany	1363-076	Wollmatingen-Langenrain	Konstanz	47°40′29.582″N 9°7′13.32″E	1.55	83.7	1000–500
Germany	1363-077	Konstanz-Hinterhausen	Konstanz	47°39′54.788″N 9°11′38.65″E	4.15	4.12	4000–3500, 3000–2500
Germany	1363-078	Litzelstetten-Krähenhorn 32	Konstanz	47°43′28.823″N 9°10′44.23″E	7.51	47.92	3960–3805
Germany	1363-079	Bodman-Schachen / Löchle	Bodman-Ludwigshafen	47°48′52.11″N 9°2′23.11″E	5.34	14.1	4000–3500, 3000–2500, 2000–1000
Germany	1363-080	Sipplingen-Osthafen	Sipplingen	47°47′35.304″N 9°6′7.29″E	4.61	6.23	3919–2417, 934–933
Germany	1363-081	Unteruhldingen-Stollenwiesen	Uhldingen-Mühlhofen	47°43′15.258″N 9°13′42.18″E	4.22	4.52	4000–3500, 3000–2500, 2000–500
Germany	1363-082	Ödenahlen	Alleshausen	48°7′9.163″N 9°38′27.54″E	0.97	58.02	4000–3500
Germany	1363-083	Grundwiesen	Alleshausen	48°6′30.744″N 9°37′35.75″E	0.54	3.42	3020–2700
Germany	1363-084	Siedlung Forschner	Bad Buchau	48°3′17.492″N 9°38′25.92″E	3.54	285.14	1767–1480
Germany	1363-085	Olzreute-Enzisholz	Bad Schussenried	47°59′54.859″N 9°41′19.26″E	1.82	20.62	3000–2500
Germany	1363-086	Schreckensee	Wolpertswende	47°53′18.56″N 9°34′7.77″E	1.06	7.05	3651–3263
Germany	1363-087	Ehrenstein	Blaustein	48°24′38.707″N 9°55′23.68″E	1.33	2.42	4000–3500
Germany	1363-088	Pestenacker	Weil	48°8′48.044″N 10°56′52.29″E	0.57	3.66	3495–3481
Germany	1363-089	Unfriedshausen	Geltendorf	48°8′32.359″N 10°57′4.28″E	0.79	7.69	3813–3535
Germany	1363-090	Rose Island	Feldafing	47°56′29.522″N 11°18′33.52″E	15.16	34.3	5000–2500, 2000–500
Italy	1363-091	Palù di Livenza – Santissima	Polcenigo	46°1′18.268″N 12°28′52.13″E	13.48	86.72	4766–4375, 3768–3538
Italy	1363-092	Lavagnone	Desenzano del Garda	45°26′11.094″N 10°32′14.68″E	6.04	14.45	2500–1000
Italy	1363-093	San Sivino, Gabbiano	Manerba del Garda	45°32′7.944″N 10°33′27.94″E	1.85	3.46	2500–1500
Italy	1363-094	Lugana Vecchia	Sirmione	45°27′30.121″N 10°38′36.8″E	2.59	11.16	2500–1000
Italy	1363-095	Lucone	Polpenazze del Garda	45°33′3.326″N 10°29′17.19″E	7.66	68.2	5000–3500, 2500–1500
Italy	1363-096	Lagazzi del Vho	Piadena	45°6′27.544″N 10°23′34.71″E	2.77	18.46	2000–1500
Italy	1363-097	Bande – Corte Carpani	Cavriana	45°22′16.878″N 10°35′9.61″E	7.33	36.4	2005–1959
Italy	1363-098	Castellaro Lagusello – Fondo Tacoli	Monzambano	45°22′9.343″N 10°38′3.13″E	1.23	59.04	2000–1000
Italy	1363-099	Isolino Virginia-Camilla-Isola di San Biagio	Biandronno	45°48′43.25″N 8°43′5.02″E	3.79	25.07	5000–1000
Italy	1363-100	Bodio centrale o delle Monete	Bodio Lomnago	45°47′47.152″N 8°45′20.19″E	1.67	28.55	2000–1000
Italy	1363-101	Il Sabbione o settentrionale	Cadrezzate	45°47′58.625″N 8°38′55.64″E	1.18	9.61	2000–1000
Italy	1363-102	VI.1-Emissario	Viverone, Azeglio	45°25′5.743″N 8°1′22.44″E	5.86	852.77	2000–1000
Italy	1363-103	Mercurago	Arona	45°44′1.709″N 8°33′7.6″E	5.16	270.06	2000–1000
Italy	1363-104	Molina di Ledro	Ledro	45°52′26.857″N 10°45′54.05″E	0.78	2.31	1900–1300
Italy	1363-105	Fiavé-Lago Carera	Fiavè	45°59′24.346″N 10°49′51.55″E	10.7	73.92	4000–3500, 2000–1000
Italy	1363-106	Belvedere	Peschiera del Garda	45°27′22.705″N 10°39′30.31″E	2.52	12.46	2500–1500
Italy	1363-107	Frassino	Peschiera del Garda	45°26′5.168″N 10°39′47.51″E	1.48	31.19	2000–1000
Italy	1363-108	Tombola	Cerea	45°10′46.348″N 11°12′40.5″E	1.51	123.76	1500–1000
Italy	1363-109	Laghetto della Costa	Arquà Petrarca	45°16′10.844″N 11°44′32.68″E	1.56	6.52	2500–1500
Slovenia	1363-110	Kolišča na Igu, severna skupina	Ig	45°58′32.318″N 14°31′46.19″E	19.2	516.65	3000–1500
Slovenia	1363-111	Kolišča na Igu, južna skupina	Ig	45°58′14.221″N 14°32′29.84″E	26.1	516.55	5000–2500

== Gallery ==
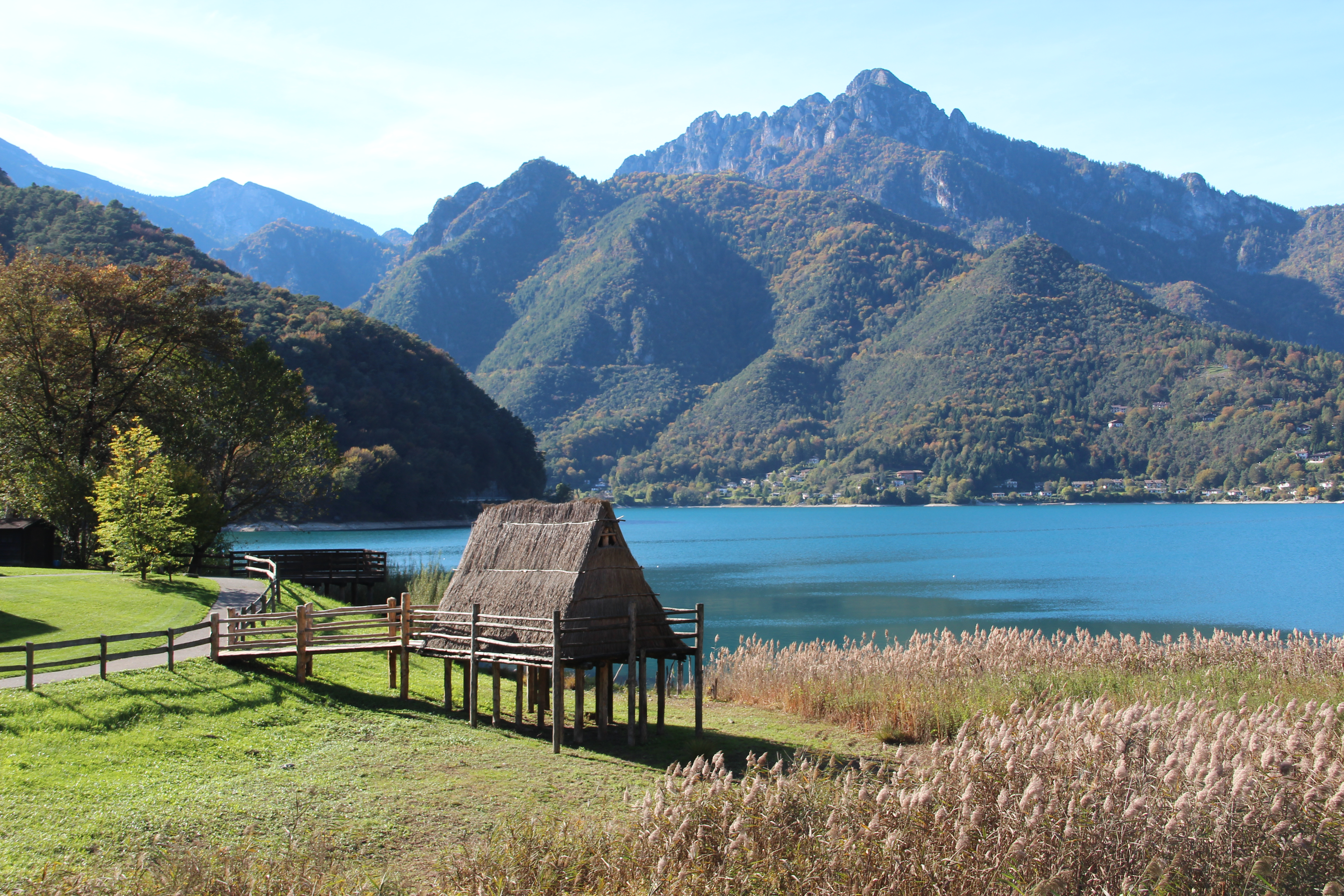
Neolithic palafitte at Ledro, Italy

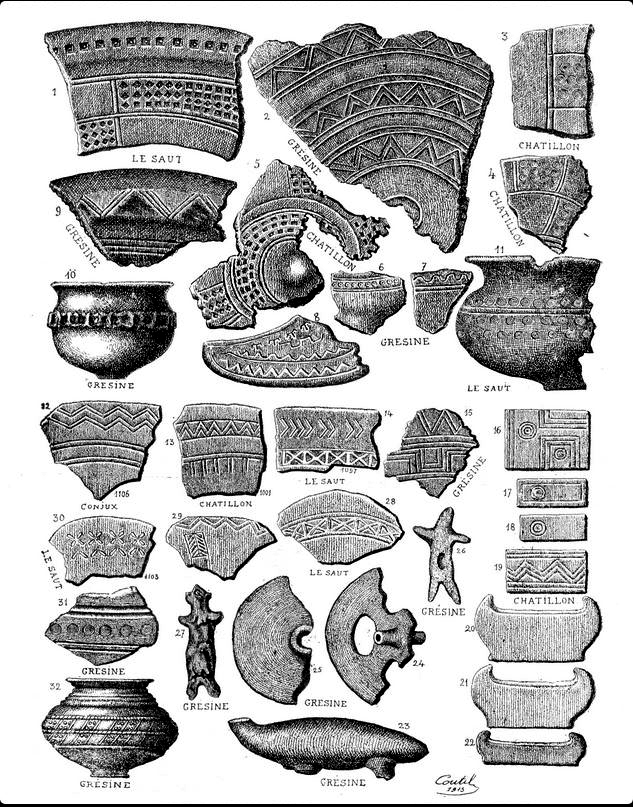
Patterns of pile dwellings ceramics, Lake Bourget, Savoy, 1915

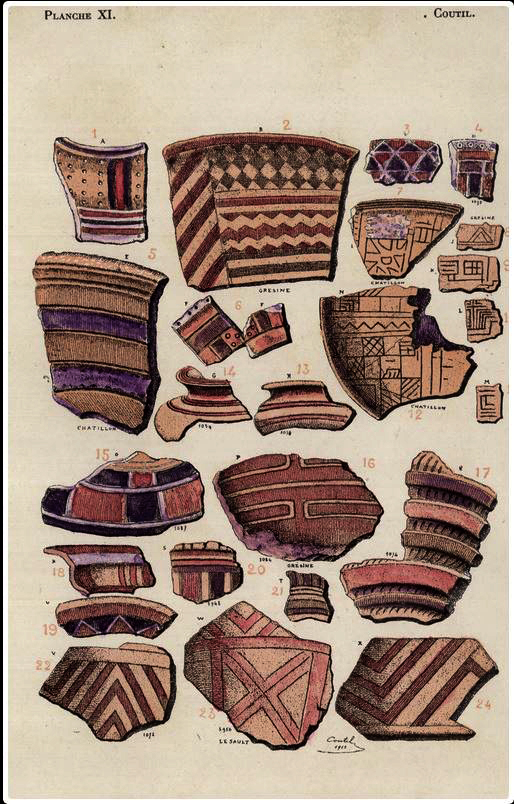
Ceramics of palafittes of Lake Bourget, Savoy, 1915

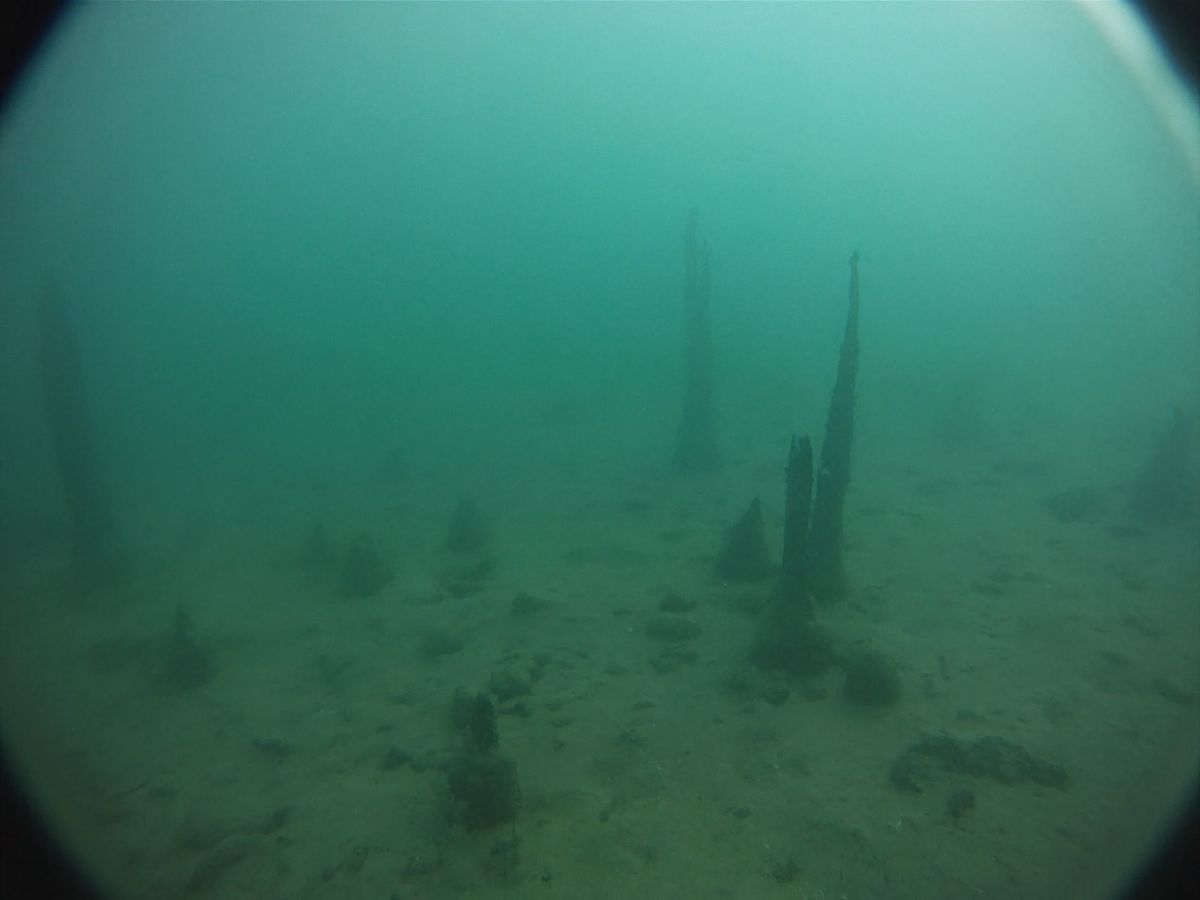
Remains of underwater palafittes, station of Morges, Switzerland, 2011

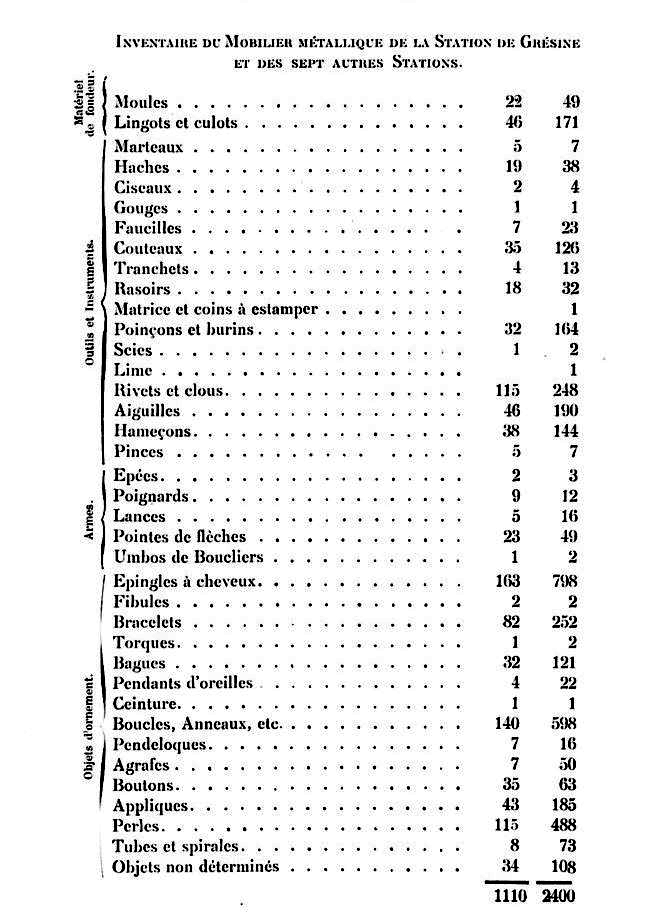
Inventory of the metallic material of the pile dwellings of Lake Bourget, 1908

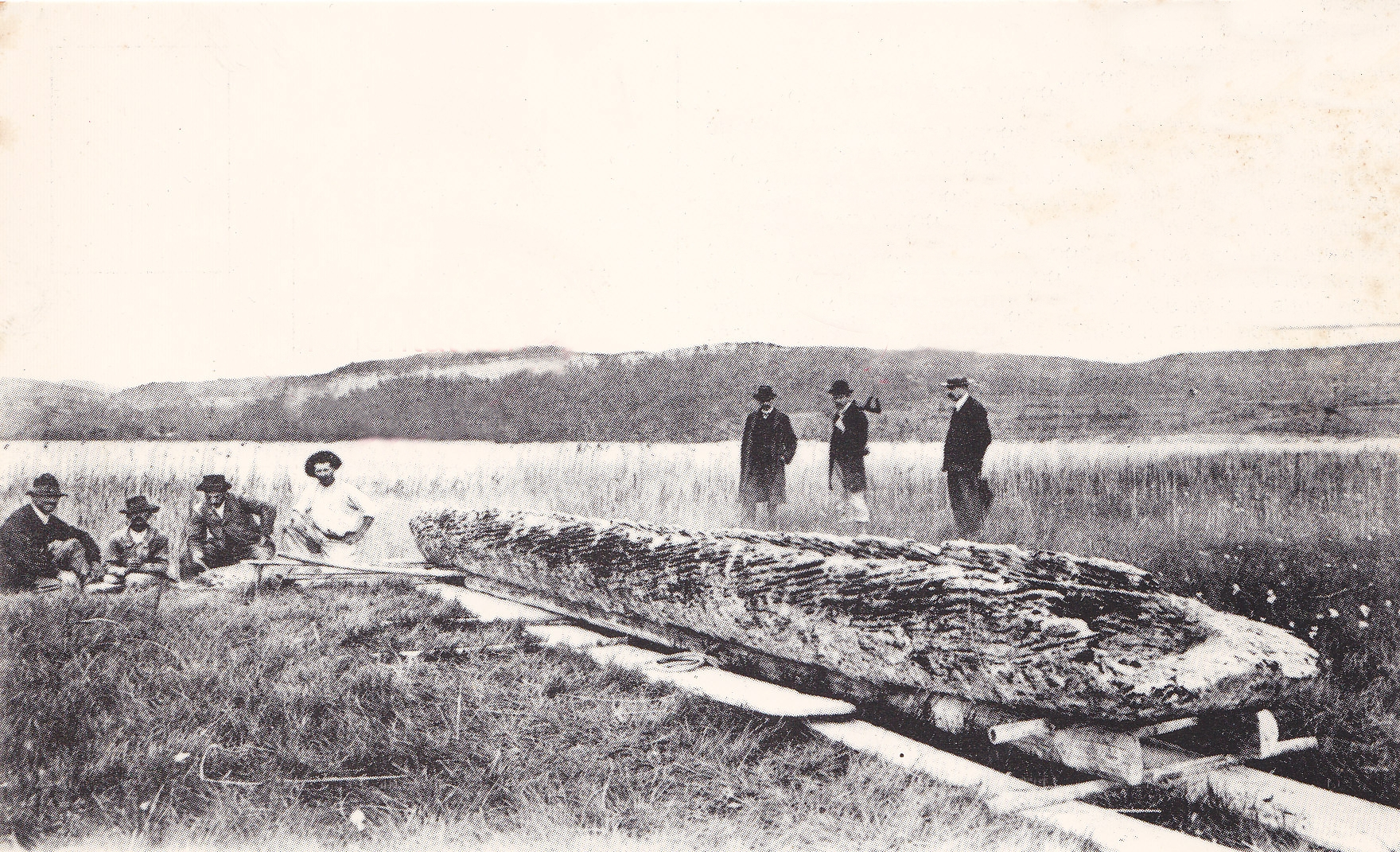
Canoe from Lake Chalain, Jura, 1904

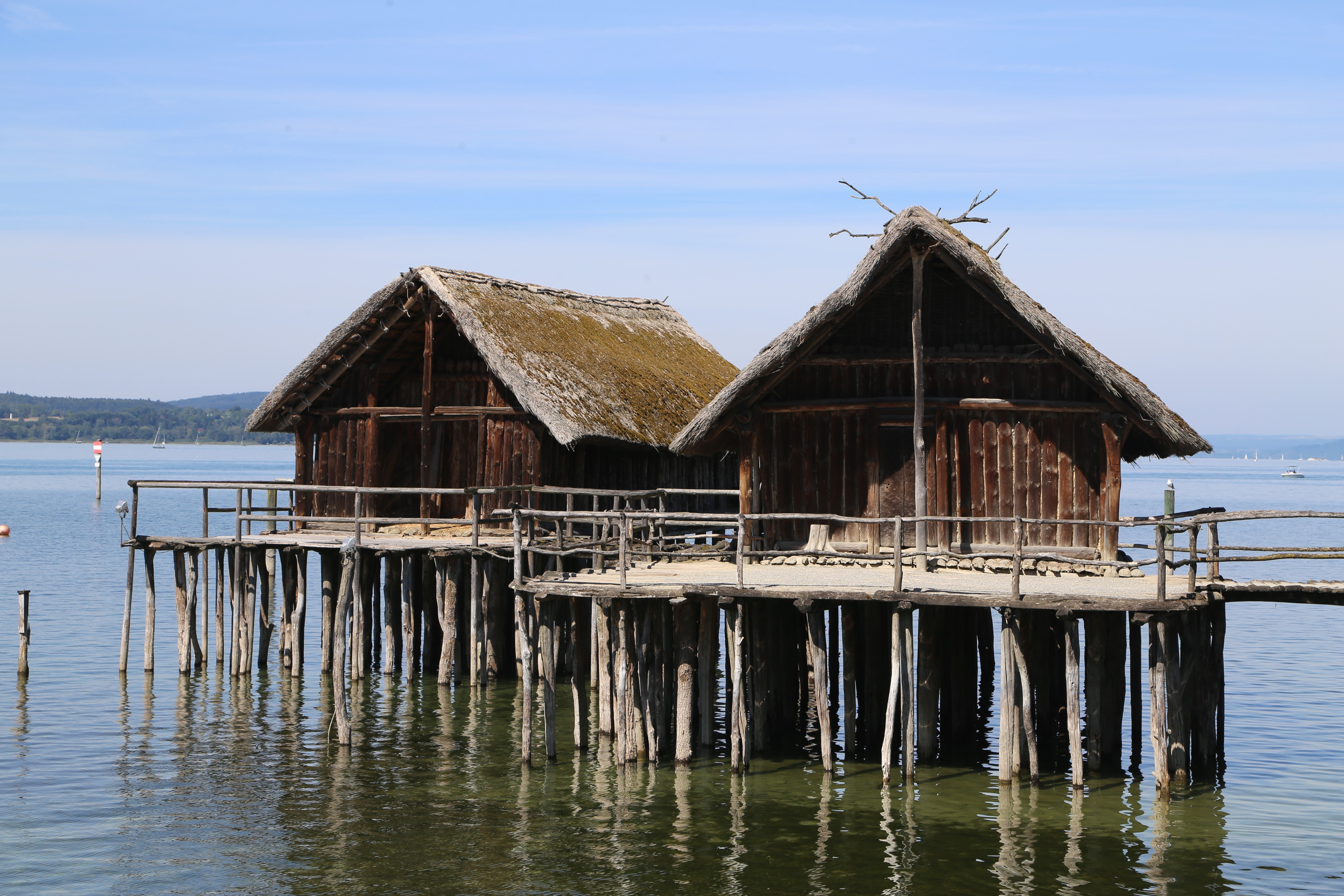
Neolithic house reconstruction

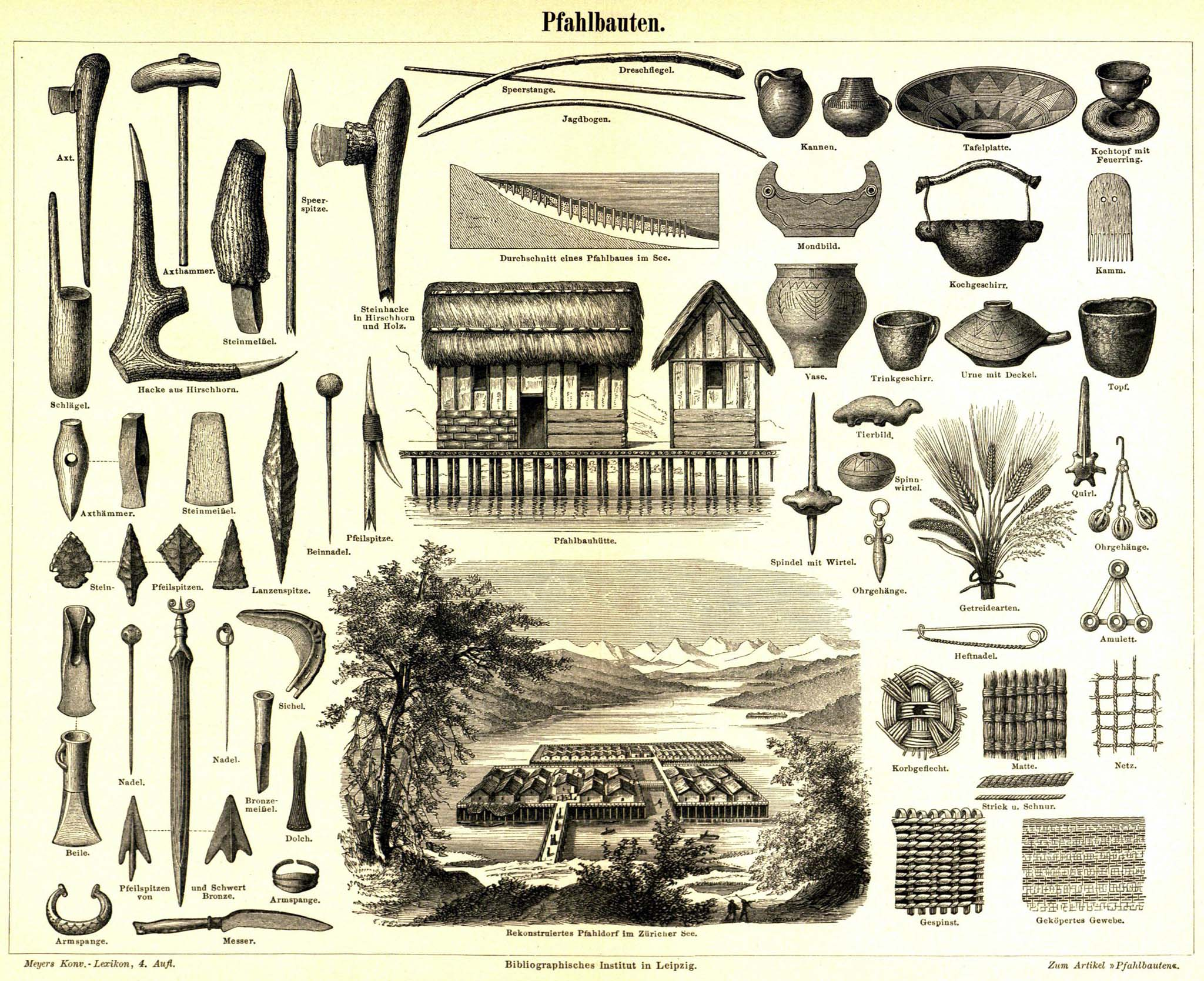
Illustration of dwellings and artefacts

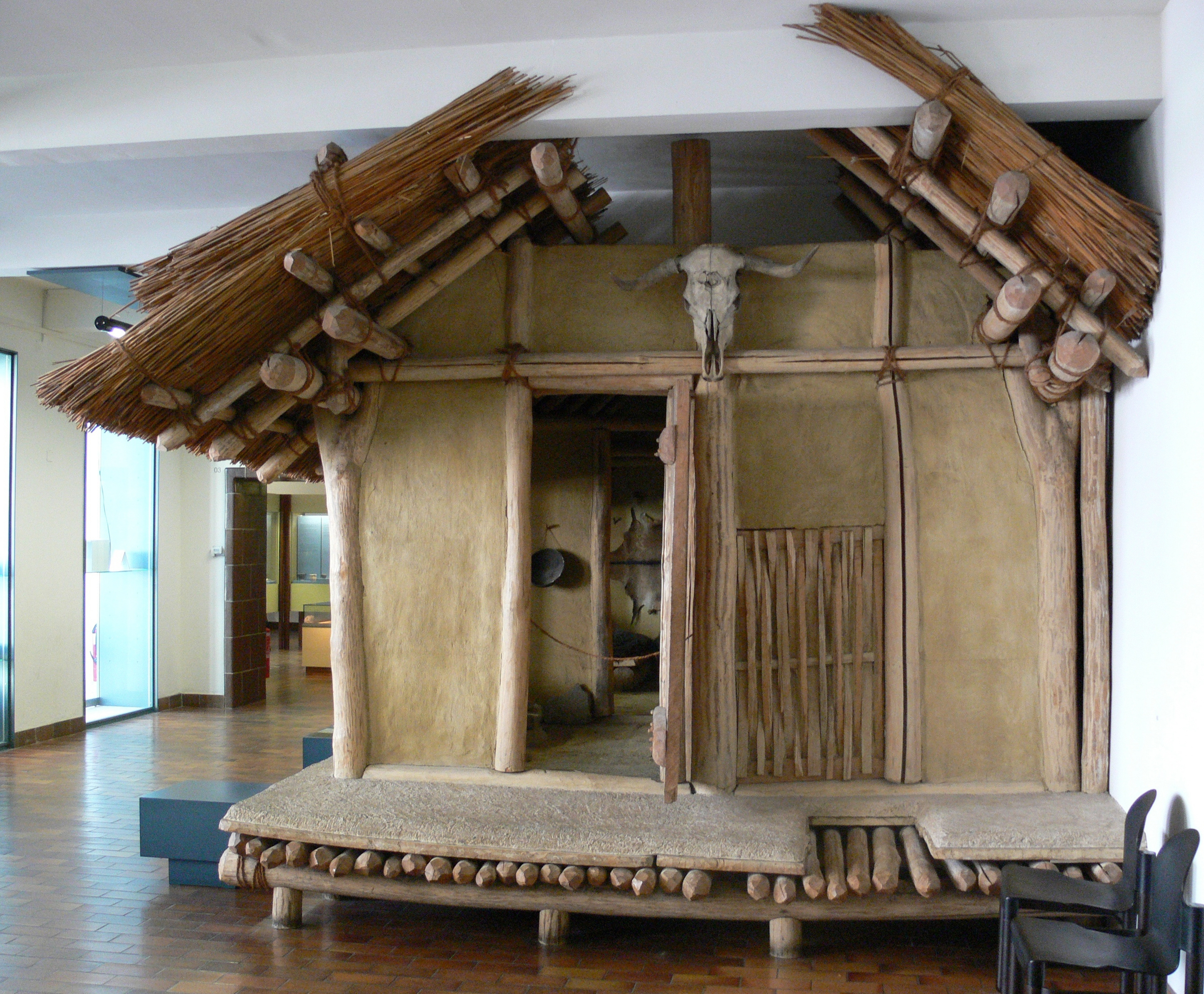
Prehistoric pile-dwelling house reconstruction

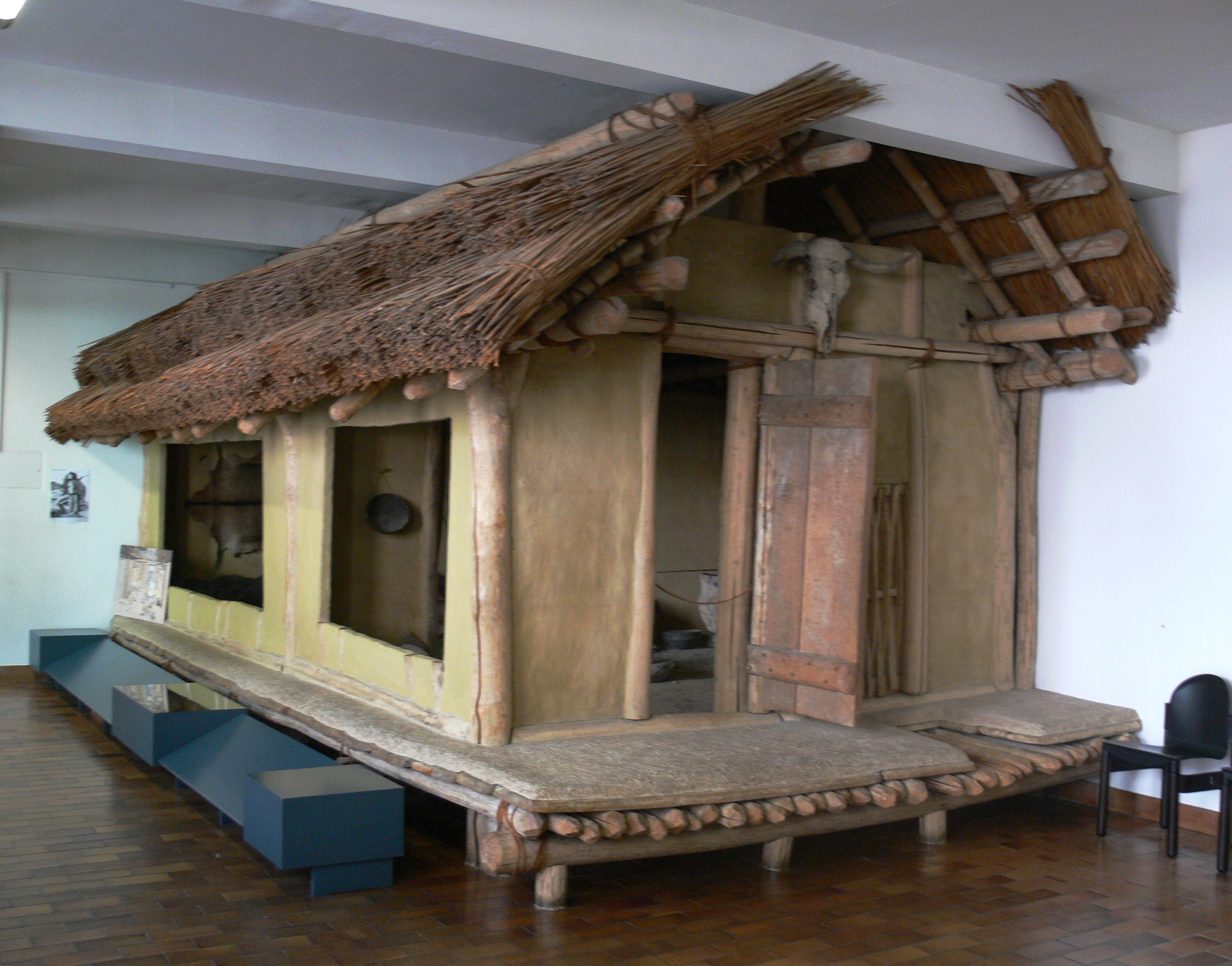
Prehistoric pile-dwelling house reconstruction

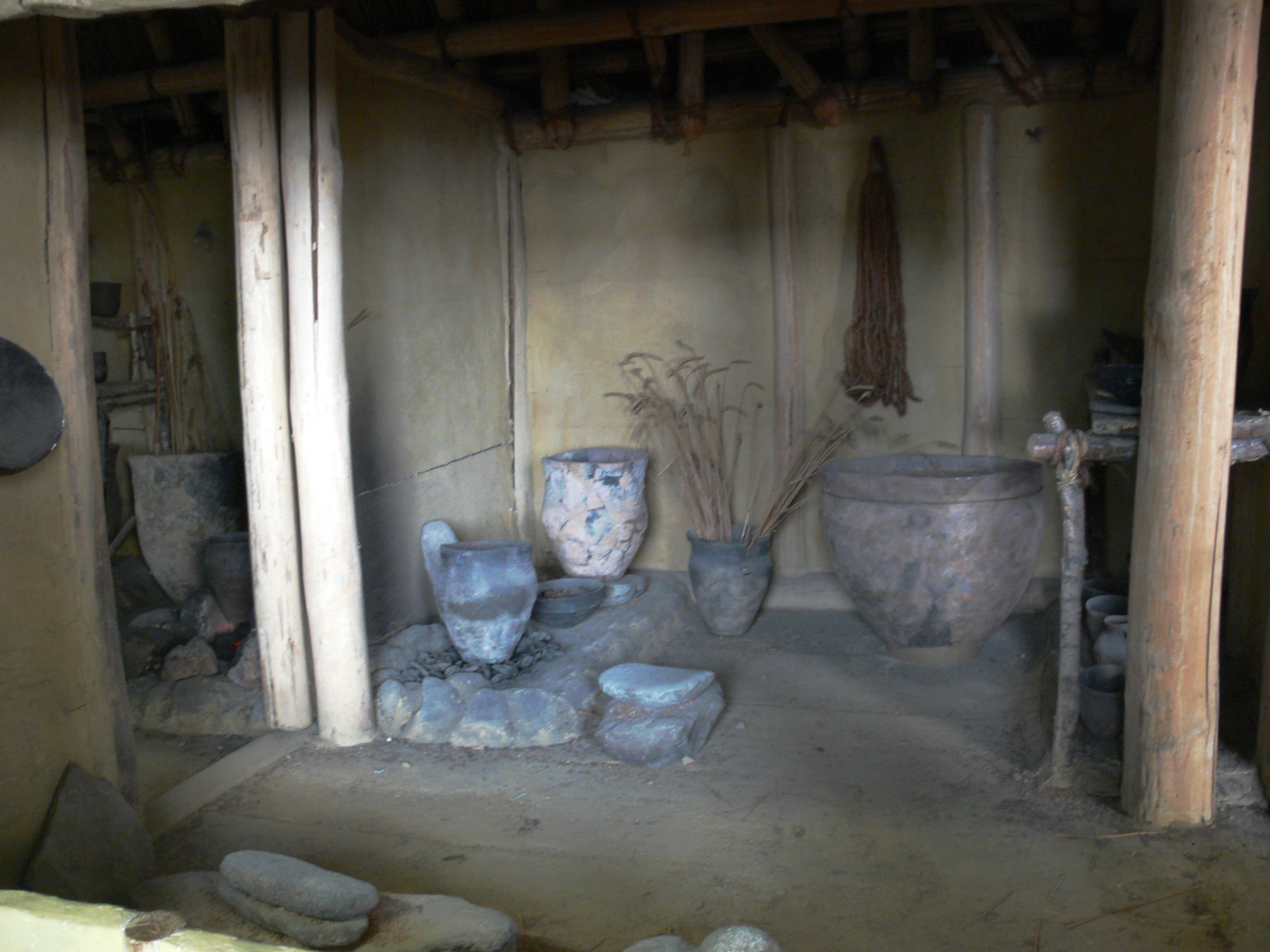
Prehistoric pile-dwelling house reconstruction

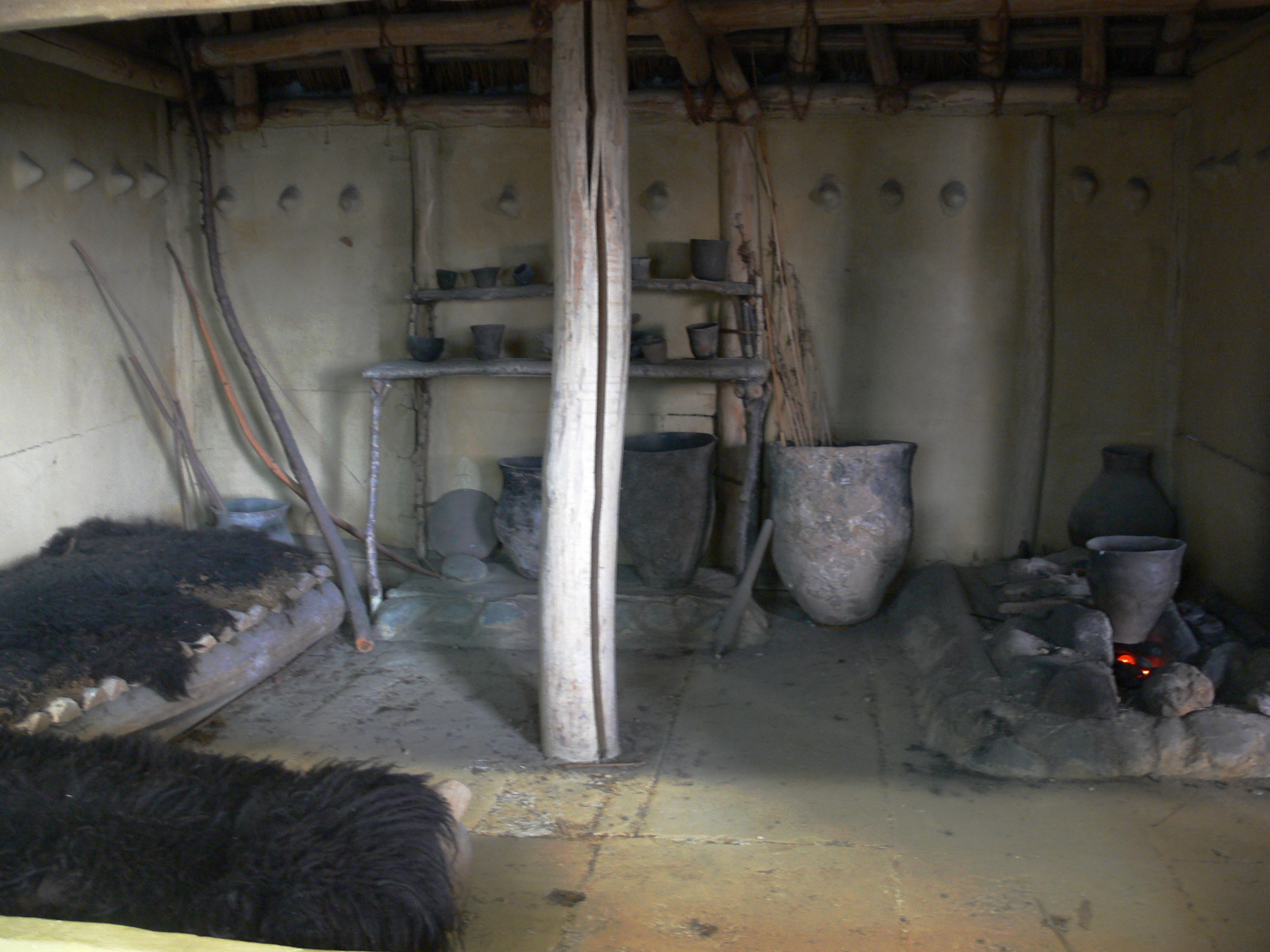
Prehistoric pile-dwelling house reconstruction

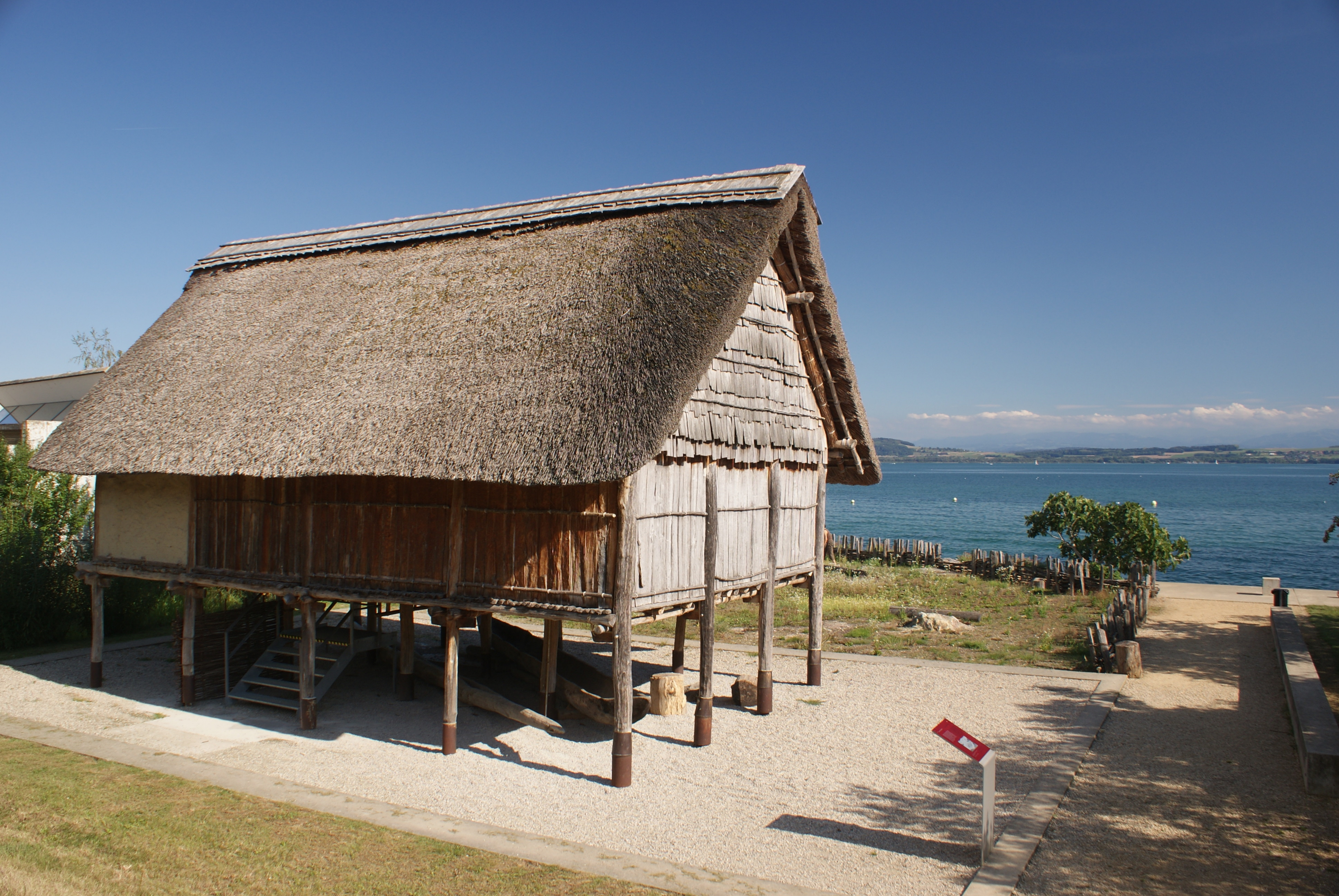
Bronze Age house reconstruction (c. 1000 BC), Laténium museum, Switzerland

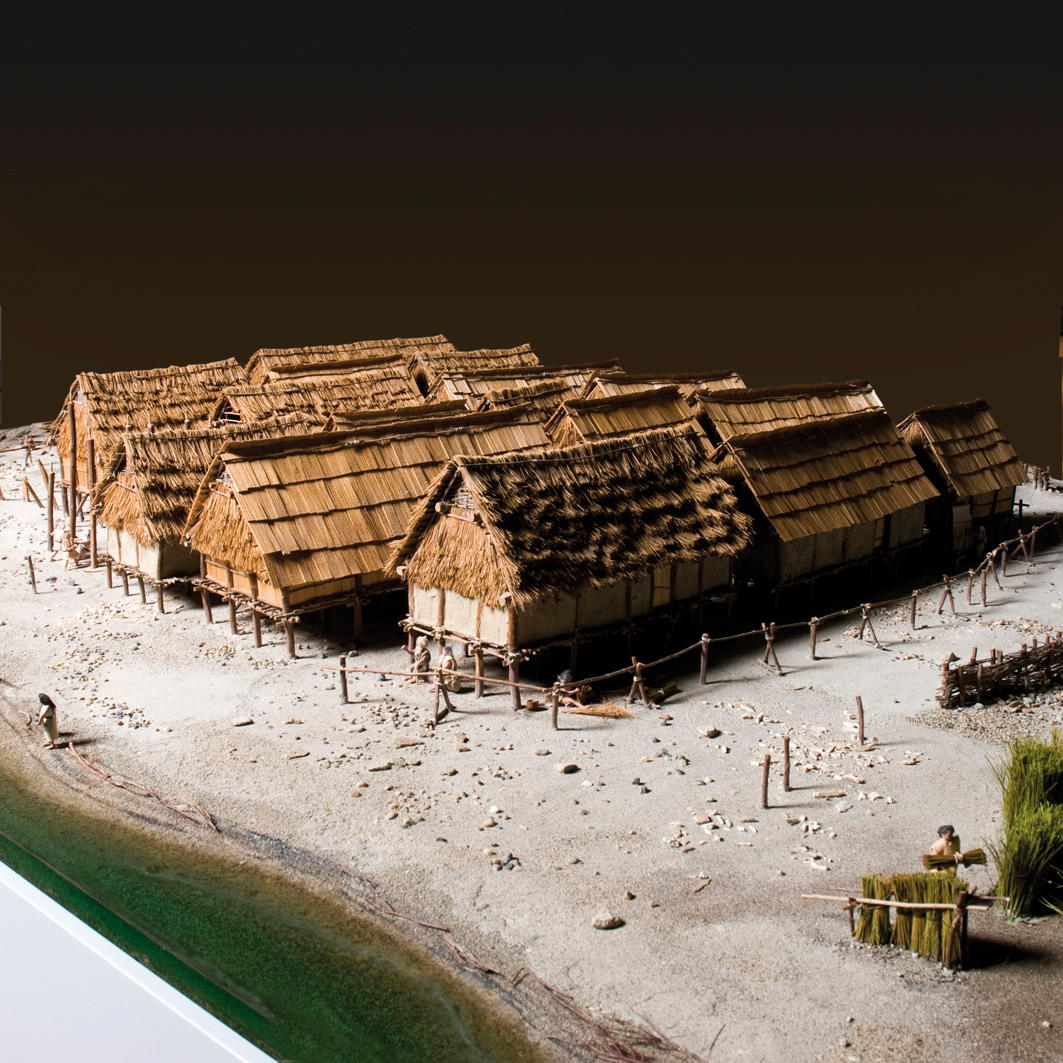
Cortaillod-Est, Bronze Age settlement, Switzerland, c. 1000 BC

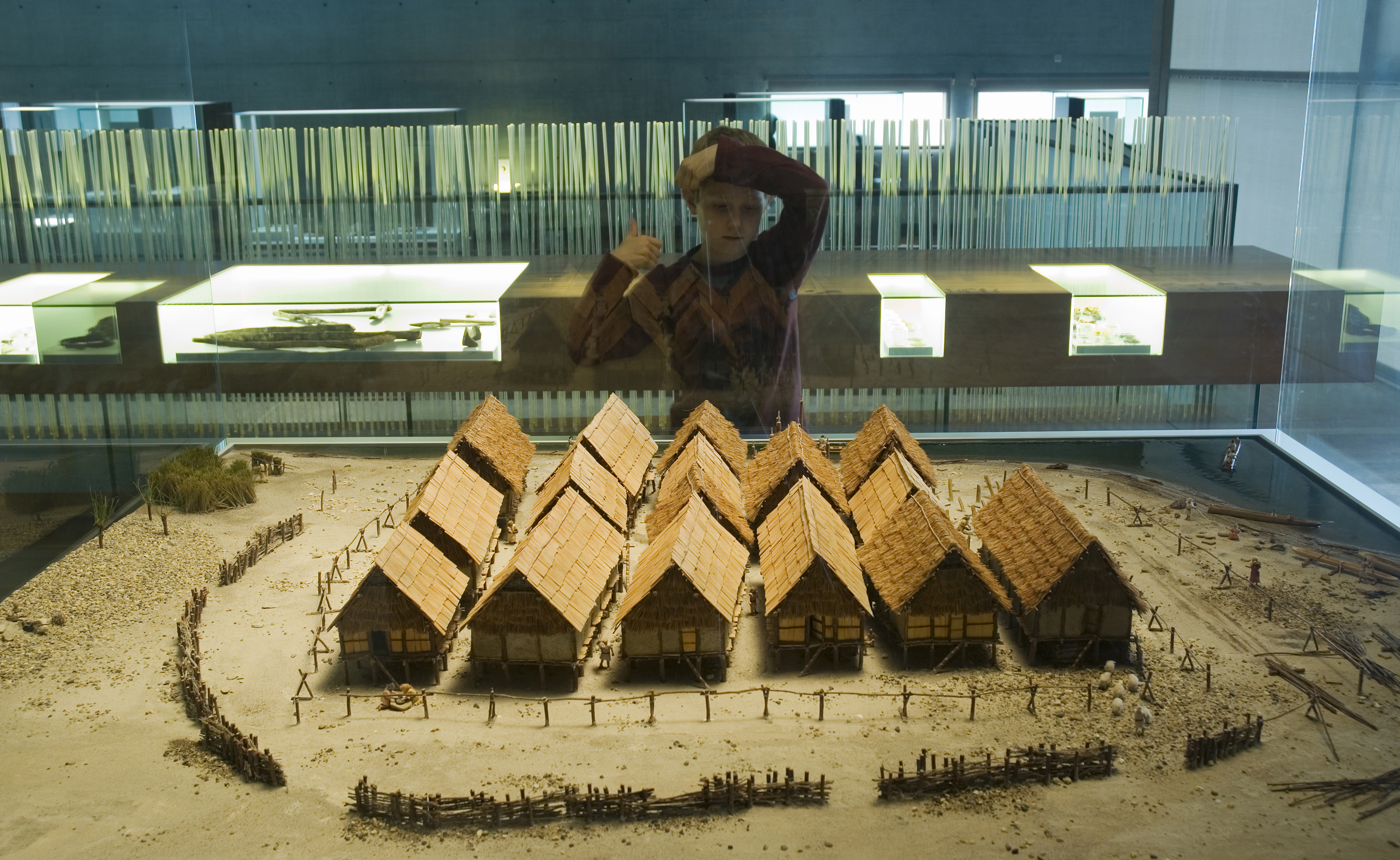
Cortaillod-Est, c. 1000 BC

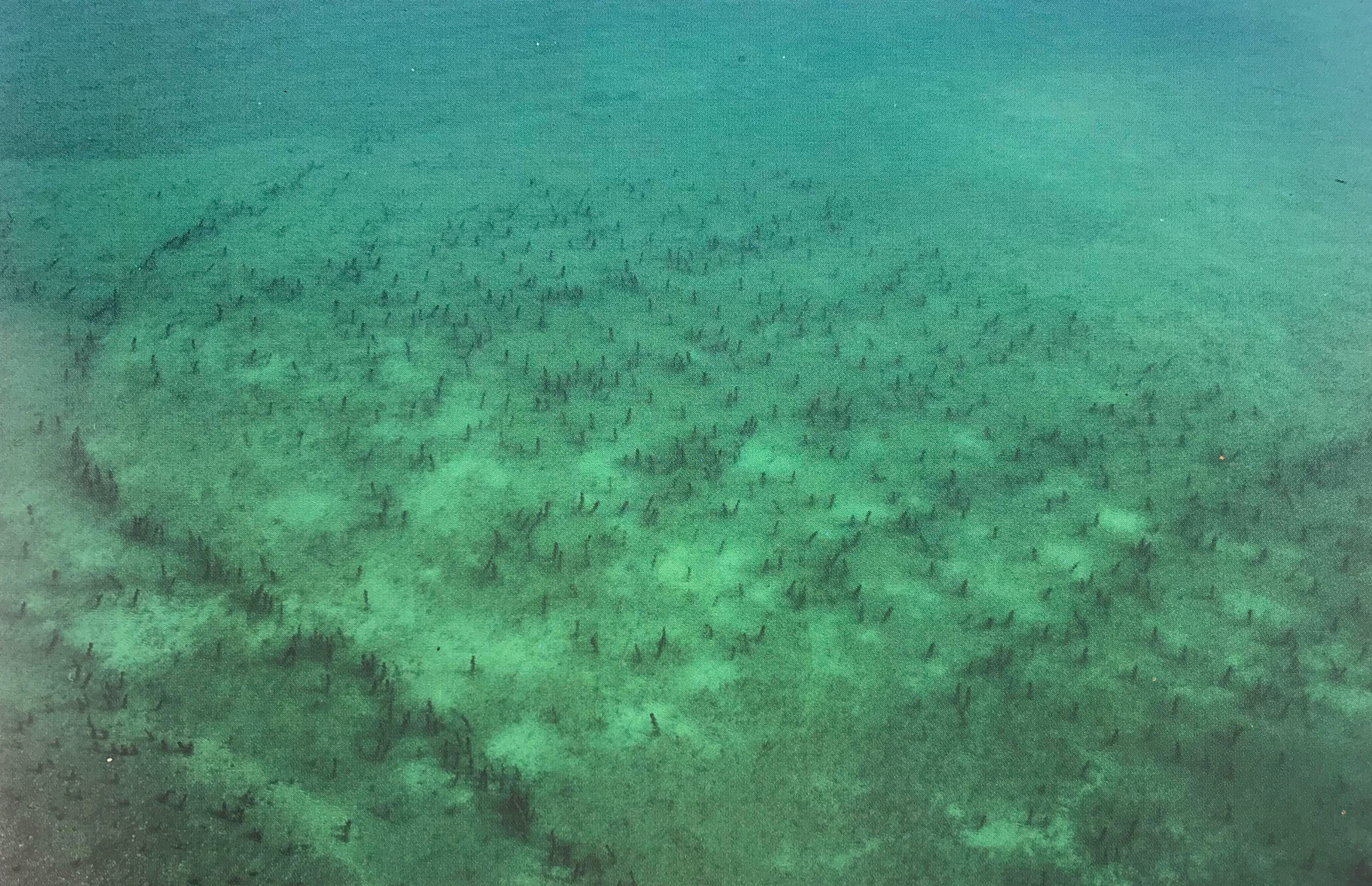
Cortaillod-Est, settlement remains

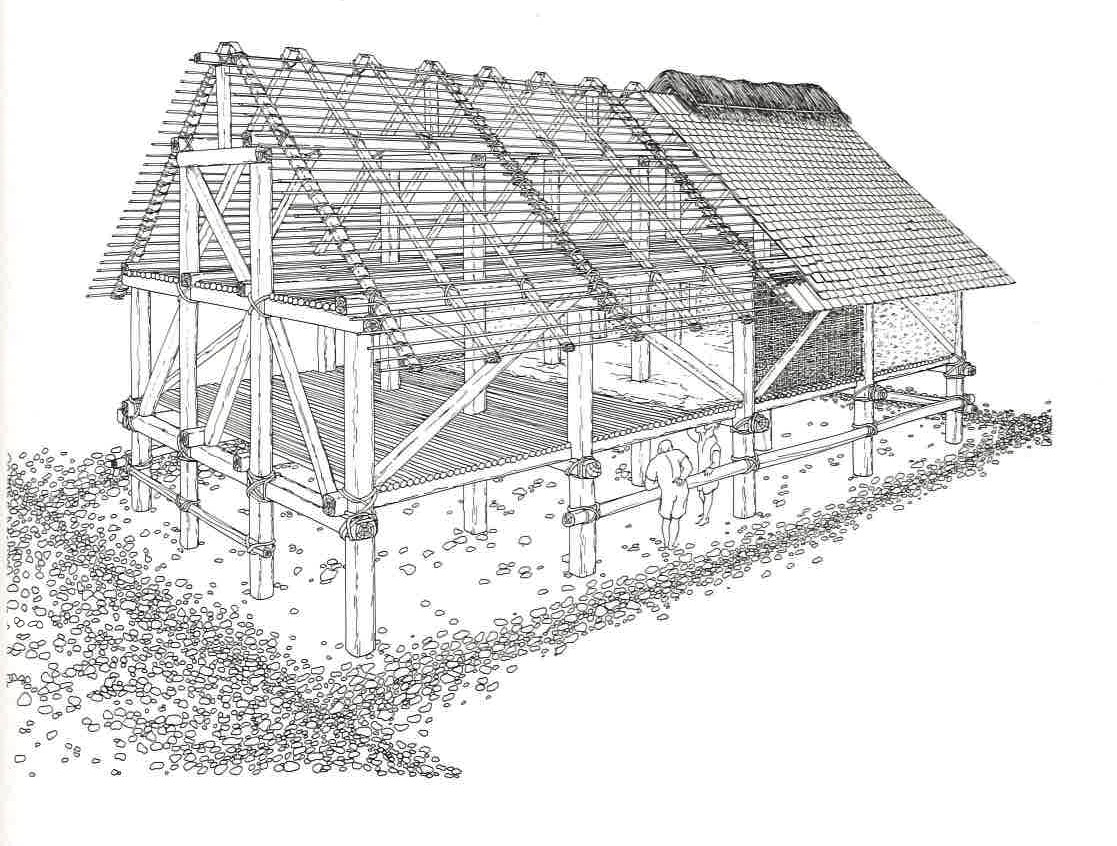
Cortaillod-Est house

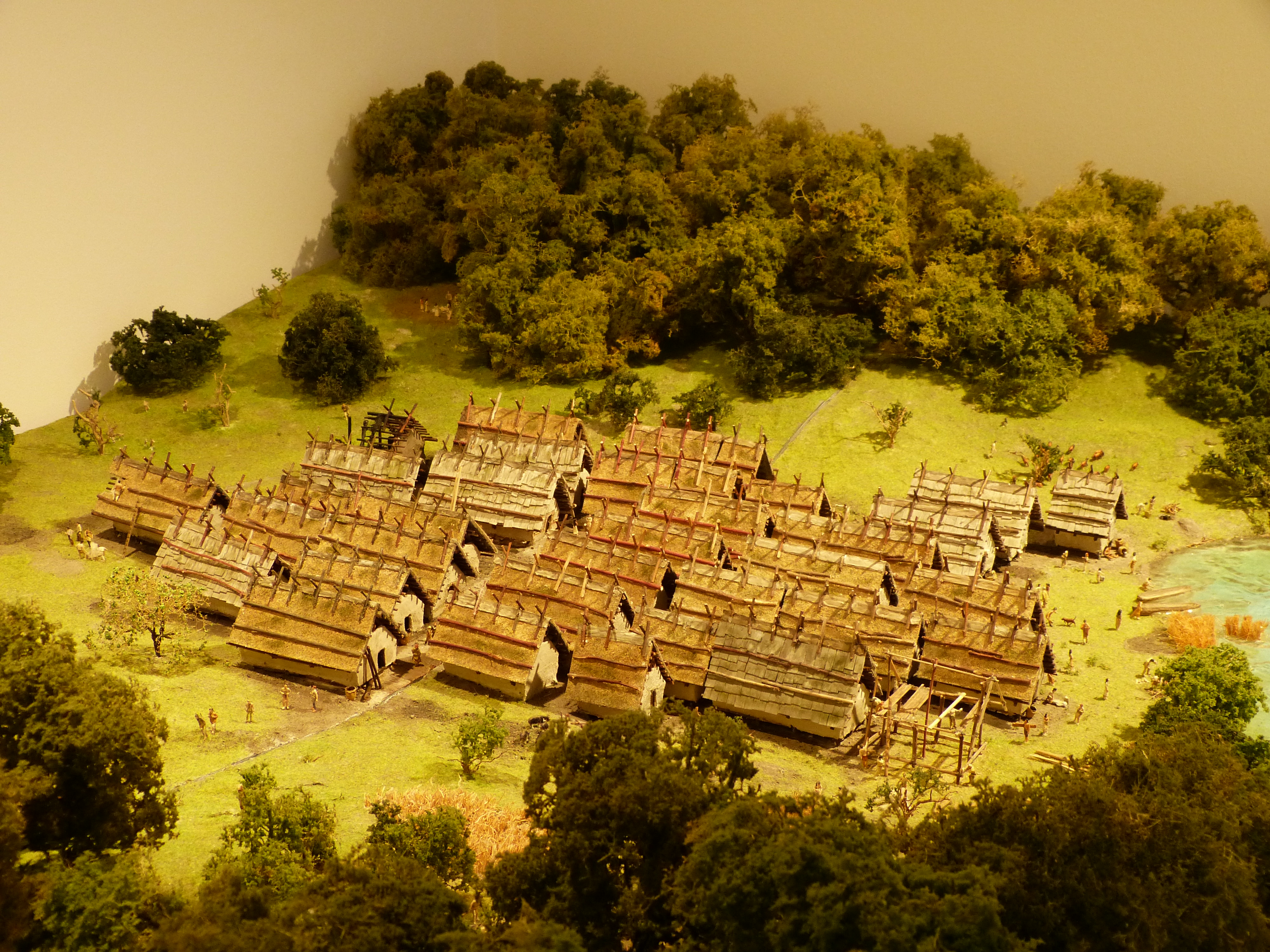
Pfyn-Breitenloo, Neolithic settlement, c. 3700 BC, Pfyn culture, Switzerland

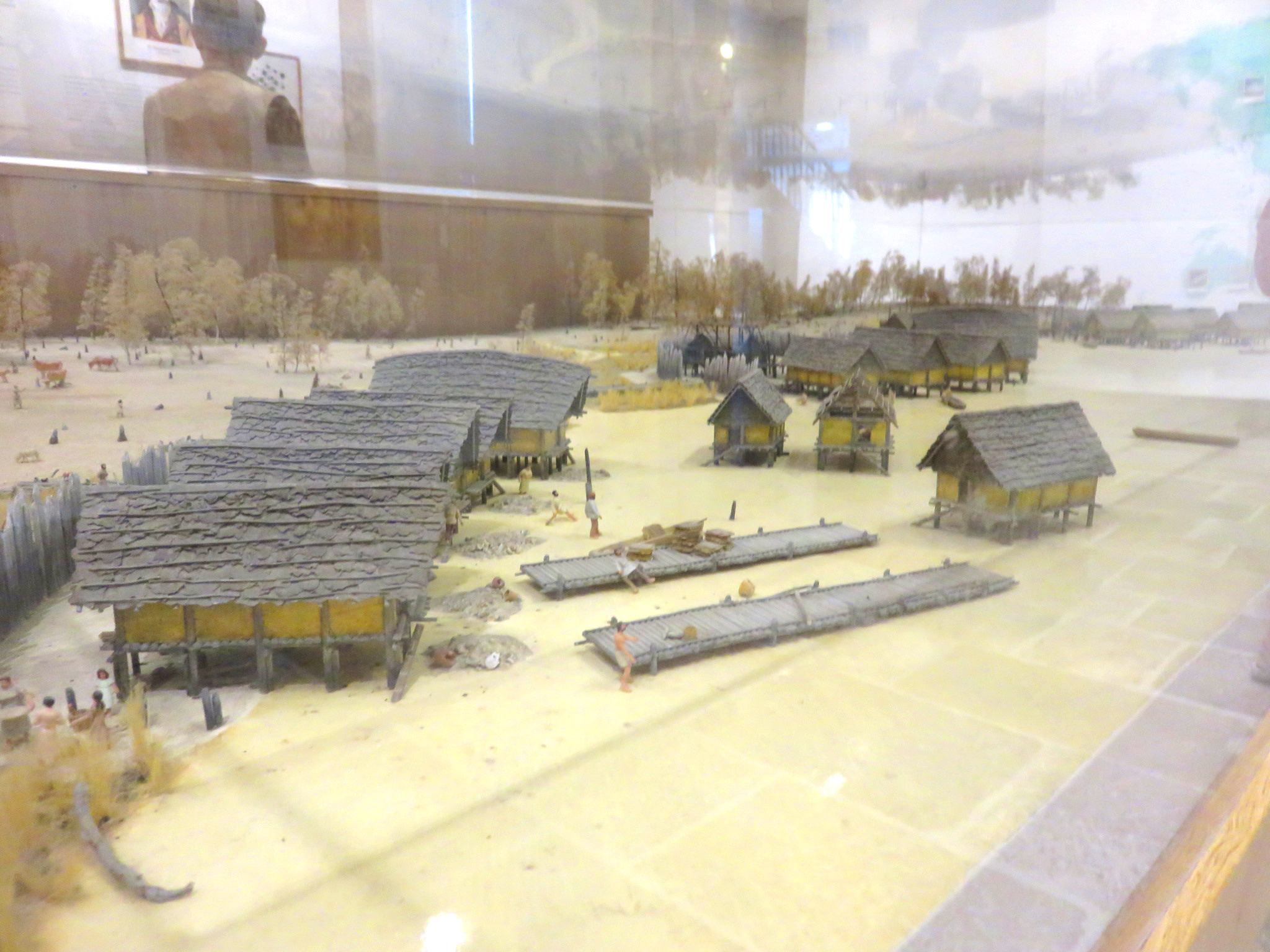
Clairvaux-les-Lacs, Neolithic settlement, France, c. 4000 BC

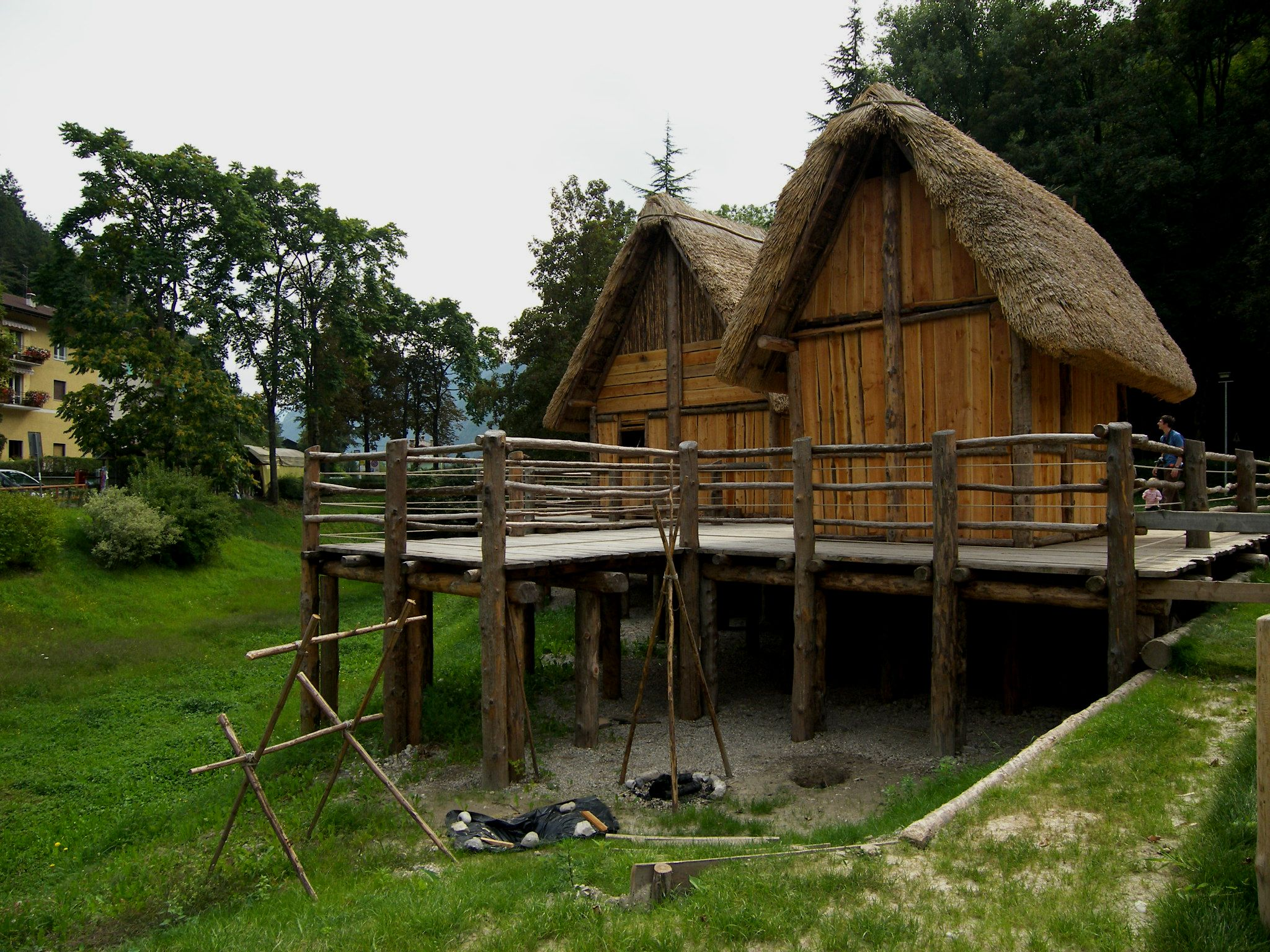
Molina di Ledro, Bronze Age settlement, Italy, Polada culture, c. 2200–1500 BC

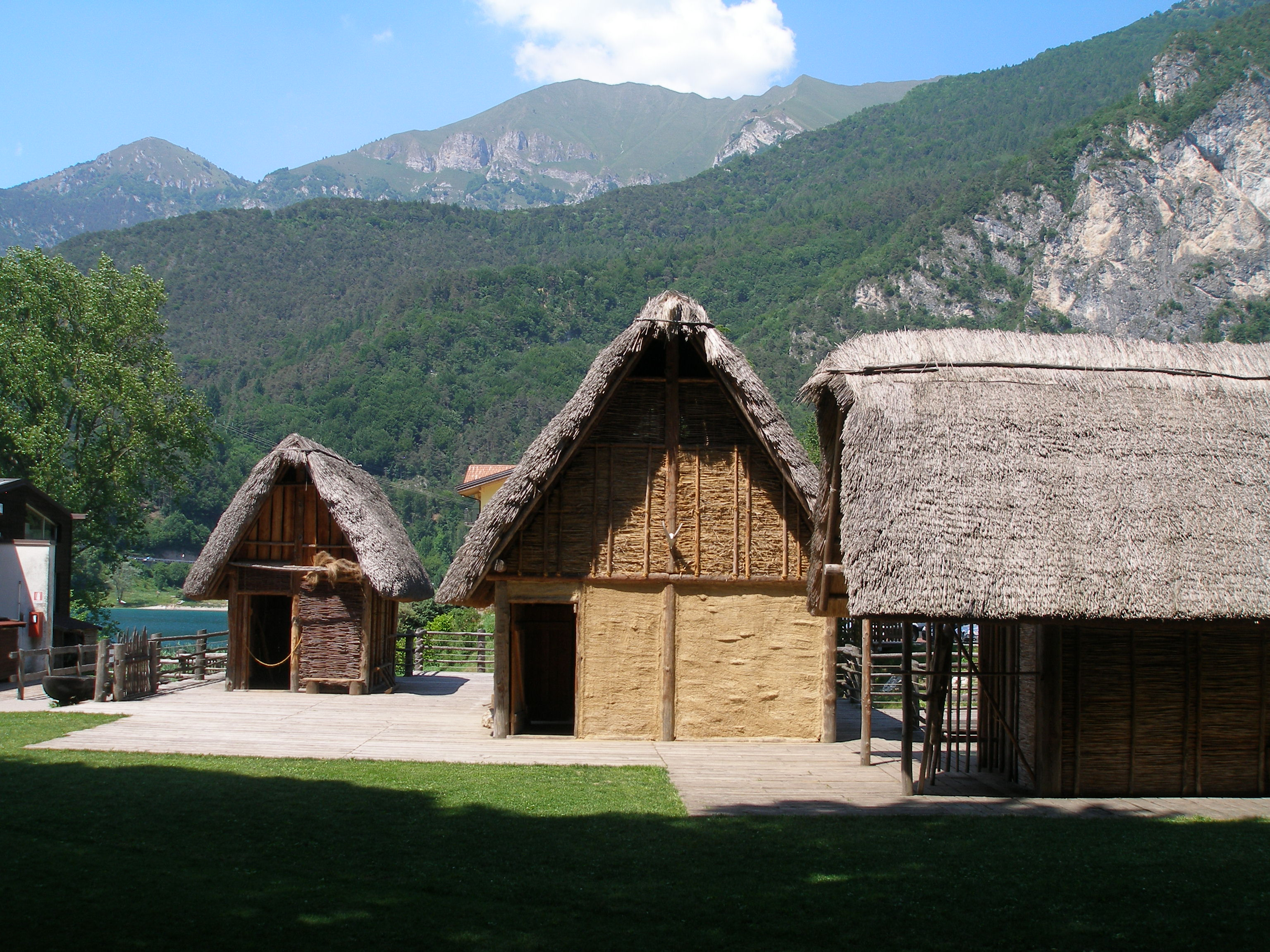
Molina di Ledro, Bronze Age settlement reconstruction

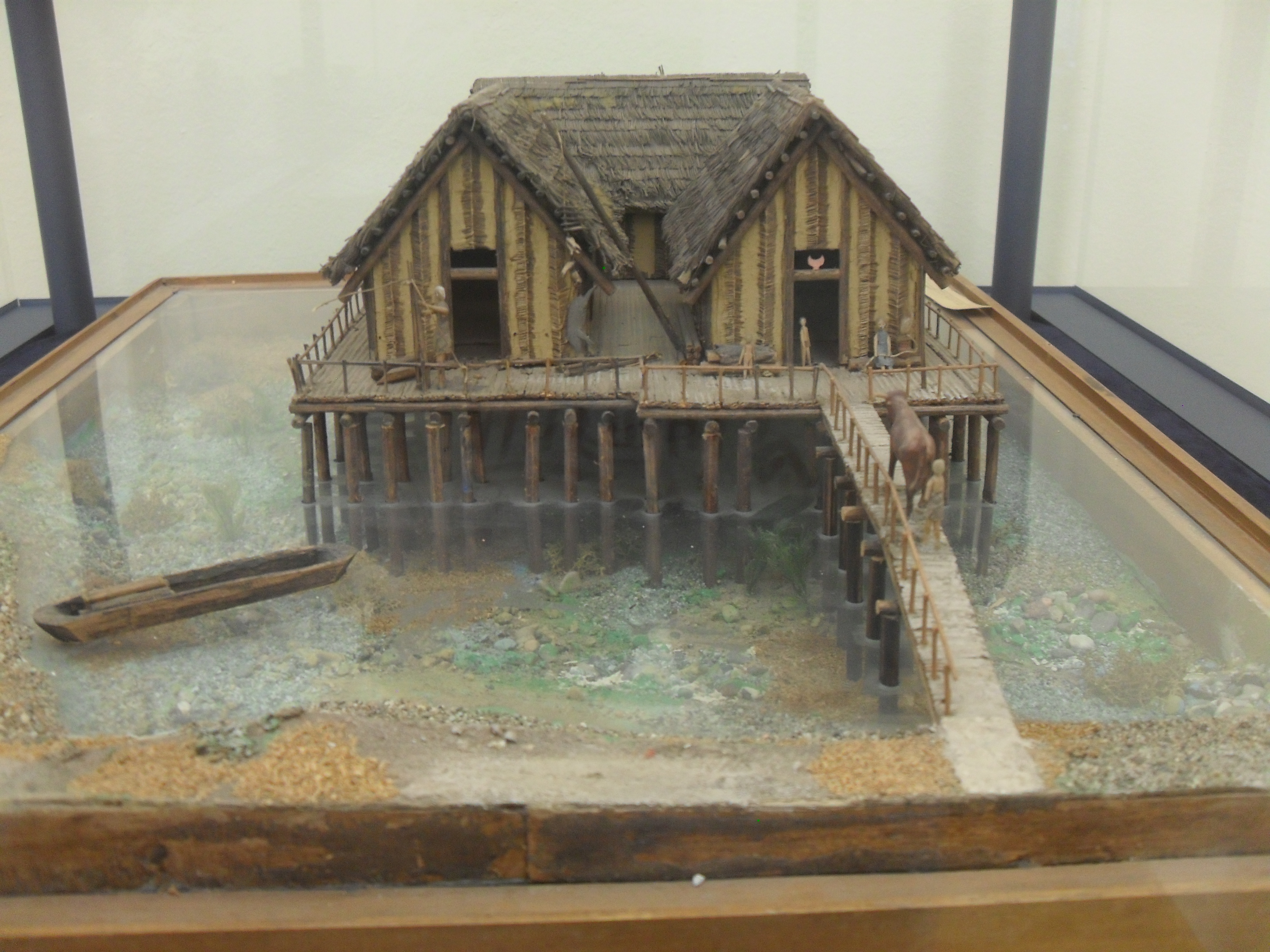
Palafitte model, Museo di Villa Mirabello

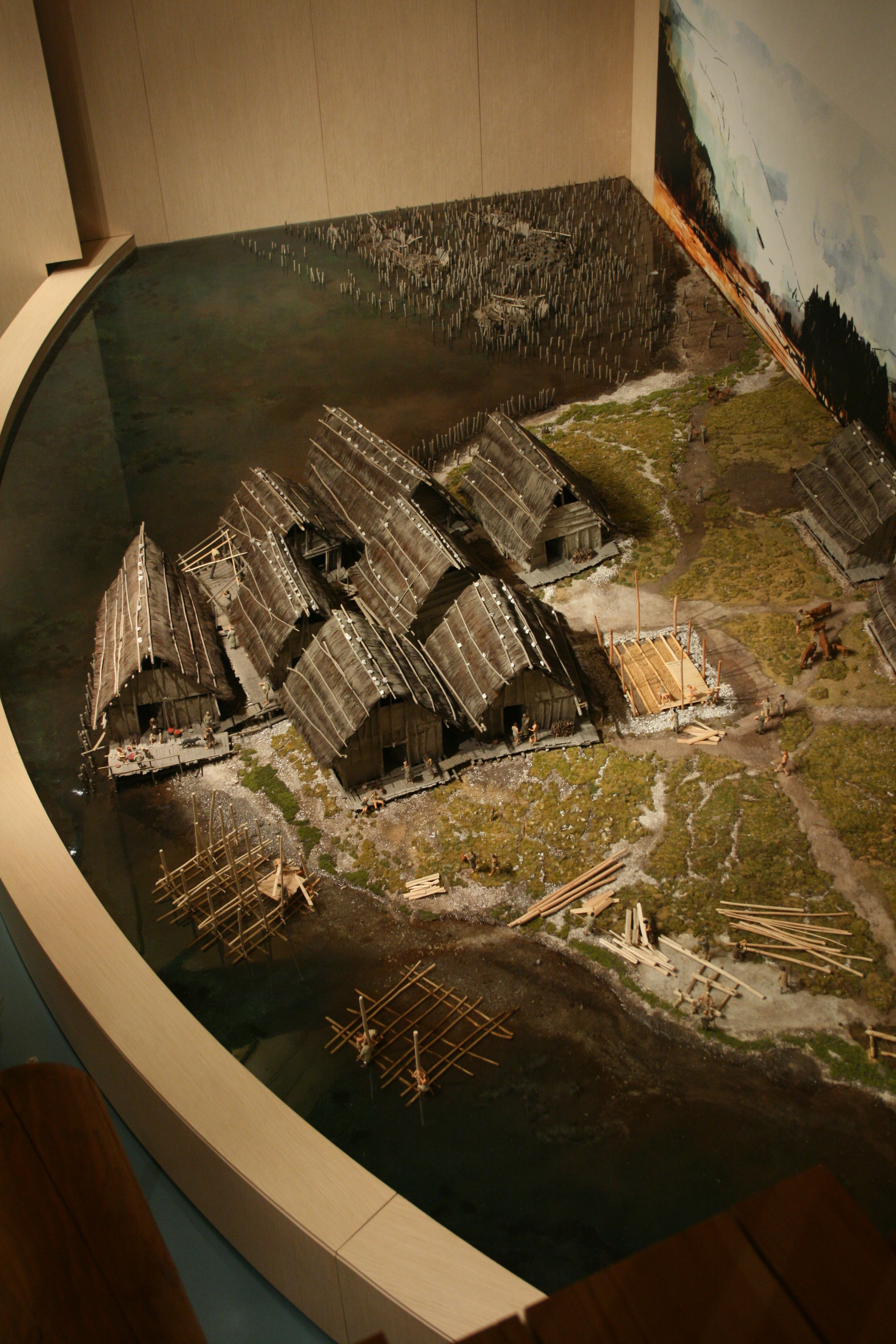
Fiave 6, Facies of the pile dwellings and of the dammed settlements, Italy

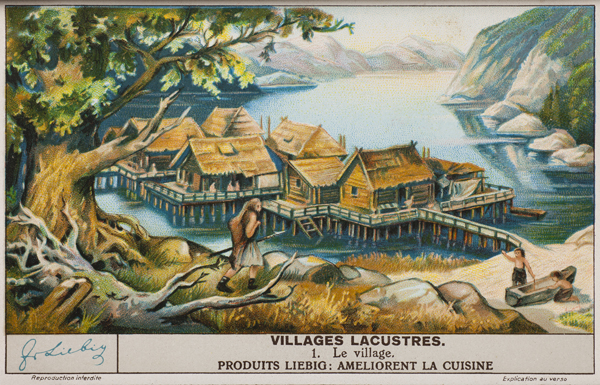
Historical illustration

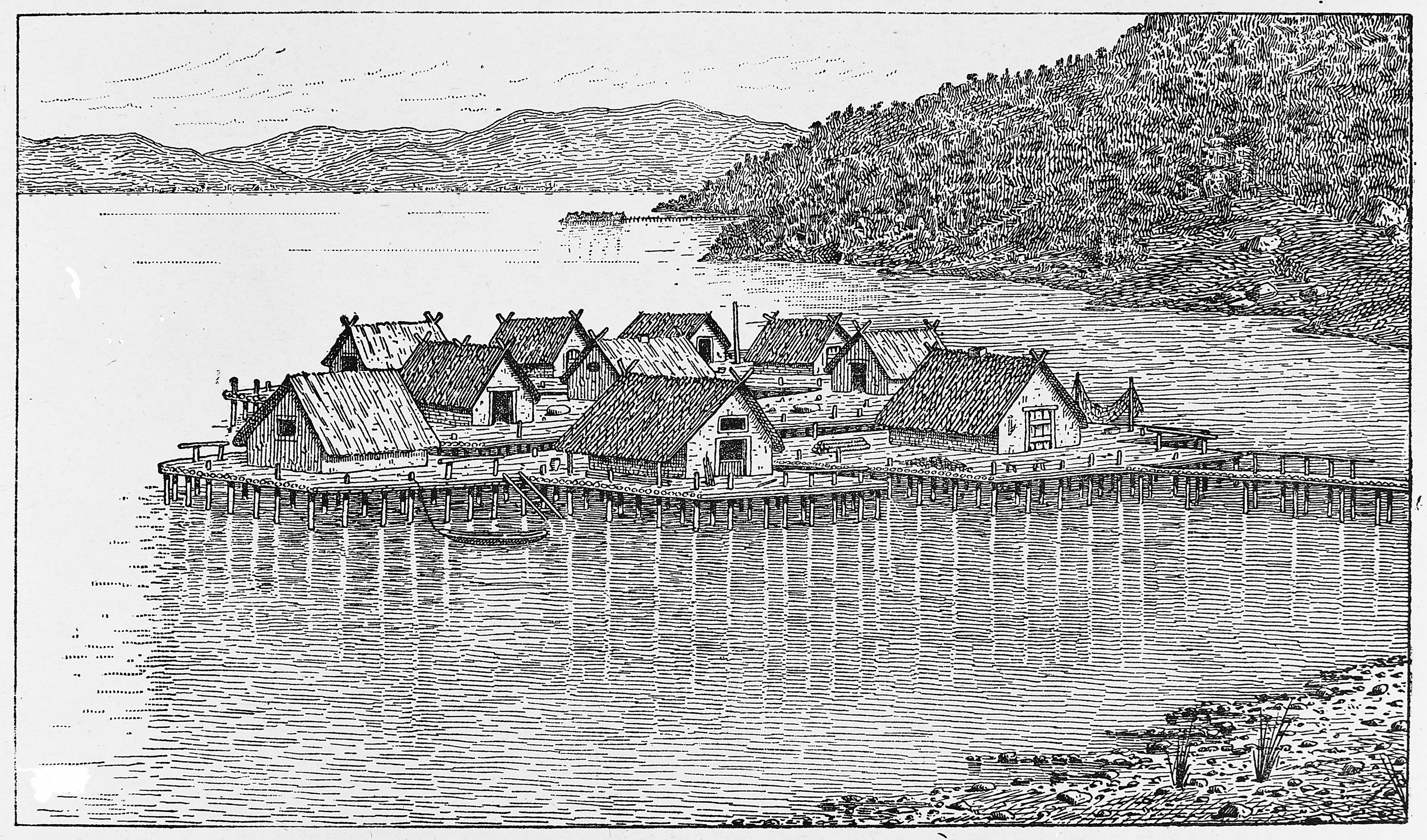
Illustration of a lake settlement in Switzerland

== See also ==
- Prehistoric pile dwellings around Lake Zurich
- Cortaillod culture
- Horgen culture
- Pfyn culture
- Clairvaux-les-Lacs
- Rumah adat
