= Môtiers NE railway station =

Railway station in Val-de-Travers, Switzerland

Môtiers NE
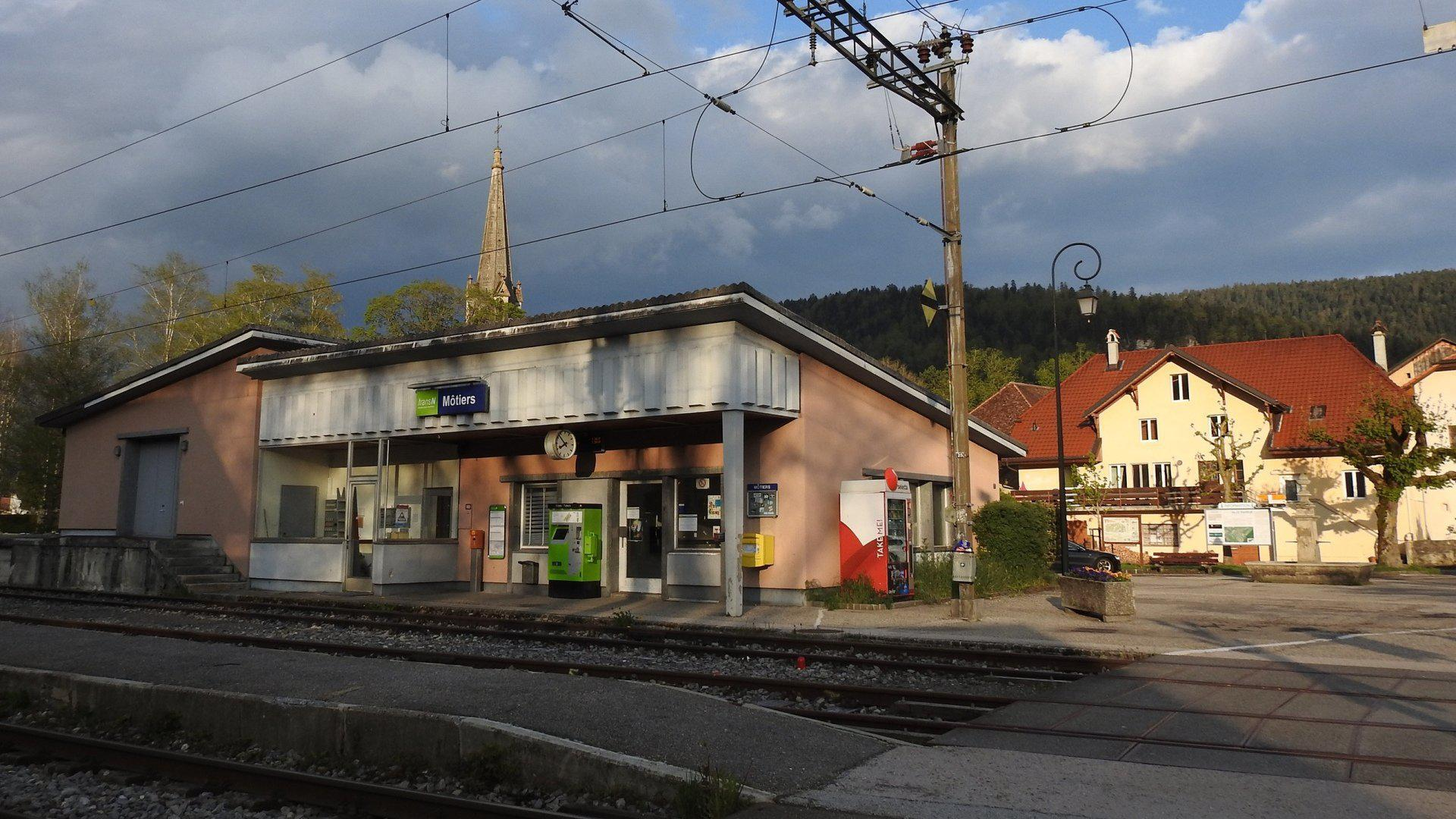
- The station in 2019

General information
- Location: Val-de-Travers; Switzerland
- Coordinates: 46°54′43″N 6°36′36″E
- Elevation: 735 m (2,411 ft)
- Owner: Transports publics Neuchâtelois
- Line: Travers–Buttes line
- Distance: 6.4 km (4.0 mi) from Travers
- Platforms: 2 (1 island platform)
- Tracks: 2
- Train operators: Transports publics Neuchâtelois

Construction
- Accessible: No

Other information
- Station code: 8504286 (MOT)
- Fare zone: 33 (Onde Verte)

History
- Former names: Môtiers (until 2020)

Services
Preceding station	Transports publics Neuchâtelois	Following station
Fleurier towards Buttes	R21	Couvet towards Neuchâtel
Location
- Location within Switzerland Location within Canton of Neuchâtel

Môtiers NE railway station (French: Gare de Môtiers NE) is a railway station in the municipality of Val-de-Travers, in the Swiss canton of Neuchâtel. It is an intermediate stop on the standard gauge Travers–Buttes line of Transports publics Neuchâtelois.

== Services ==
As of the December 2023 timetable change, the following services stop at Môtiers NE:

- Regio: half-hourly service between Neuchâtel and Buttes.
