= Couvet railway station =

Railway station in Val-de-Travers, Switzerland

Couvet
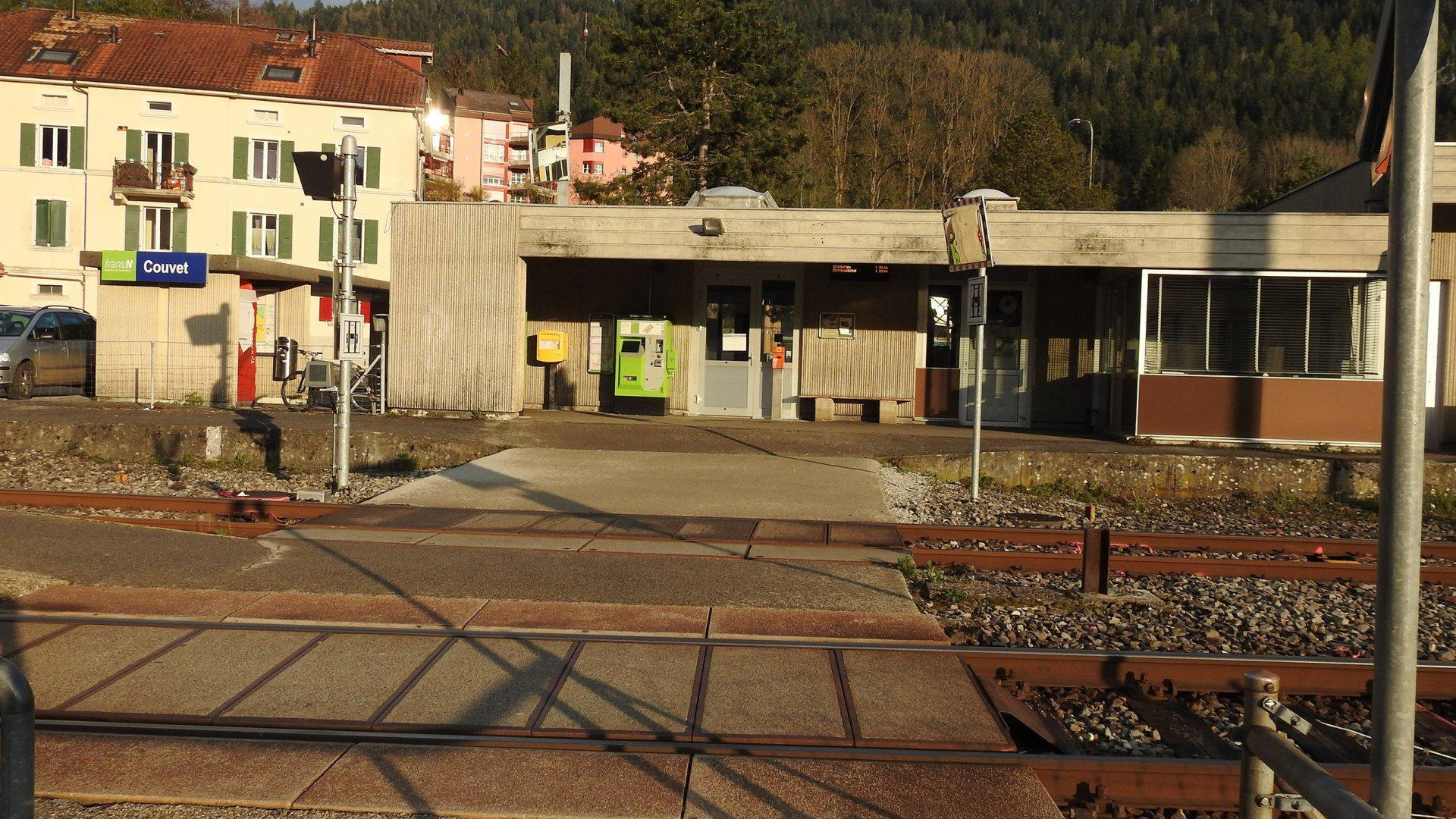
- The station building in 2019

General information
- Location: Val-de-Travers; Switzerland
- Coordinates: 46°55′23″N 6°38′10″E
- Elevation: 734 m (2,408 ft)
- Owner: Transports publics Neuchâtelois
- Line: Travers–Buttes line
- Distance: 4.0 km (2.5 mi) from Travers
- Platforms: 2 (1 island platform)
- Tracks: 2
- Train operators: Transports publics Neuchâtelois
- Connections: CarPostal SA buses

Construction
- Accessible: No

Other information
- Station code: 8504285 (CVTR)
- Fare zone: 33 (Onde Verte)

Services
Preceding station	Transports publics Neuchâtelois	Following station
Môtiers NE towards Buttes	R21	La Presta Mines d'asphalte towards Neuchâtel
Location
- Location within Switzerland Location within Canton of Neuchâtel

Couvet railway station (French: Gare de Couvet) is a railway station in the municipality of Val-de-Travers, in the Swiss canton of Neuchâtel. It is an intermediate stop on the standard gauge Travers–Buttes line of Transports publics Neuchâtelois.

== Services ==
As of the December 2023 timetable change, the following services stop at Couvet:

- Regio: half-hourly service between Neuchâtel and Buttes.
