= La Presta Mines d'asphalte railway station =

Railway station in Val-de-Travers, Switzerland

La Presta Mines d'asphalte
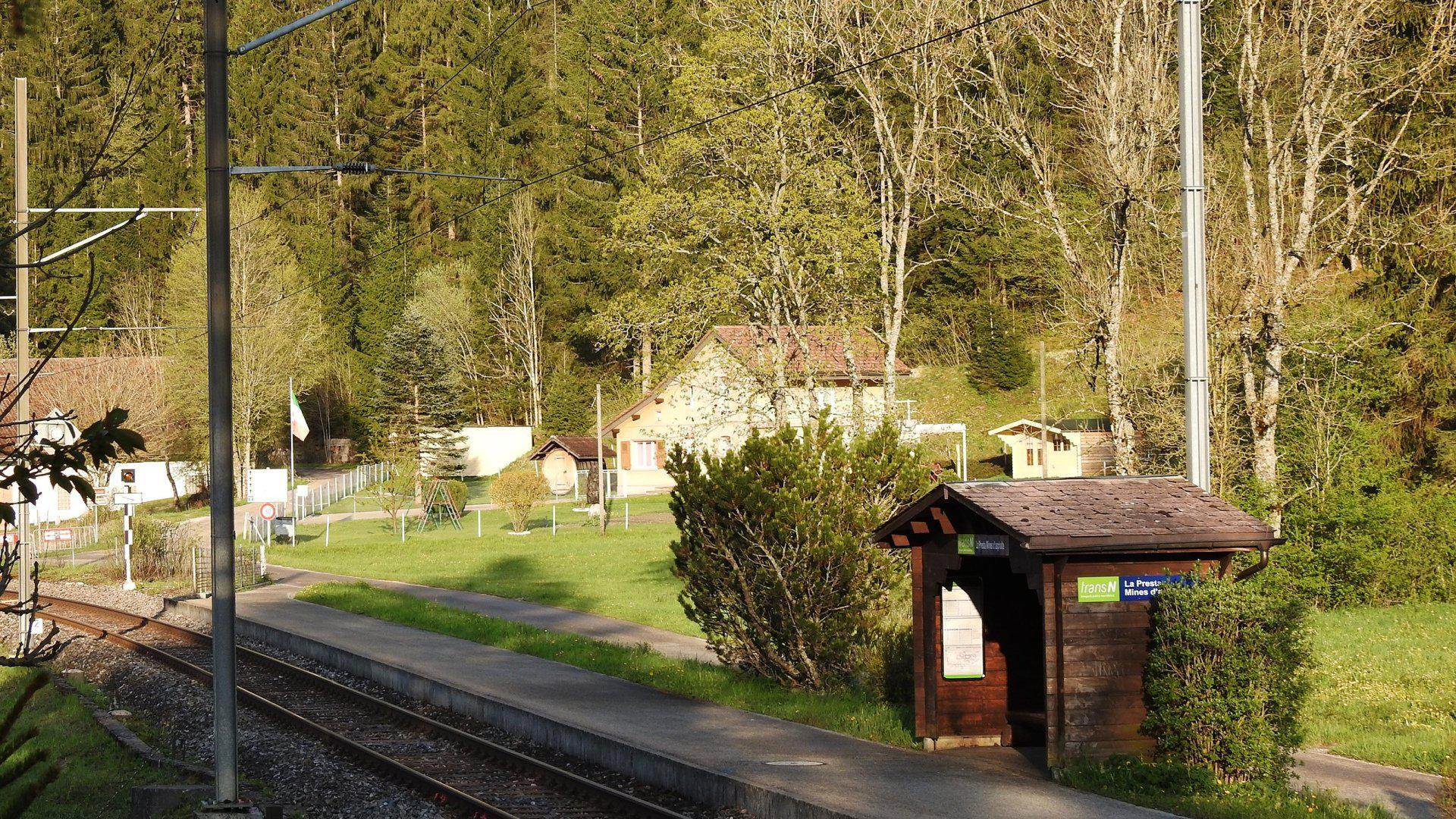
- The station in 2019

General information
- Location: Val-de-Travers; Switzerland
- Coordinates: 46°55′52″N 6°39′14″E
- Elevation: 729 m (2,392 ft)
- Owner: Transports publics Neuchâtelois
- Line: Travers–Buttes line
- Distance: 2.2 km (1.4 mi) from Travers
- Platforms: 1 side platform
- Tracks: 1
- Train operators: Transports publics Neuchâtelois

Construction
- Accessible: Yes

Other information
- Station code: 8504284 (PRST)
- Fare zone: 33 (Onde Verte)

Services
Preceding station	Transports publics Neuchâtelois	Following station
Couvet towards Buttes	R21	Travers towards Neuchâtel
Location
- Location within Switzerland Location within Canton of Neuchâtel

La Presta Mines d'asphalte railway station (French: Gare de La Presta Mines d'asphalte) is a railway station in the municipality of Val-de-Travers, in the Swiss canton of Neuchâtel. It is an intermediate stop and a request stop on the standard gauge Travers–Buttes line of Transports publics Neuchâtelois. This station is located next to the La Presta Asphalt Mine.

== Services ==
As of the December 2023 timetable change, the following services stop at La Presta Mines d'asphalte:

- Regio: half-hourly service between Neuchâtel and Buttes.
