= Fleurier railway station =

Railway station in Val-de-Travers, Switzerland

Fleurier
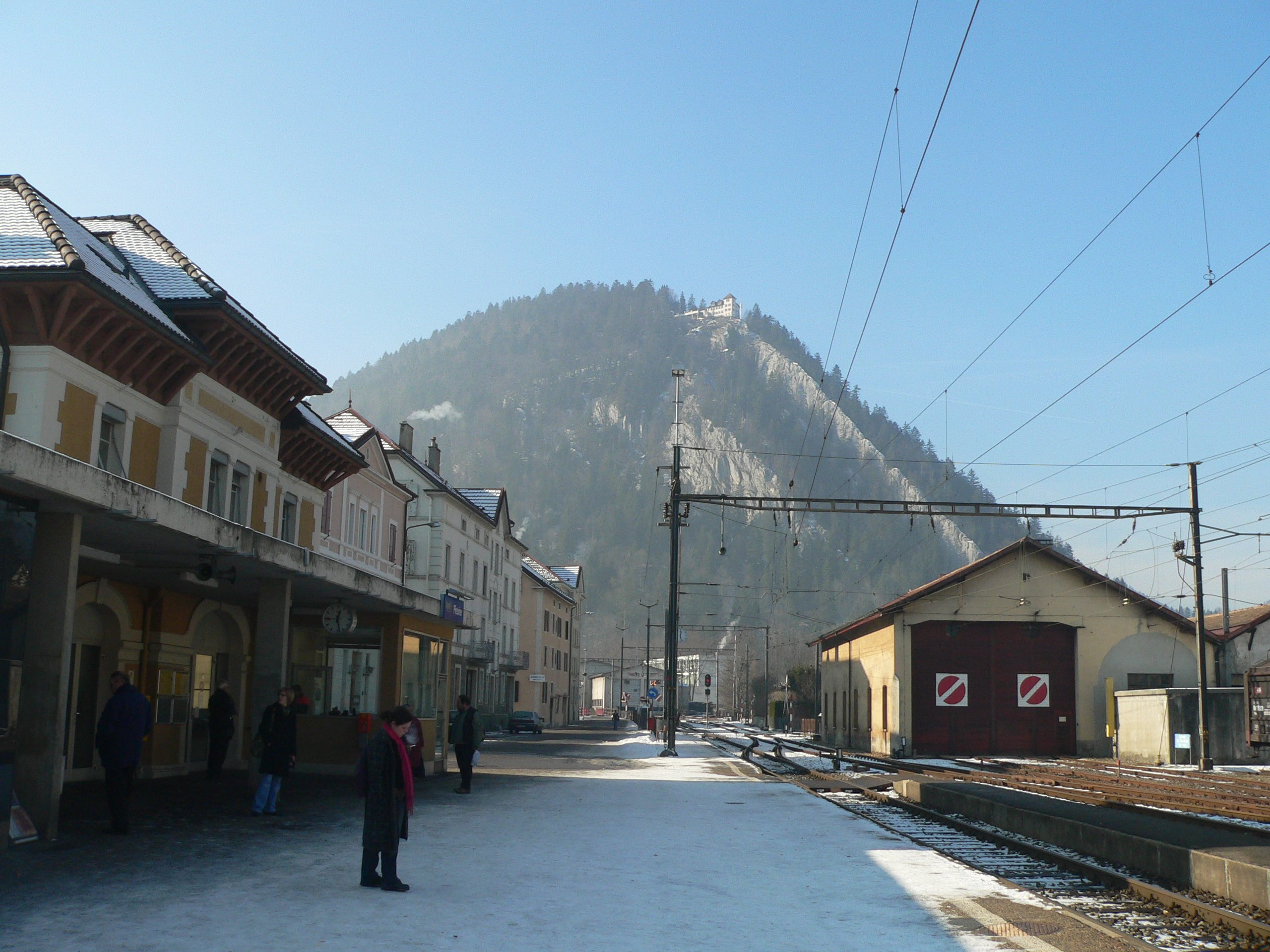
- The station in 2006

General information
- Location: Val-de-Travers; Switzerland
- Coordinates: 46°54′18″N 6°34′55″E
- Elevation: 742 m (2,434 ft)
- Owner: Transports publics Neuchâtelois
- Line: Travers–Buttes line
- Distance: 8.9 km (5.5 mi) from Travers
- Platforms: 1: 1 island platform; 1 side platform
- Tracks: 2
- Train operators: Transports publics Neuchâtelois
- Connections: CarPostal SA bus line; Transports publics Neuchâtelois bus lines

Construction
- Accessible: Yes

Other information
- Station code: 8504287 (FLE)
- Fare zone: 33 (Onde Verte)

Services
Preceding station	Transports publics Neuchâtelois	Following station
Buttes Terminus	R21	Môtiers NE towards Neuchâtel
Location
- Location within Switzerland Location within Canton of Neuchâtel

Fleurier railway station (French: Gare de Fleurier) is a railway station in the municipality of Val-de-Travers, in the Swiss canton of Neuchâtel. It is an intermediate stop on the standard gauge Travers–Buttes line of Transports publics Neuchâtelois.

== Services ==
As of the December 2023 timetable change, the following services stop at Fleurier:

- Regio: half-hourly service between Neuchâtel and Buttes.
