= Bôle railway station =

Railway station in Milvignes, Switzerland

Bôle
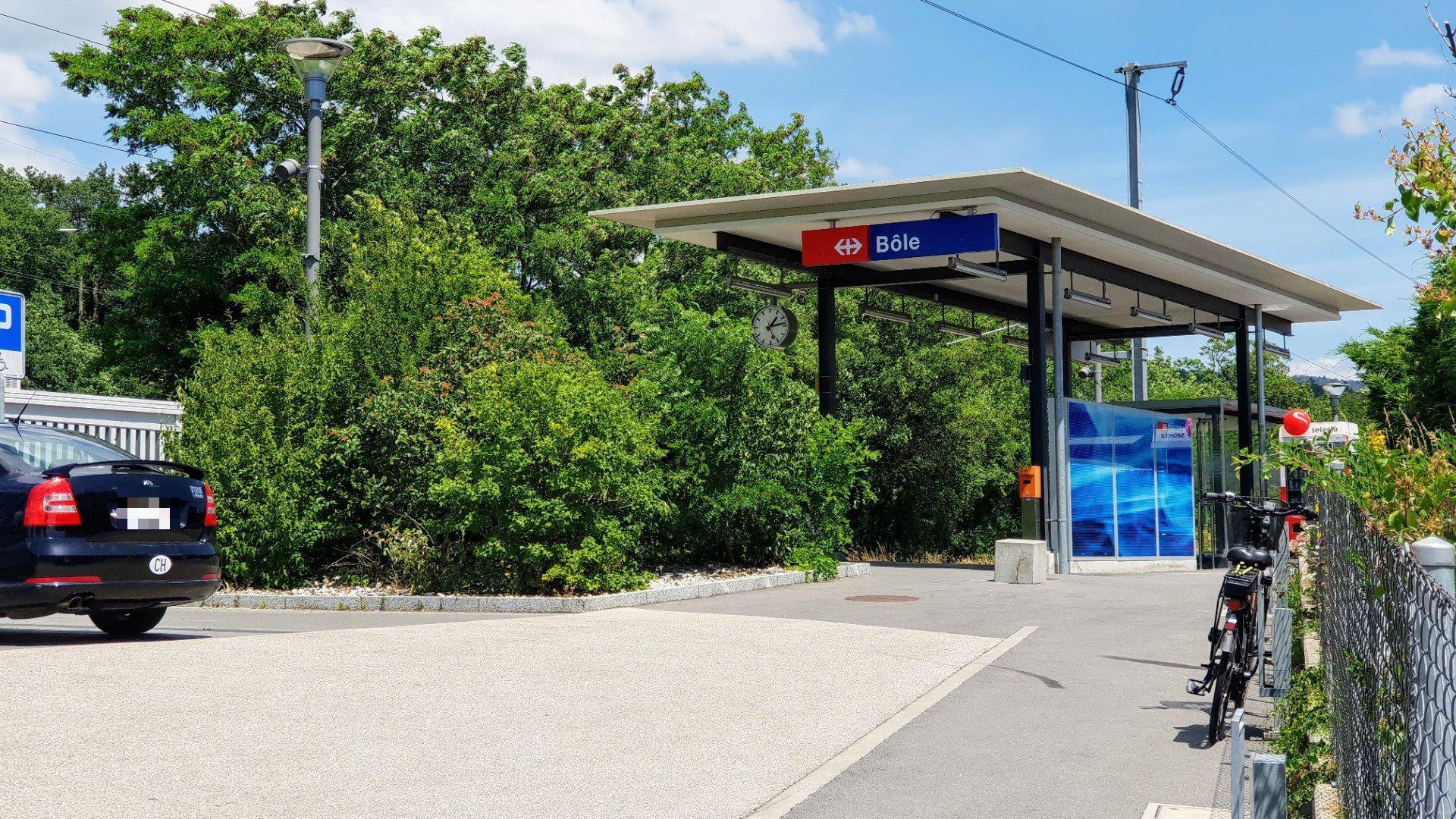
- The station platform in 2018

General information
- Location: Milvignes; Switzerland
- Coordinates: 46°58′10″N 6°50′18″E
- Elevation: 542 m (1,778 ft)
- Owner: Swiss Federal Railways
- Line: Neuchâtel–Pontarlier line
- Distance: 8.4 km (5.2 mi) from Neuchâtel
- Platforms: 1 side platform
- Tracks: 1
- Train operators: Transports publics Neuchâtelois
- Connections: Transports publics Neuchâtelois buses

Construction
- Parking: Yes (6 spaces)
- Accessible: Yes

Other information
- Station code: 8504218 (BOLE)
- Fare zone: 10 (Onde Verte)

Passengers
- 2022: 400 per weekday (SBB, transN)

Services
Preceding station	Transports publics Neuchâtelois	Following station
Champ-du-Moulin towards Buttes	R21	Auvernier towards Neuchâtel
Location
- Location within Switzerland Location within Canton of Neuchâtel

Bôle railway station (French: Gare de Bôle) is a railway station in the municipality of Milvignes, in the Swiss canton of Neuchâtel. It is an intermediate stop on the standard gauge Neuchâtel–Pontarlier line of Swiss Federal Railways.

== Services ==
As of the December 2024 timetable change, the following services stop at Bôle:

- Regio: half-hourly service between Neuchâtel and Buttes.
