= Champ-du-Moulin railway station =

Railway station in Rochefort, Switzerland

Champ-du-Moulin
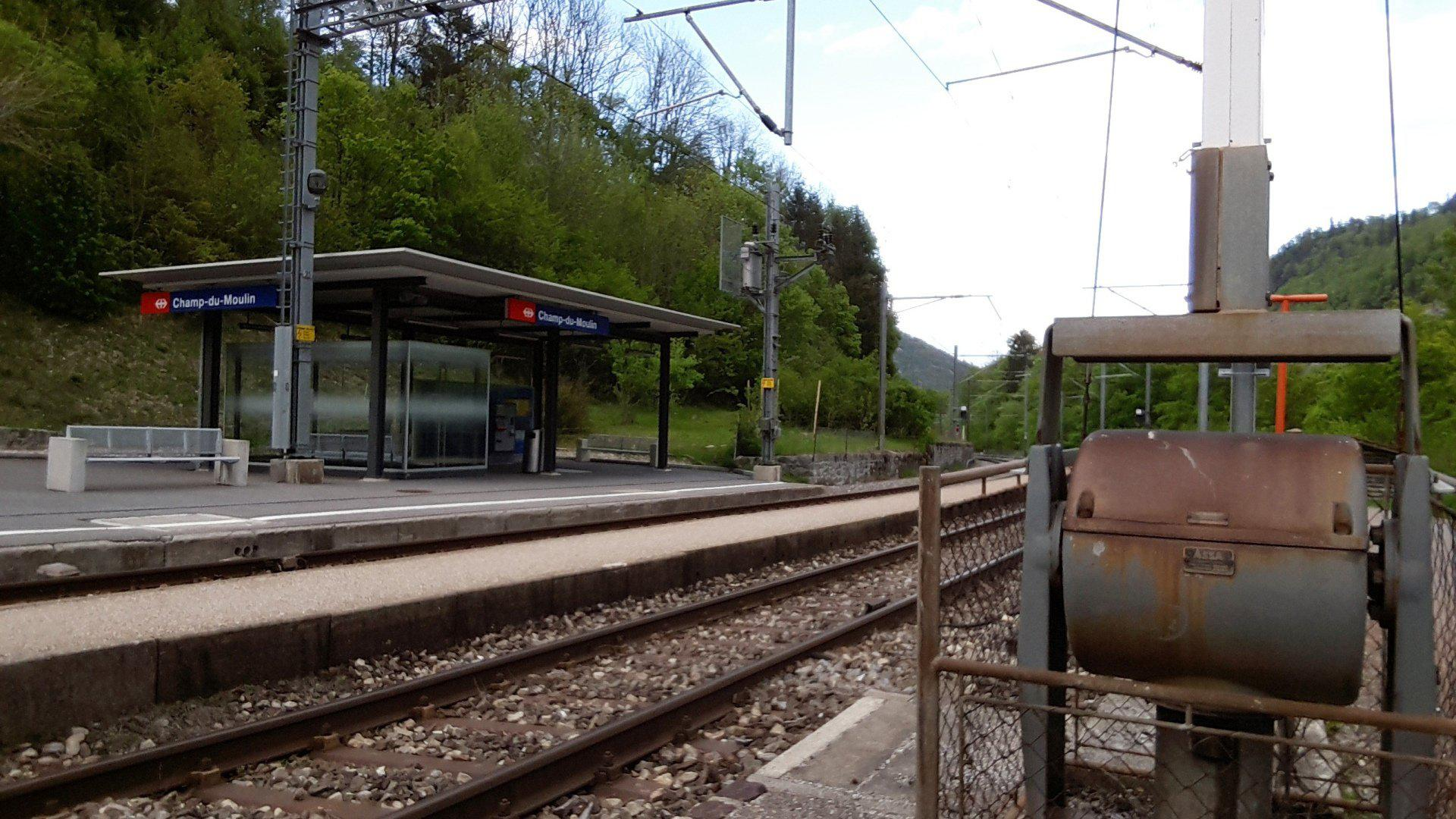
- The station platform in 2019

General information
- Location: Rochefort; Switzerland
- Coordinates: 46°57′36″N 6°46′30″E
- Elevation: 649 m (2,129 ft)
- Owner: Swiss Federal Railways
- Line: Neuchâtel–Pontarlier line
- Distance: 13.7 km (8.5 mi) from Neuchâtel
- Platforms: 2: 1 island platform; 1 side platform
- Tracks: 2
- Train operators: Transports publics Neuchâtelois

Construction
- Parking: 0
- Accessible: No

Other information
- Station code: 8504217 (CDM)
- Fare zone: 11 and 30 (Onde Verte)

Passengers
- 2022: 80 per weekday (SBB, transN)

Services
Preceding station	Transports publics Neuchâtelois	Following station
Noiraigue towards Buttes	R21	Bôle towards Neuchâtel
Location
- Location within Switzerland Location within Canton of Neuchâtel

Champ-du-Moulin railway station (French: Gare de Champ-du-Moulin) is a railway station in the municipality of Rochefort, in the Swiss canton of Neuchâtel. It is an intermediate stop on the standard gauge Neuchâtel–Pontarlier line of Swiss Federal Railways.

== Services ==
As of the December 2023 timetable change, the following services stop at Champ-du-Moulin:

- Regio: half-hourly service between Neuchâtel and Buttes.
