= Noiraigue railway station =

Railway station in Val-de-Travers, Switzerland

Noiraigue
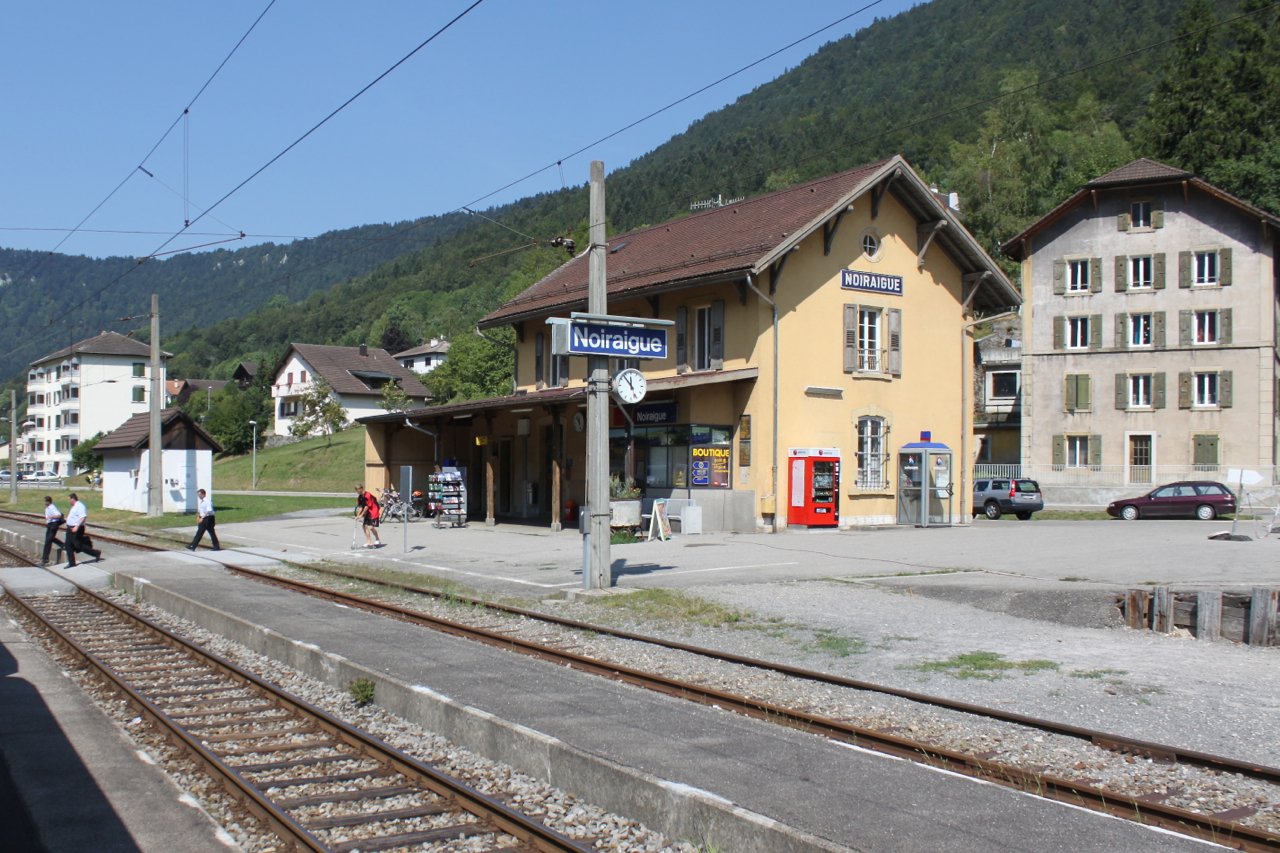
- The station in 2009

General information
- Location: Val-de-Travers; Switzerland
- Coordinates: 46°57′18″N 6°43′18″E
- Elevation: 727 m (2,385 ft)
- Owner: Swiss Federal Railways
- Line: Neuchâtel–Pontarlier line
- Distance: 18.1 km (11.2 mi) from Neuchâtel
- Platforms: 1 (2 island platforms)
- Tracks: 3
- Train operators: Transports publics Neuchâtelois

Construction
- Parking: 12
- Cycle facilities: 12
- Accessible: No

Other information
- Station code: 8504216 (NOI)
- Fare zone: 30 (Onde Verte)

Passengers
- 2022: 370 per weekday (SBB, transN)

Services
Preceding station	Transports publics Neuchâtelois	Following station
Travers towards Buttes	R21	Champ-du-Moulin towards Neuchâtel
Location
- Location within Switzerland Location within Canton of Neuchâtel

Noiraigue railway station (French: Gare de Noiraigue) is a railway station in the municipality of Val-de-Travers, in the Swiss canton of Neuchâtel. It is an intermediate stop on the standard gauge Neuchâtel–Pontarlier line of Swiss Federal Railways.

== Services ==
As of the December 2023 timetable change, the following services stop at Noiraigue:

- Regio: half-hourly service between Neuchâtel and Buttes.
