= Martigny–Orsières Railway =

Railway company in Switzerland

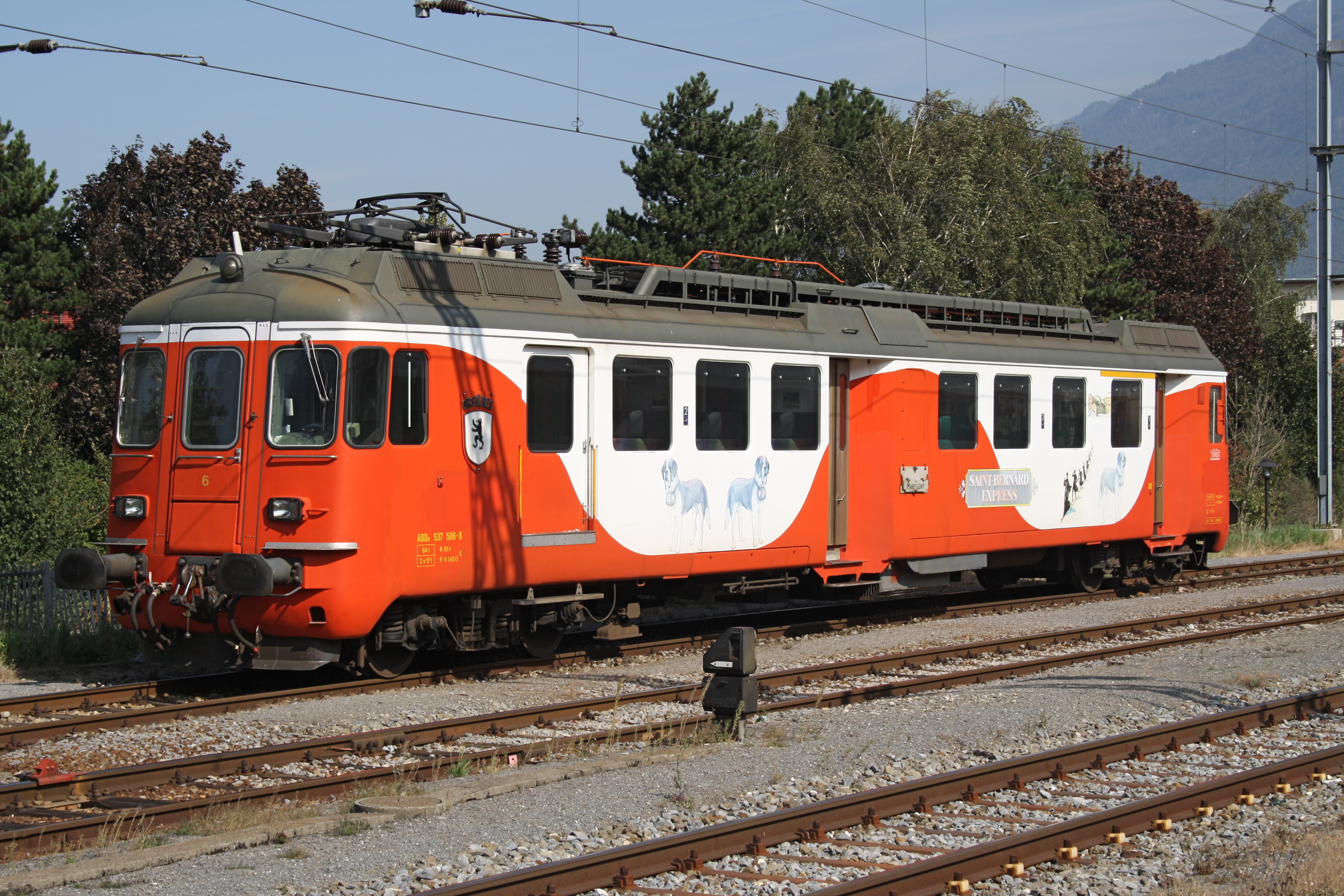
- ABDe 4/4 6 set in Martigny

Overview
- Locale: Valais, Switzerland
- Dates of operation: 1906–2000
- Successor: Transports de Martigny et Régions

Technical
- Track gauge: 1,435 mm (4 ft 8 1/2 in)
- Electrification: 8000 V 15 Hz AC overhead catenary (1910–1949); 15 kV 16.7 Hz AC overhead catenary (1949–2000)
- Length: 25.44 kilometres (15.81 mi)

The Martigny–Orsières Railway (Chemin de fer Martigny–Orsières; MO) was a railway company in the Canton of Valais in Switzerland. It merged in 2000 with the Martigny-Châtelard Railway (Chemin de fer Martigny-Châtelard, MC) to form Transports de Martigny et Régions (TMR). The MO's line consisted of the 19 km-long line from Martigny via Sembrancher to Orsières in the Val d’Entremont and the 6 km-long branch line from Sembrancher to Le Châble VS in the Val de Bagnes.

== History ==
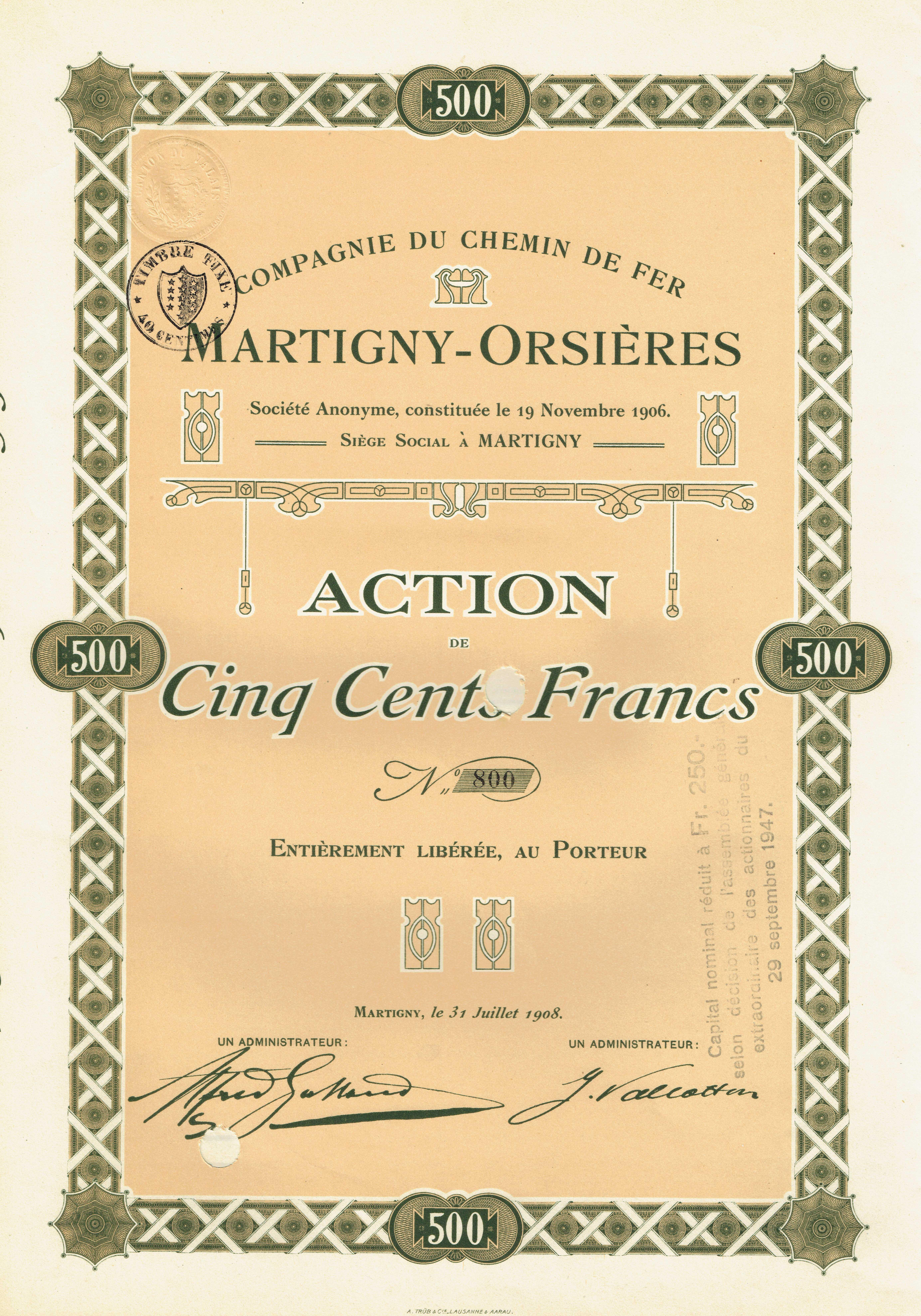
Share of the Compagnie du Chemin de Fer Martigny-Orsières, issued 31. July 1908

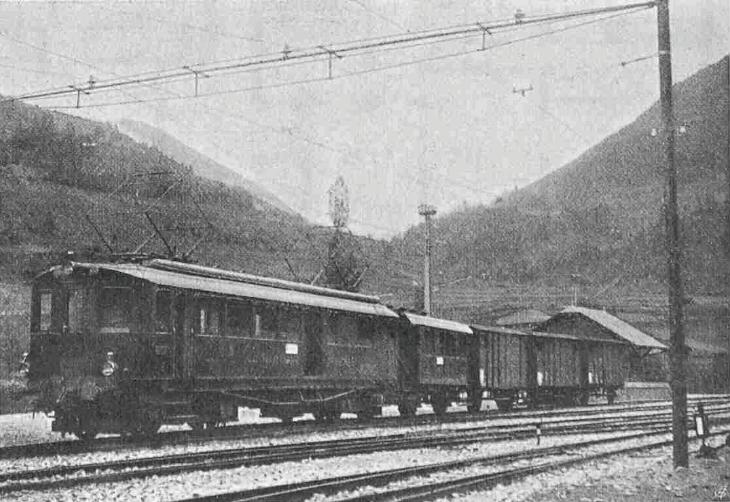
Mixed train from the opening years

The MO was granted a concession to build a standard gauge line from Martigny to Orsières in 1906. The railway company was established as a result of British Aluminium's plan to build an aluminum plant in Orsières. The ground-breaking ceremony was held on 23 July 1907 and operations commenced on 1 September 1910. The railway has been electrified at 8000 V 15 Hz AC since the beginning of operations. Traffic remained modest because neither the aluminium works nor the planned connection to the Aosta Valley were built. The MO was one of the first railway companies to supplement its rail activity with bus operations. The railway was later nationalised.

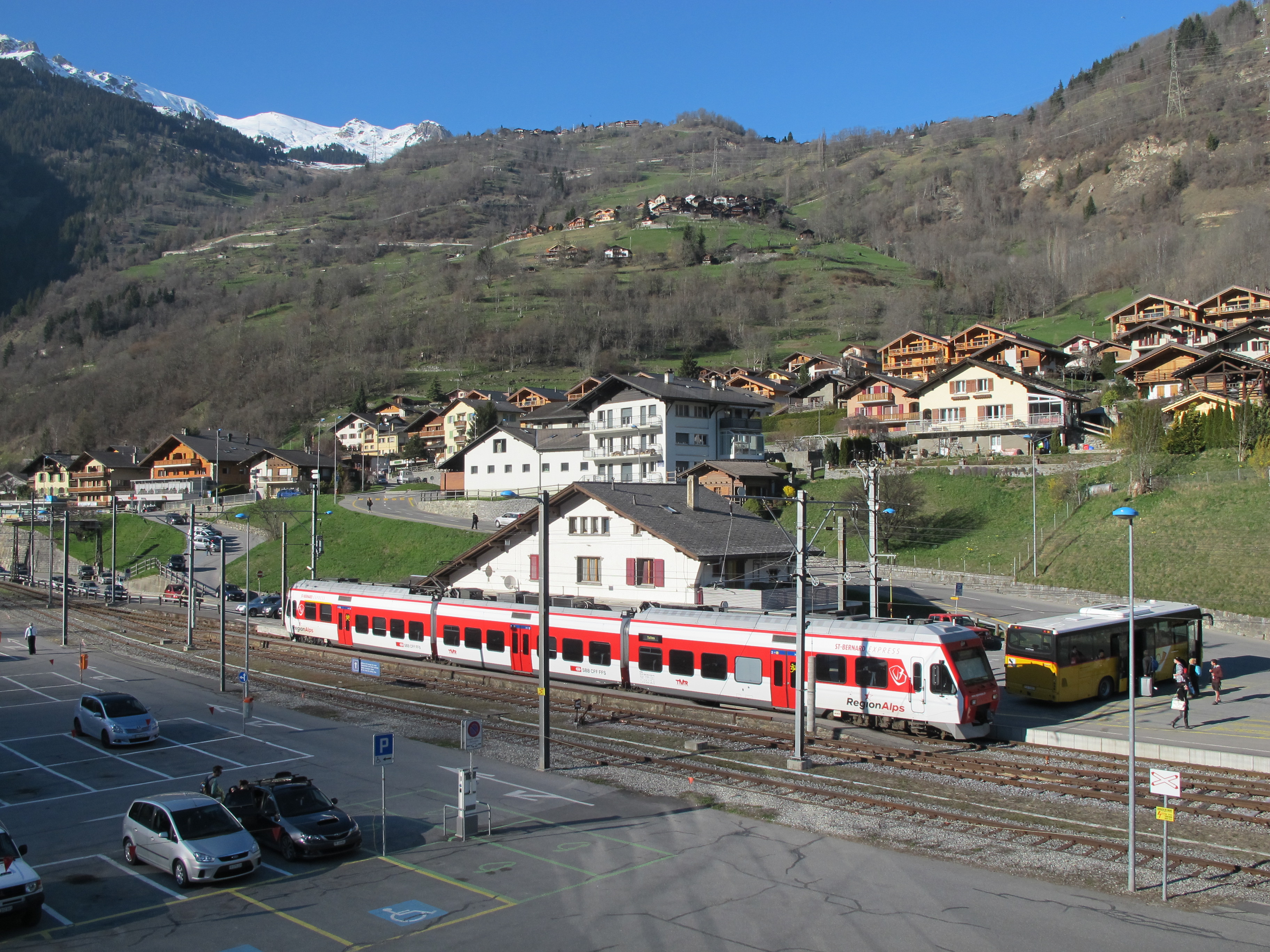
NINA railcar in the terminus of Le Châble.

The line was converted to SBB's 15 kV AC railway electrification system on 4 March 1949. This meant that traction vehicles of the SBB could also be used on the MO. The branch line from Sembrancher to Le Châble was opened on 5 August 1953 and served the construction of the Mauvoisin power station. The cement trains were hauled by SBB locomotives.

Originally goods traffic dominated operations on the MO. Since the 1970s, growing tourism has led to increased passenger traffic.

Two ABDe 4/4 railcars (6 and 8) collided front on at Martigny-Bourg on 1 September 1984. The train driver started towards Orsières despite the exit signal being at danger. The driver and five passengers were killed and 24 people were injured. The two railcars were rebuilt. The destroyed Bt 31 control car was replaced by a similar vehicle from the Régional du Val-de-Travers (RVT).

The MO merged with the Martigny-Châtelard Railway to form the Transports de Martigny et Régions (TMR) on 1 January 2000.

== Rolling stock ==
To start operations, MO procured two BCFe 4/4 passenger railcars (1–2) and two CFe 4/4 luggage railcars (11–12) with folding seats for passenger services. All four vehicles had the same electrical equipment with repulsion motors. The railcars were completely rebuilt with the conversion of the power system in 1949. BCFe 4/4 passenger railcars (3–4) were converted from the two baggage railcars.

The railcars were supplemented with ABDe 4/4 5 in 1955. A comprehensive renewal of the rolling stock took place from 1962 to 1965. The MO procured three ABDe 4/4 EAV (Eidgenössischen Amt für Verkehr—"Federal Office of Transport") railcars (6–8), three associated Bt control cars (31–33) and two standard passenger coaches (Einheitspersonenwagen). In 1983, a fourth, identical railcar was acquired from the Régional du Val-de-Travers (RVT) and classified in the rolling stock fleet as ABDe 4/4 9. The EAV motor coaches later received the designation ABDe 537 506–509.

The NINA railcar RABe 527 511–513, which had already been procured by the successor company TMR, has been in use on the MO lines since 2002.

Model class		Manufacturer	Build year	Origin	Quantity		Withdrawn / Scrapped	Remarks
Class	Number	Manufacturer	Build year	Origin	total	current	Withdrawn / Scrapped	Remarks
Railcars
BCFe 4/4	1–2	SWS/BBC	1910/1949		2	0	1966–1967	Sold to RVT and CJ
BCFe 4/4	3–4	SWS/BBC	1910/1949		2	0	1982–1990	ex CFe 4/4 11–12; no. 4 transferred to CJ
ABDe 4/4	5	ACMV/BBC	1955		1	0	2002	sold to Bahnmuseum Kallnach in 2002, taken over in 2024 by the Association des Trains Historiques du Chablais
ABDe 4/4	6–8	SIG/SWS; SAAS/BBC/MFO	1965		3	0	2008-2014	EAV railcar; no. 6 transferred in 2024 to DSF
ABDe 4/4	9	SIG/SWS; SAAS/BBC/MFO	1965	RVT (1983)	(used)1	1	2014 (defective)	EAV railcar; ex RVT 103
RABe 527	511–513	BT/Alstom	2002–2003		3	0	2009	Nina; sold to RegionAlps (RA)
RABe 527	514	BT/Alstom	2002–2003	BLS (2012)	(used)1	0	2012	Nina; sold directly to RA
Control cars
Bt	31	SWP	1965		3	0	1984	EAV (EW I); accident
Bt	32–33	SWP	1965		3	0	2014	EAV (EW I); transferred to Verein Depot und Schienenfahrzeuge Koblenz (DSF)
Bt	31^{II}		1964	RVT (1985)	(used)1	0	2014	ex RVT 201; transferred to DSF
Passenger cars
BCF	21–22	SWS	1910		2	0	1965–1966	
B	41		1962		2	0	2000	EW I; sold to TPF
B	42		1963		2	0	2005	EW I; sold to Club del San Gottardo
Tractors
Tm	11	SLM/?	1928	Sersa (1953)	(used)1	0	1990	ex SBB Em 2/2 101, PTT 2; scrapped in 1994
Tm	12			SBB (1965)	(used)1	0	1982	ex SBB Tm 531; sold to private individuals
Tm 237	554	Robert Aebi & Cie./?	1995	STAG (2005)	(used)1	1		Prototype "Ameise", Winpro locomotive factory
used = acquired from third-party stock (used vehicle)

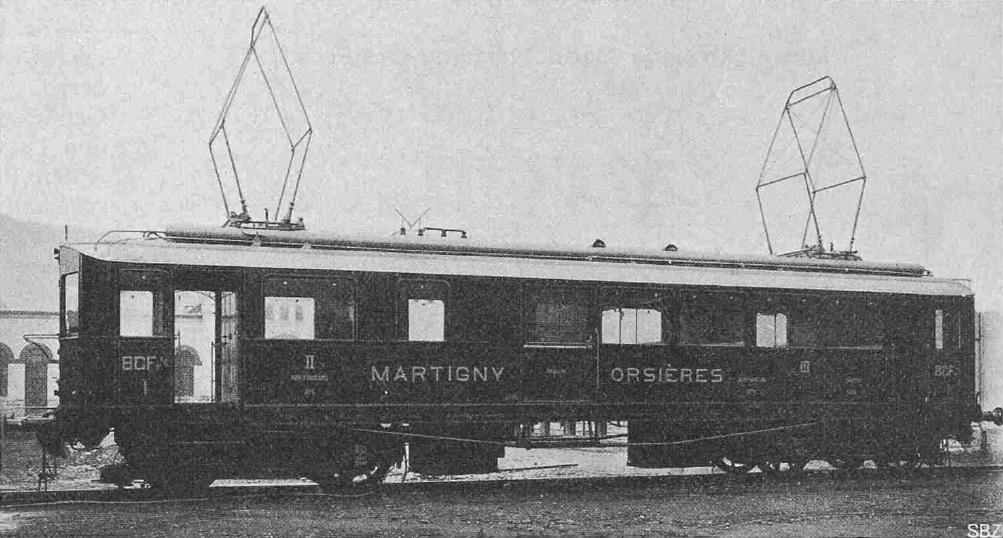
BCFe 4/4 1 passenger coach

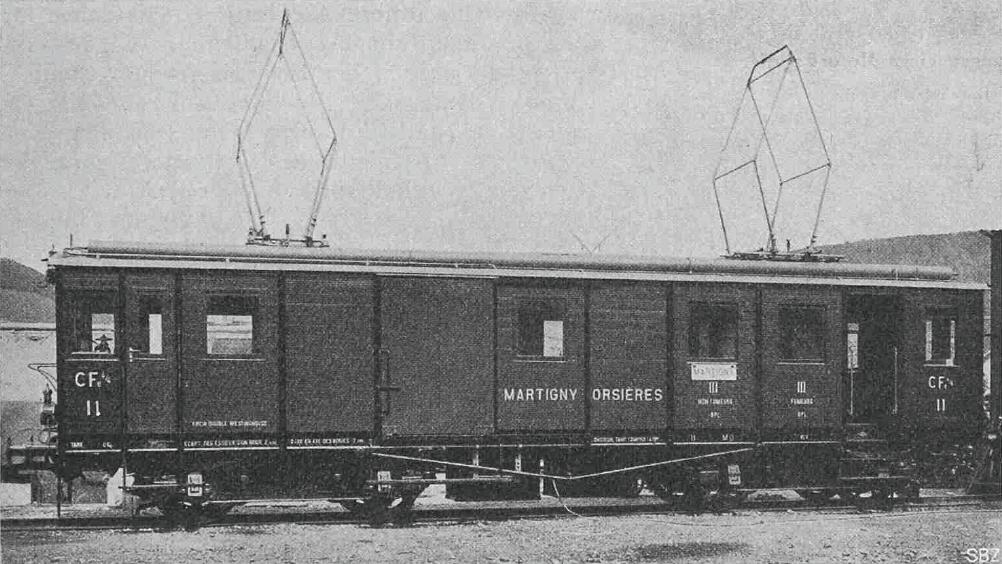
CFe 4/4 11 luggage waggon

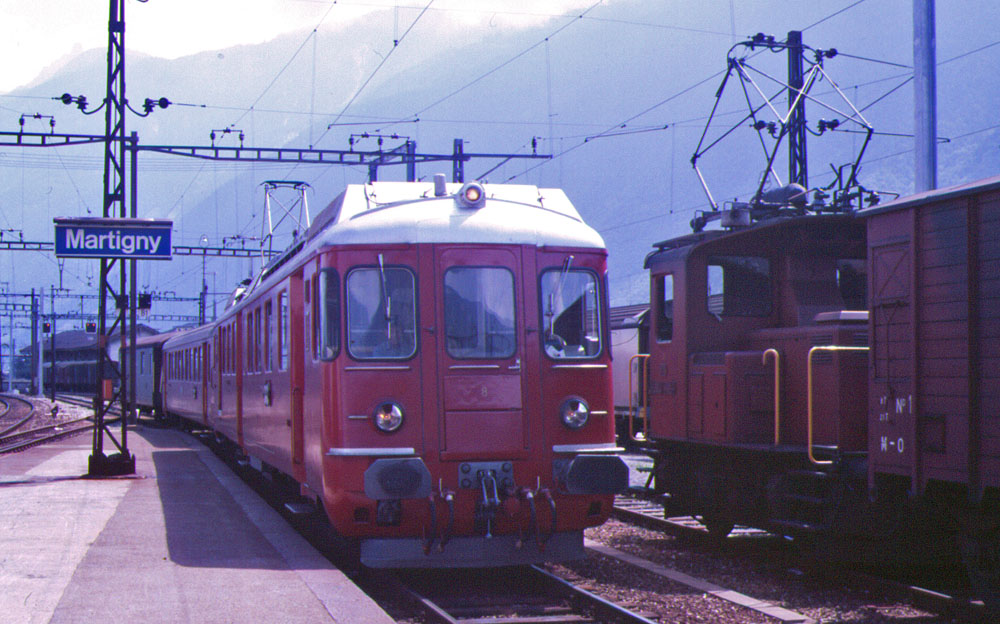
Push-pull train with ABDe 4/4

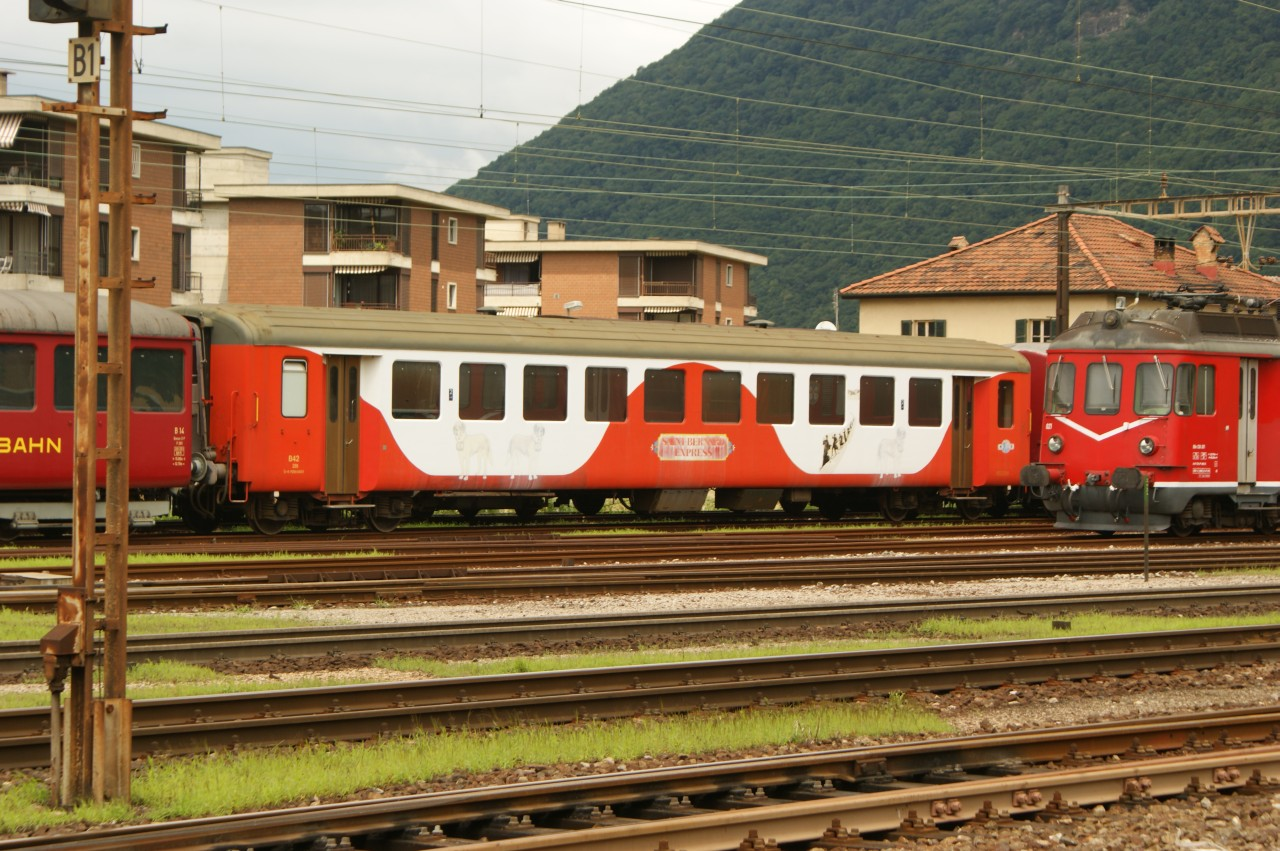
B 52 unitary coach
