= Emil Strub =

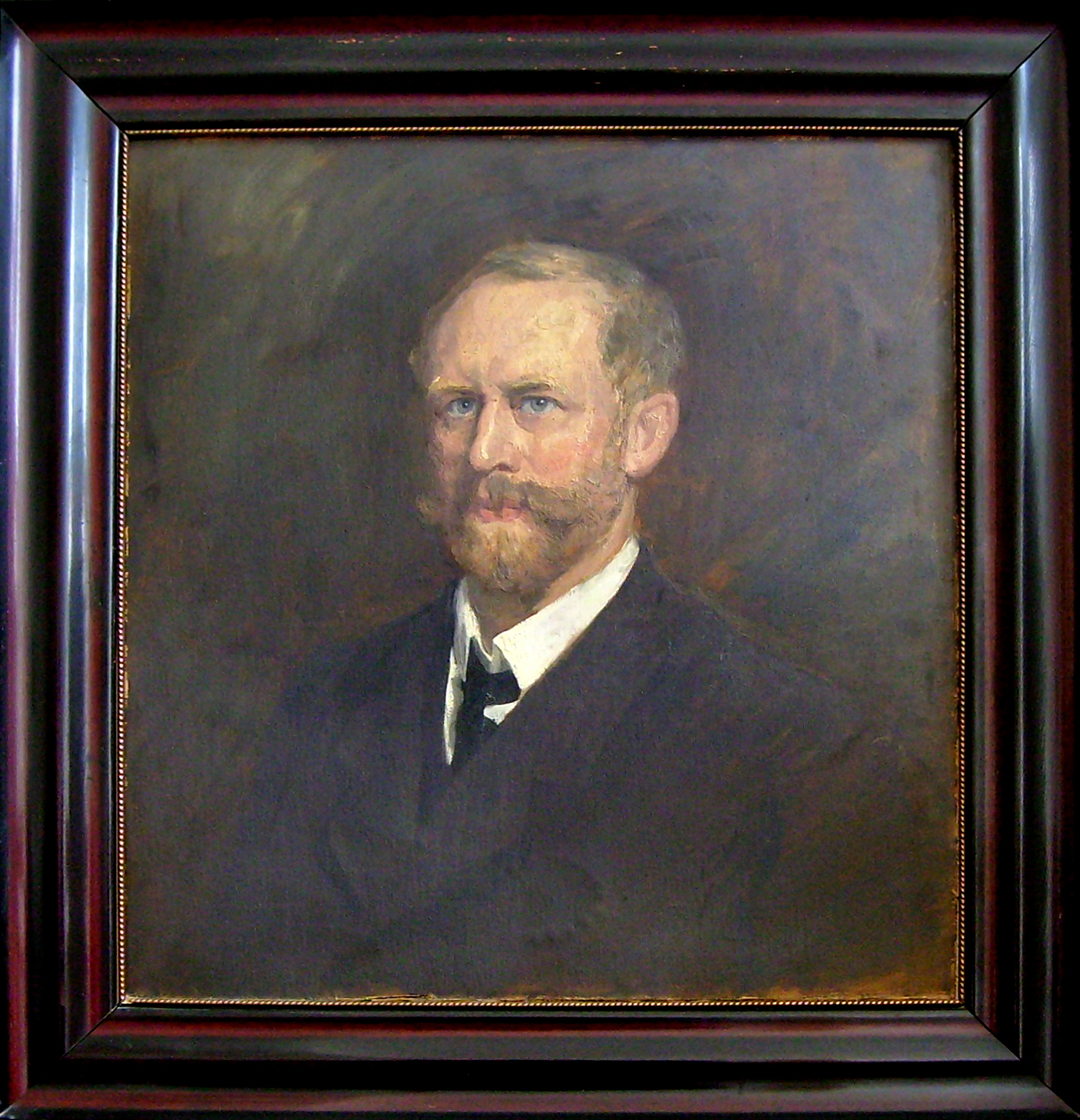
- Born: Emil Viktor Strub; July 13, 1858; Trimbach, Switzerland
- Died: December 15, 1909 (aged 51); Zurich, Trimbach, Switzerland
- Occupation: Inventor

Emil Viktor Strub (July 13, 1858 in Trimbach, Switzerland – December 15, 1909 in Zurich, Trimbach, Switzerland) was a Swiss builder, railway builder and inventor who invented the Strub rack system.

== Life and career ==
Emil Strub was born on July 13, 1858 in Trimbach, Switzerland, to Urs Viktor and Aloisia von Arx. Between 1882 and 1883, he learned mechanic from Niklaus Riggenbach at Aarau. He did engineer studies in Mittweida and he made an internship at a machine factory in Esslingen am Neckar.

In 1921 he founded Strub + Co. a tribology company in Olten. In 1958 his son Rudolf Strub took the lead of the company, who then gave it to his own son, Marcel Strub.

== Publications ==
- Strub, Emil (1892), "Unsere Drahtseilbahnen", Schweizerische Bauzeitung (in German), 19 (12/13/16): 77–81, 85–88, 110–111, 113, "Lausanne-Ouchy, Lausanne-Gare, Bürgenstock-Bahn, Salvatore-Bahn, Stanserhorn-Bahn, Giessbachbahn, Territet-Glion, Gütsch-Bahn, Marzili-Bahn, Lugano-Bahnhof, Biel-Magglingen, Zürichberg-Bahn, Beatenberg-Bahn, Ecluse-Plan, Lauterbrunnen-Grütsch, Ragaz-Wartenstein": a comparison of the funiculars

== See also ==
- Abt rack system
- Rack systems
