= La Chaux-de-Fonds–Les Ponts-de-Martel railway =

Narrow-gauge railway line in Switzerland

La Chaux-de-Fonds–Les Ponts-de-Martel
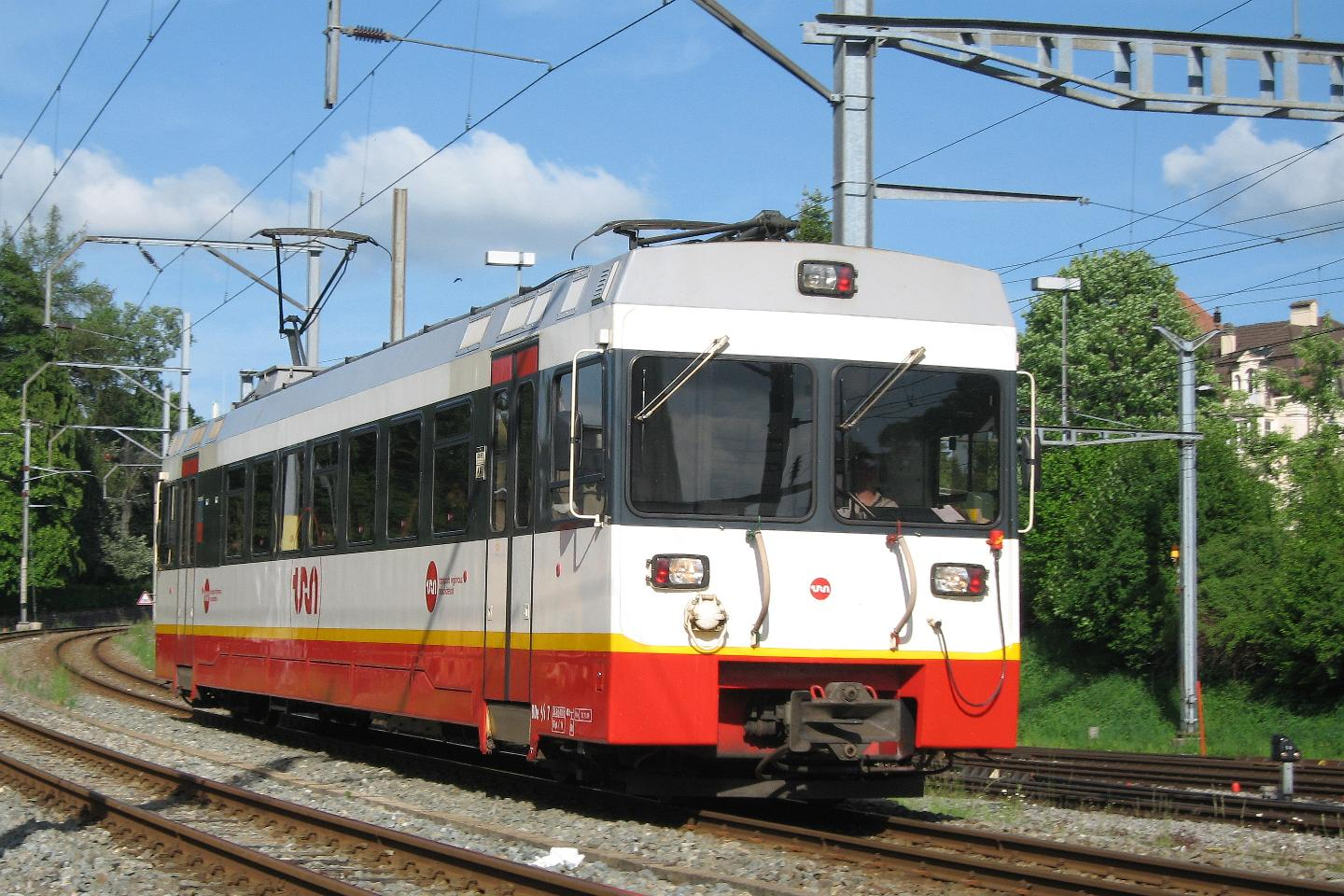
- A TRN railcar enters La Chaux-de-Fonds from the Vallée de la Sagne in 2011

Overview
- Owner: Transports publics Neuchâtelois
- Locale: Switzerland
- Termini: La Chaux-de-Fonds; Les Ponts-de-Martel

Service
- Route number: 222

Technical
- Line length: 16.2 km (10.1 mi)
- Track gauge: 1,000 mm (3 ft 3 3/8 in) metre gauge
- Electrification: 1500 V DC
- Maximum incline: 40.0%

The La Chaux-de-Fonds–Les Ponts-de-Martel railway is a metre-gauge railway in the Swiss Jura. It is operated by the Transports publics Neuchâtelois and has connected the municipalities of Les Ponts-de-Martel and La Sagne in the Vallée des Ponts (also called the Vallée de la Sagne) with La Chaux-de-Fonds since 26 July 1889.

== History ==
Ownership of the line has changed several times over its history. It was built in 1889 by the Ponts-Sagne-La Chaux-de-Fonds (PSC). The PSC merged with the Régional des Brenets in 1947 to form the Chemins de fer des Montagnes Neuchâteloises (CMN). The CMN, in turn, was one of several companies that merged in 1999 to form the Transports Régionaux Neuchâtelois (TRN). The TRN merged with the Compagnie des Transports en commun de Neuchâtel et environs in 2012 to form the Transports publics Neuchâtelois, the current operator.

== Route ==
The railway was built by the Ponts–Sagne–Chaux-de-Fonds Railway (French legal name: Chemin de fer Régional La Chaux-de-Fonds - Les Ponts-de-Martel, PSC) as a metre-gauge line and is just over 16 kilometres long. It has one track and train crossings are now only possible in La Sagne. Since 28 November 1893, it has connected in La Chaux-de-Fonds at a common station with the also metre-gauge Saignelégier–La Chaux-de-Fonds railway (SC), which since 1 January 1944 has been part of the Chemins de fer du Jura (CJ).

The line leaves La Chaux-de-Fonds station (at 994 metres above sea level) on a steep gradient of 4.0 percent and reaches its high point of 1120 metres after passing through a tunnel in Reymond. From there, the line initially descends at 3.1 percent into the high valley. At the foot of a spur that it has just crossed, the line runs in an almost straight line to La Sagne and from there with a descent of only 1.6 percent to Les Ponts-de-Martel, including a short climb of 1.0 percent. There is a local depot in Les Ponts-de-Martel formed of several sidings.

In May 1915, the Saignelégier–La Chaux-de-Fonds Railway opened a transporter wagon yard in La Chaux-de-Fonds. The same transporter wagon system was also shared by the Chemins de fer des Montagnes Neuchâteloises from 1966, which began the transport of standard-gauge railway wagons on the line to Les Ponts-de-Martel. However, the CMN phased out all freight traffic. The transporter wagon yard was also used by the CJ for several years but it no longer exists.

== Connecting lines ==
The standard-gauge station in La Chaux-de-Fonds was opened on 2 July 1857 and was the temporary terminus of the line to Le Locle, which was opened by the Compagnie Jura industriel (JI). The continuation to Convers was opened by the same company on 27 November 1859 and provided a connection to Neuchâtel until mid-1860, while the line to Biel/Bienne was opened by the Jura bernois (JB) in mid-1874. On 17 December 1888, the Jura–Bern–Luzern (JBL) company opened the direct line from Biel to La Chaux-de-Fonds through the Crosettes tunnel and the Renan–Le Convers connection was closed in 1895.
