= La Presta Asphalt Mine =

Former asphalt mine in Switzerland

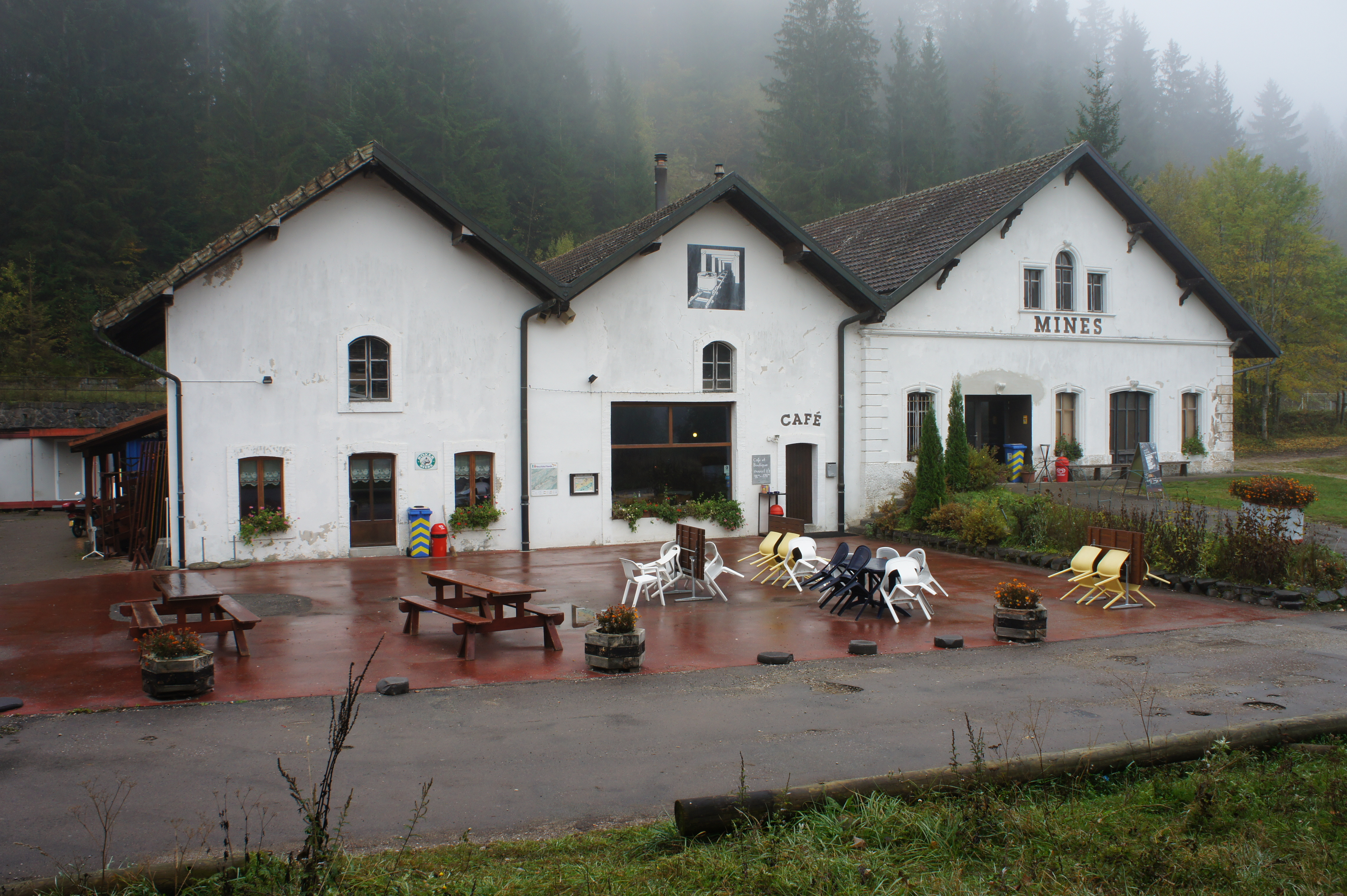
Exterior of the mine in 2011

La Presta Asphalt Mine (French: Mines d'asphalte de la Presa) is a former asphalt mine in the Val-de-Travers region of the canton of Neuchâtel, Switzerland. The mine was exploited until 1986 and asphalt was exported in most of Europe and in the United States.

Today the mines are no longer in operation and are partially open to the public as a museum. A dedicated train station, La Presta Mines d'asphalte, located near the mine, is served by regional trains. Steam trains operated by Vapeur Val-de-Travers also occasionally serve the station.
