= Funiculaire Ecluse–Plan =

Funicular railway in Neuchâtel, Switzerland

Funiculaire Ecluse - Plan
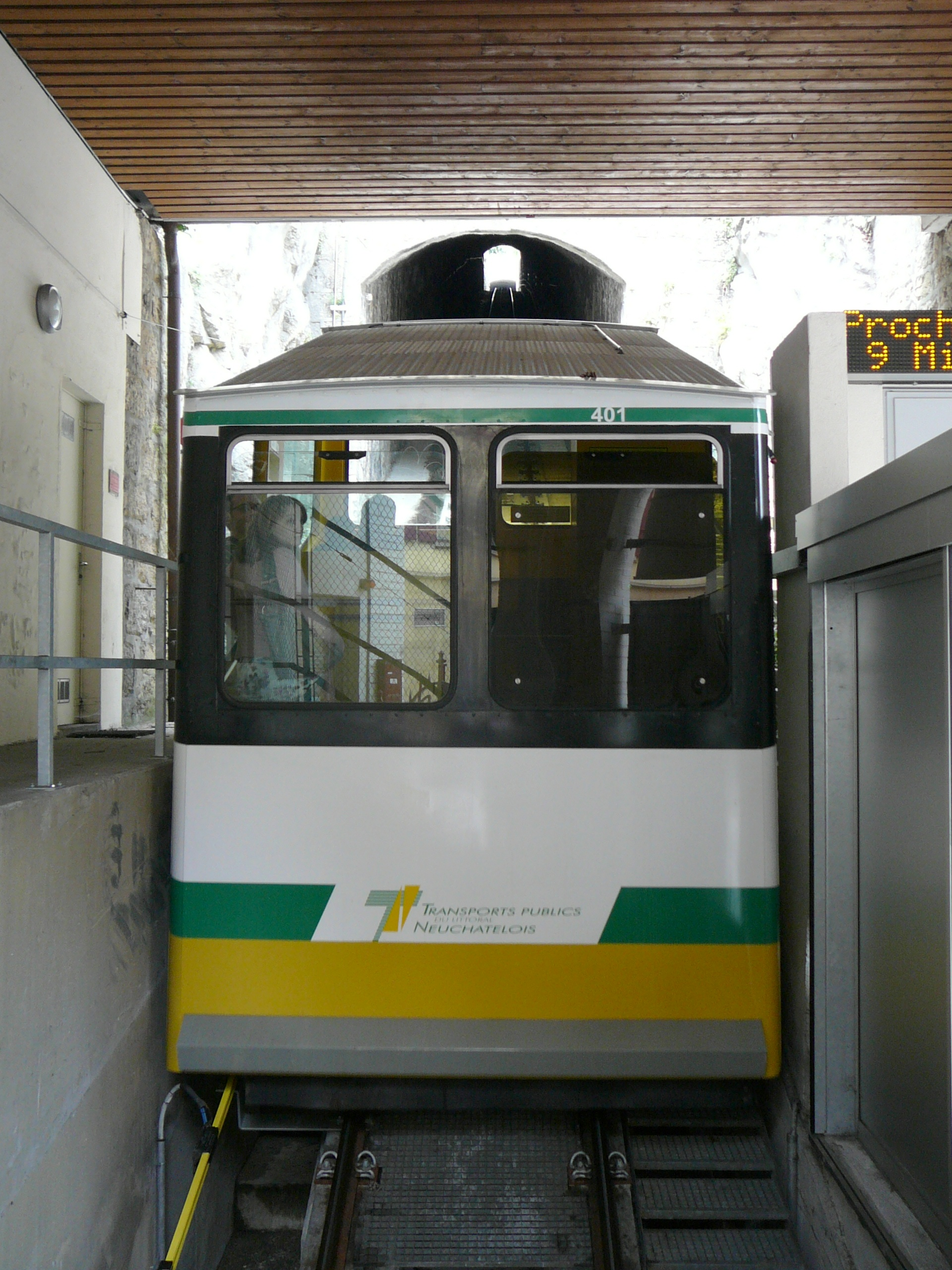
- At Ecluse (2010)

Overview
- Status: In operation
- Owner: Transports publics Neuchâtelois (TransN, TRN)
- Locale: Neuchâtel; Switzerland
- Termini: Neuchâtel, Ecluse (FUNI); Neuchâtel, Plan (FUNI)
- Stations: 4
- Website: TransN

Service
- Type: Funicular
- Services: 112
- Operator(s): Transports publics Neuchâtelois
- Rolling stock: 2 for 30 persons each (32 originally)

History
- Opened: 1890

Technical
- Line length: 399 m (1,309 ft)
- Number of tracks: 1 with passing loop
- Rack system: (before 1907: Riggenbach)
- Track gauge: 1,000 mm (3 ft 3 3/8 in)
- Electrification: 1907 (water counterbalancing before)
- Conduction system: automated in 1985
- Operating speed: 4 metres per second (13 ft/s)
- Maximum incline: 38% (average: 29.5%)

Funiculaire Ecluse - Plan is a funicular railway in Neuchâtel, Switzerland. The line leads from Ecluse at 442 m to Plan at 556 m, the neighborhood of the city on Le Plan (595 m). The funicular with two cars has a single track with a passing loop. The line of 399 m in length has a difference of elevation of 111 m. Intermediate stations are Boine (520 m) and Côte. The lower part and the passing loop are in tunnels (80 m and 86 m length originally). Built in 1890, it is the oldest of the three funicular railways in the city of Neuchâtel. It was a rack railway of the Riggenbach type and it used water counterbalancing before electrification in 1907. The funicular is owned and operated by Transports publics Neuchâtelois.
