= Travers railway station =

Railway station in Val-de-Travers, Switzerland

Travers
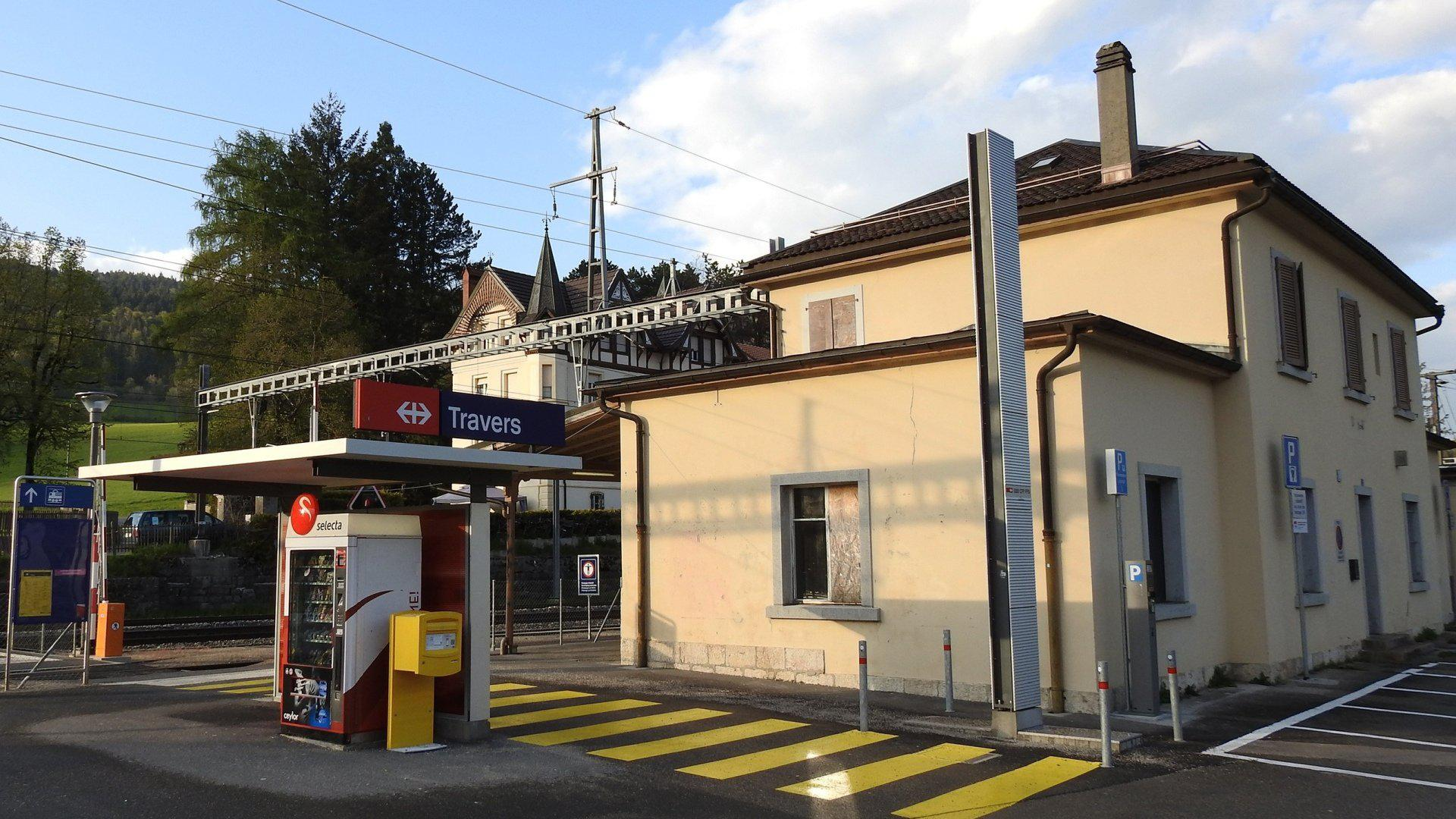
- The station building in 2019

General information
- Location: Val-de-Travers; Switzerland
- Coordinates: 46°56′33″N 6°40′36″E
- Elevation: 748 m (2,454 ft)
- Owner: Swiss Federal Railways
- Lines: Neuchâtel–Pontarlier line; Travers–Buttes line
- Distance: 22.5 km (14.0 mi) from Neuchâtel
- Platforms: 2 (1 side platform)
- Tracks: 2
- Train operators: Swiss Federal Railways; Transports publics Neuchâtelois

Construction
- Parking: 20
- Accessible: Partly

Other information
- Station code: 8504215 (TR)
- Fare zone: 30 (Onde Verte)

Passengers
- 2023: 440 per weekday (SBB, transN)

Services
Preceding station	SBB CFF FFS	Following station
Pontarlier towards Frasne	RE9	Neuchâtel Terminus
Preceding station	Transports publics Neuchâtelois	Following station
La Presta Mines d'asphalte towards Buttes	R21	Noiraigue towards Neuchâtel
Location
- Location within Switzerland Location within Canton of Neuchâtel

Travers railway station (French: Gare de Travers) is a railway station in the municipality of Val-de-Travers, in the Swiss canton of Neuchâtel. It is located at the junction of the standard gauge Neuchâtel–Pontarlier line of Swiss Federal Railways and the Travers–Buttes line of Transports publics Neuchâtelois.

== Services ==
As of the December 2023 timetable change, the following services stop at Travers:

- RegioExpress: three trains per day between Neuchâtel and Frasne, connecting with the Paris–Lausanne TGV Lyria service.
- Regio: half-hourly service between Neuchâtel and Buttes.

== Gallery ==
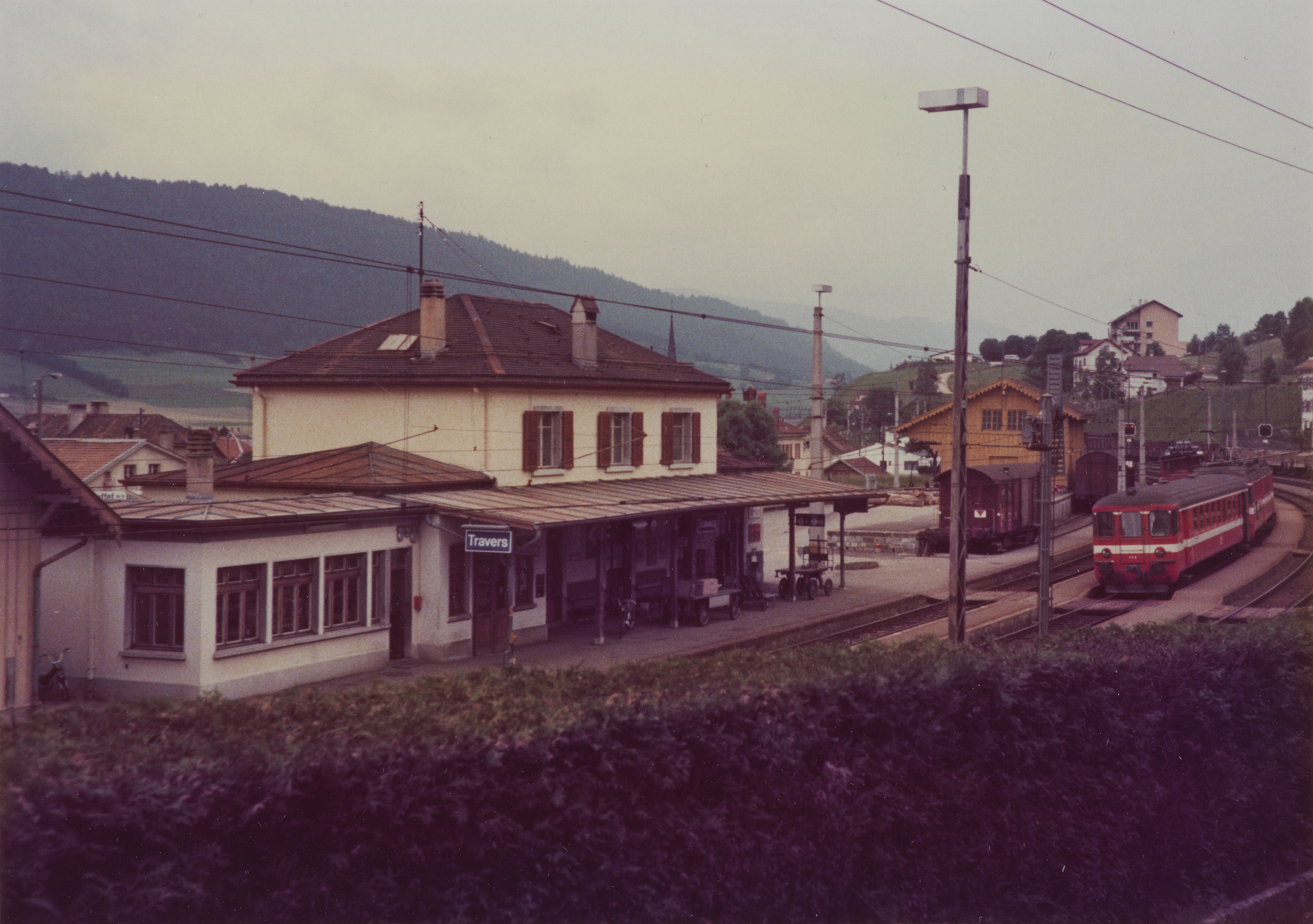
Station in 1978

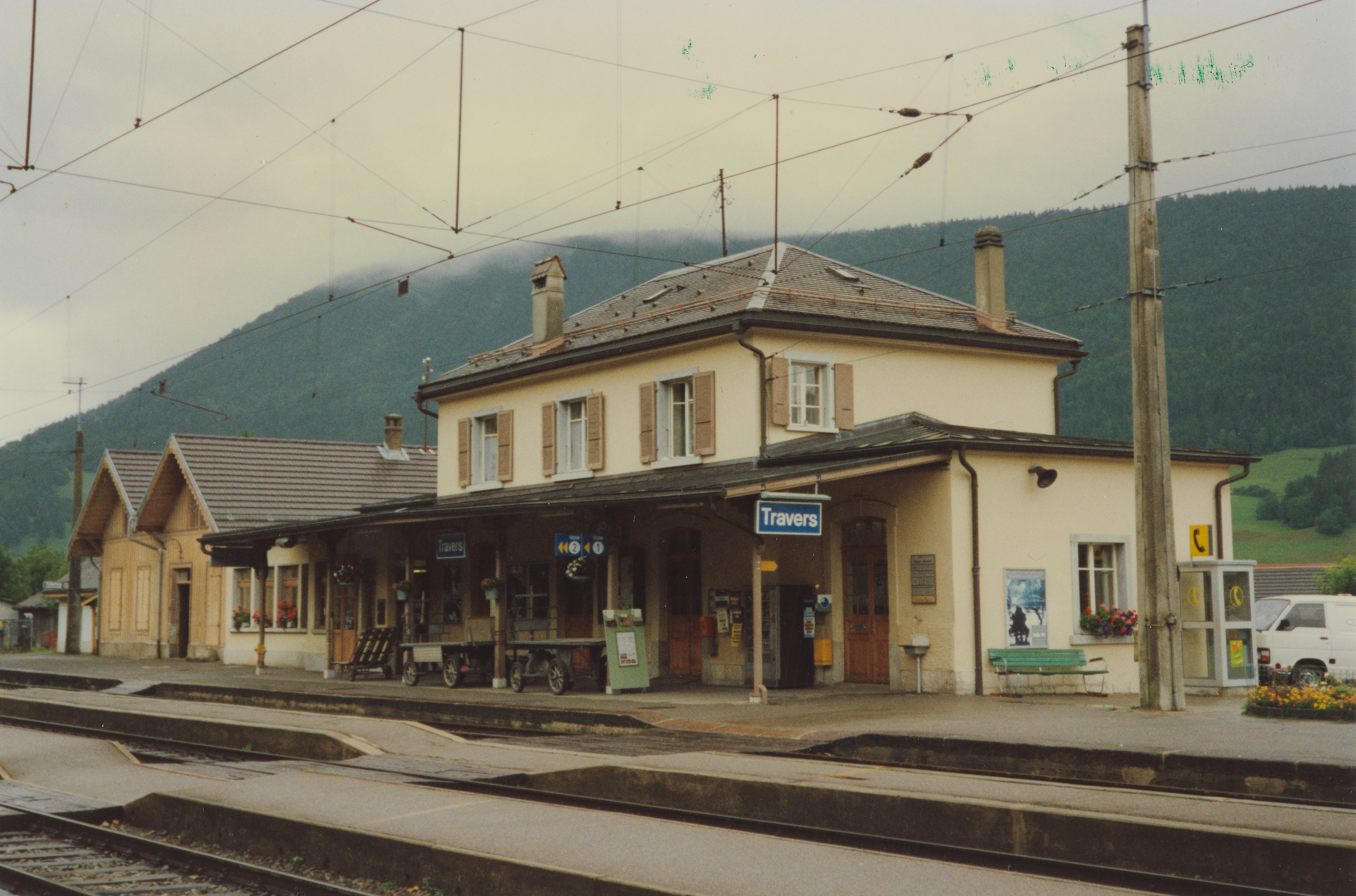
Station in 1991

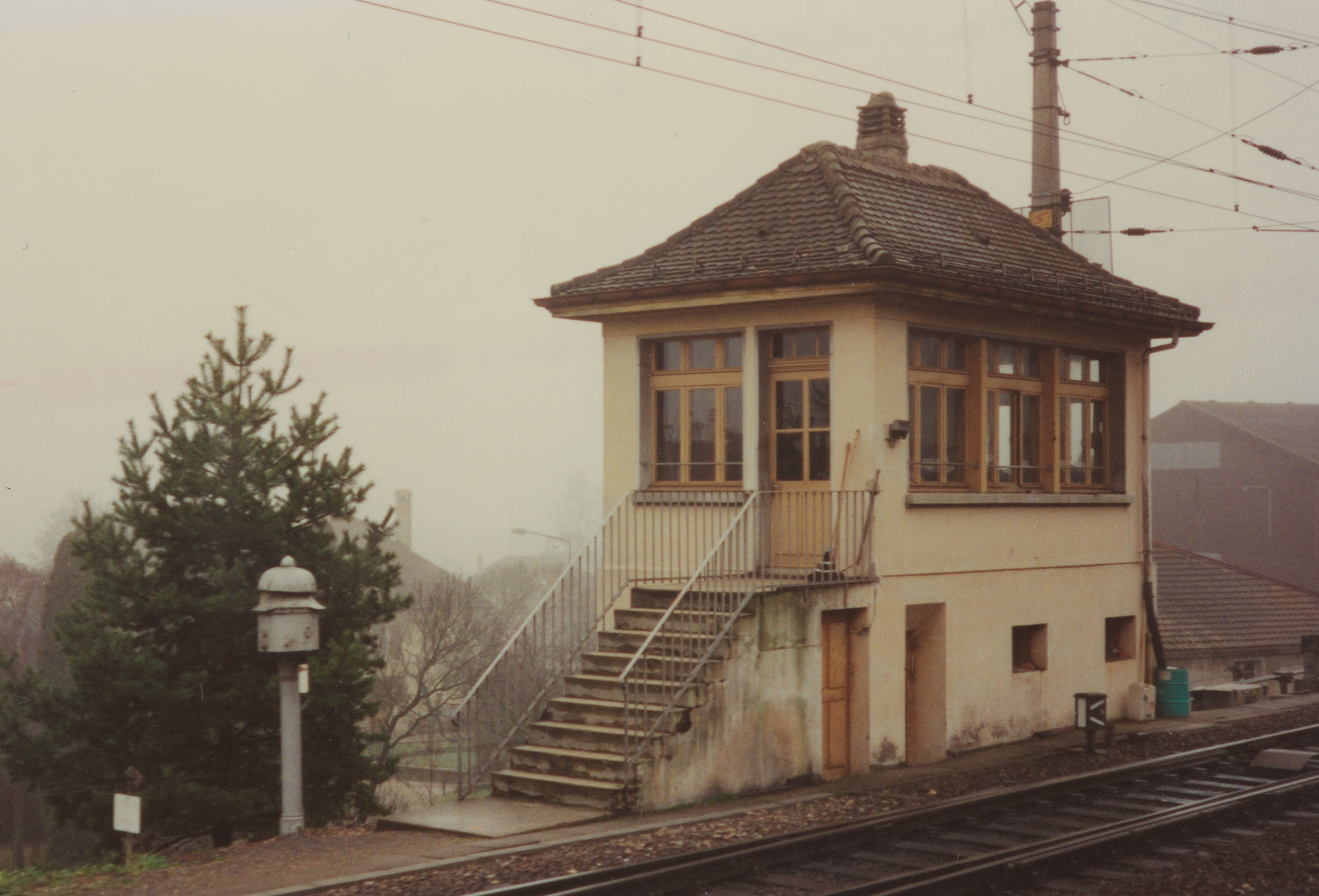
Signal box in ca. 1990
