= Vapeur Val-de-Travers =

Coordinates: 46.9084°N 6.5668°E

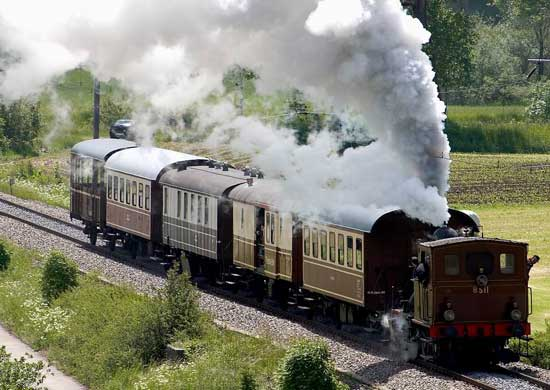
Steam train operated on the line

Vapeur Val-de-Travers is a heritage railway and railway museum based in Saint-Sulpice (Neuchâtel). The company operates historic steam trains in the Val-de-Travers, on the disused Saint-Sulpice - Fleurier line, but also on the regional line to Neuchâtel via Travers. It also collaborates with the main navigation compagny of Lake Neuchâtel and offers paddle steamer rides.

The railway notably serves the railway station of the former La Presta Asphalt Mine, now a museum.

== See also ==
- List of heritage railways and funiculars in Switzerland
