= Compagnie des Transports en commun de Neuchâtel et environs =

- Trade name: Transports Publics du Littoral Neuchâtelois
- Industry: Transport
- Defunct: 2012
- Successor: Transports publics Neuchâtelois
- Headquarters: Neuchâtel, Switzerland
- Area served: Neuchâtel

The Compagnie des Transports en commun de Neuchâtel et environs (TN) was a public transport operator in and around the Swiss city of Neuchâtel. It operated the city's network of trams, trolleybuses and motor buses, under the marketing name Transports Publics du Littoral Neuchâtelois. It merged with Transports Régionaux Neuchâtelois in 2012 to form the Transports publics Neuchâtelois.

== See also ==
- Trams in Neuchâtel
- Trolleybuses in Neuchâtel
