= Schweizerische Wagons- und Aufzügefabrik AG Schlieren-Zürich =

Schweizerische Wagons- Und Aufzugefabrik AG Schlieren-Zürich
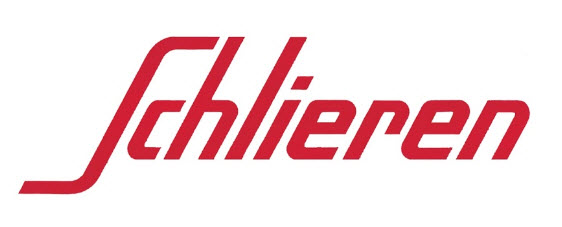
- Company type: Subsidiary
- Industry: Rail transport
- Founded: 1895; 131 years ago
- Defunct: 1997
- Fate: Acquired By Stadler Rail
- Headquarters: Schlieren, Switzerland
- Area served: Worldwide
- Products: Railroad cars Elevators

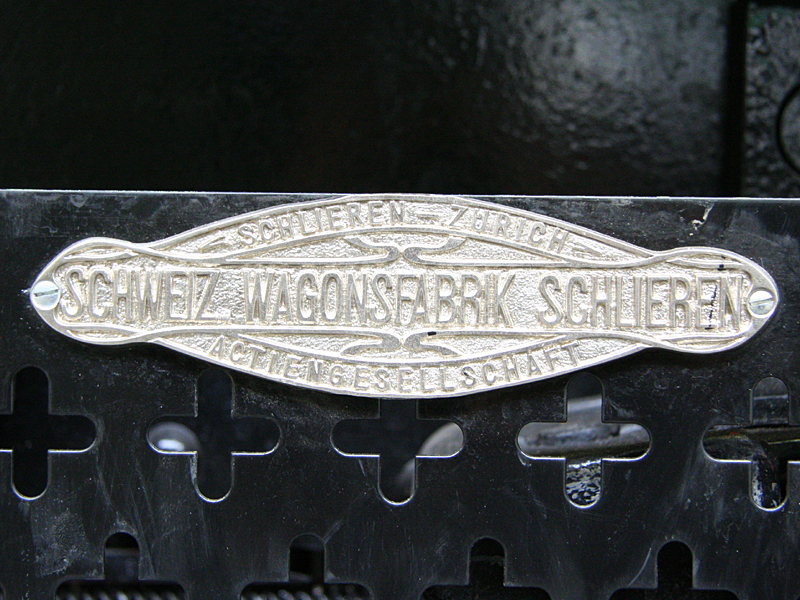
Wagi Schlieren builders plate on heritage tramcar Ce 2/2 ("Lisbethli") from 1900 (Zurich Tram Museum).

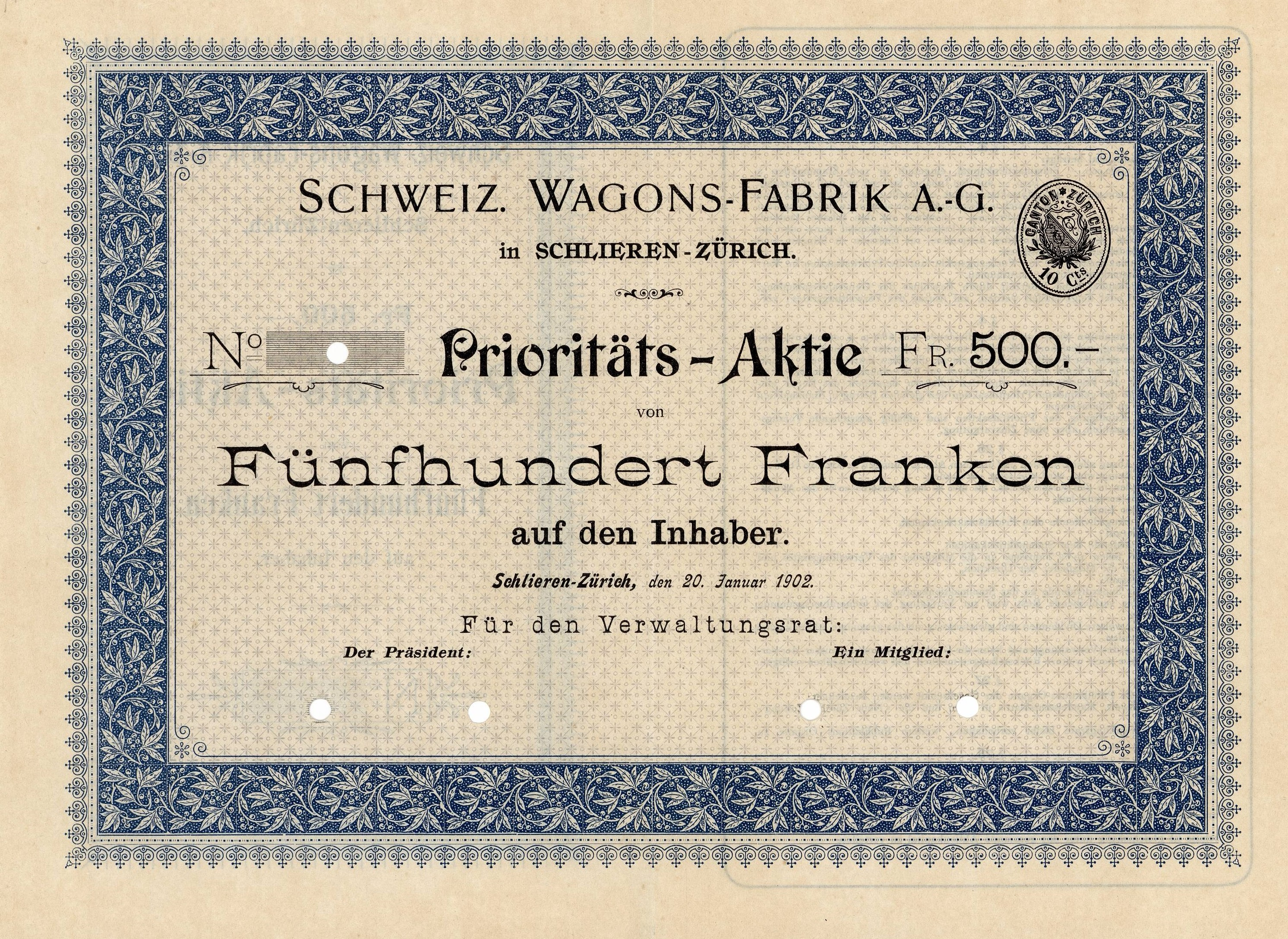
Share of the Schweizerische Wagons-Fabrik AG, issued 20. January 1902

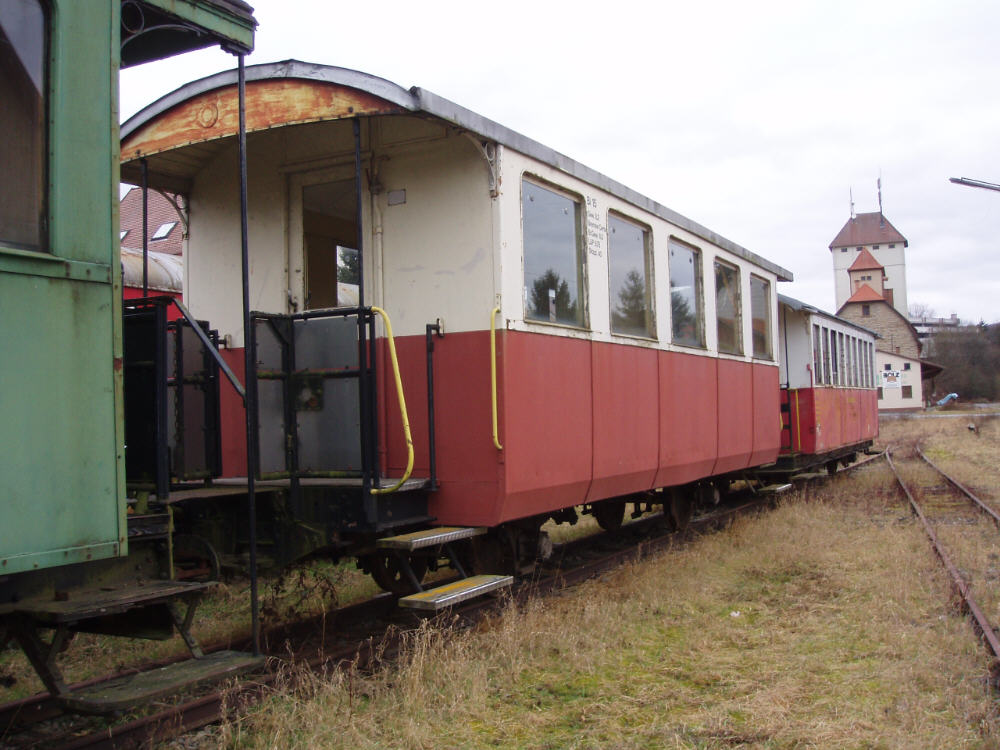
A carriage built in 1920

The Schweizerische Wagons- und Aufzügefabrik AG (SWS, Swiss Railcar and Lift Factory Corporation, known colloquially as "Wagi"), which was based in Schlieren in the of canton of Zurich, Switzerland, was a manufacturer of railway rolling stock and lifts.

The company was founded in 1895 as Firma Geissberger & Cie., which opened a wagon factory at Schlieren railway station. In 1899, the company became Schweizerische Wagen- und Wagons-Fabrik AG, based in Zurich. Just one year later, the company moved its base back to Schlieren, and in 1901, there was another renaming, to Schweizerische Wagons-Fabrik AG in Schlieren-Zürich (SWS).

In 1903, the newly formed Swiss Federal Railways (SBB) ordered passenger cars from SWS. As early as 1906, the 1,000th item of rolling stock left the SWS workshop, and in 1909 the 2,000th vehicle was delivered to SBB.

In 1917, SWS took over the lift manufacturing business from the firm Aufzüge- und Räderfabrik Seebach AG and in 1928 the company name was changed to Schweizerische Wagons- und Aufzügefabrik AG, Schlieren-Zürich.

In 1956 it was announced that Pars Finanz AG – then the holding company of the Schindler Group, which was involved in lift manufacturing and carriage building – had purchased 30% of SWS's share capital. In 1958, Schlieren installed the fastest lift at the time, with speed of 5 m/s (16 ft/s), in the Atomium building in Brussels. The Schindler Group took over the "Wagi" completely in 1960, and integrated the company into the group as a subsidiary.

When the Swiss rolling stock manufacturing industry was restructured in 1980–1981, SWS changed its rolling stock specialisation to component manufacturing, as well as alterations and revisions. In lift manufacture, the company focused on standard doors and standard cabins. In 1983, Schindler Group announced that SWS would be closed. At the end of August 1985, the closure took place, amidst vehement protests by employees and the public.

On the former premises of SWS, which were demolished very soon afterwards, a large new building was constructed, to house a new printing works for the Neue Zürcher Zeitung (NZZ). Other new buildings constructed on the site were, for the most part, taken up by small businesses.

Schindler continues to manufacture lifts today, and is the core product of that company, along with escalators and moving walkways. The railway division was divested in 1997 and became part of ADtranz; Schindler's Altenrhein plant (formerly Flug- und Fahrzeugwerke Altenrhein) was not included in the transaction and instead was sold to Stadler Rail.
