= Travers–Buttes railway =

Railway line in Switzerland

Travers–Buttes
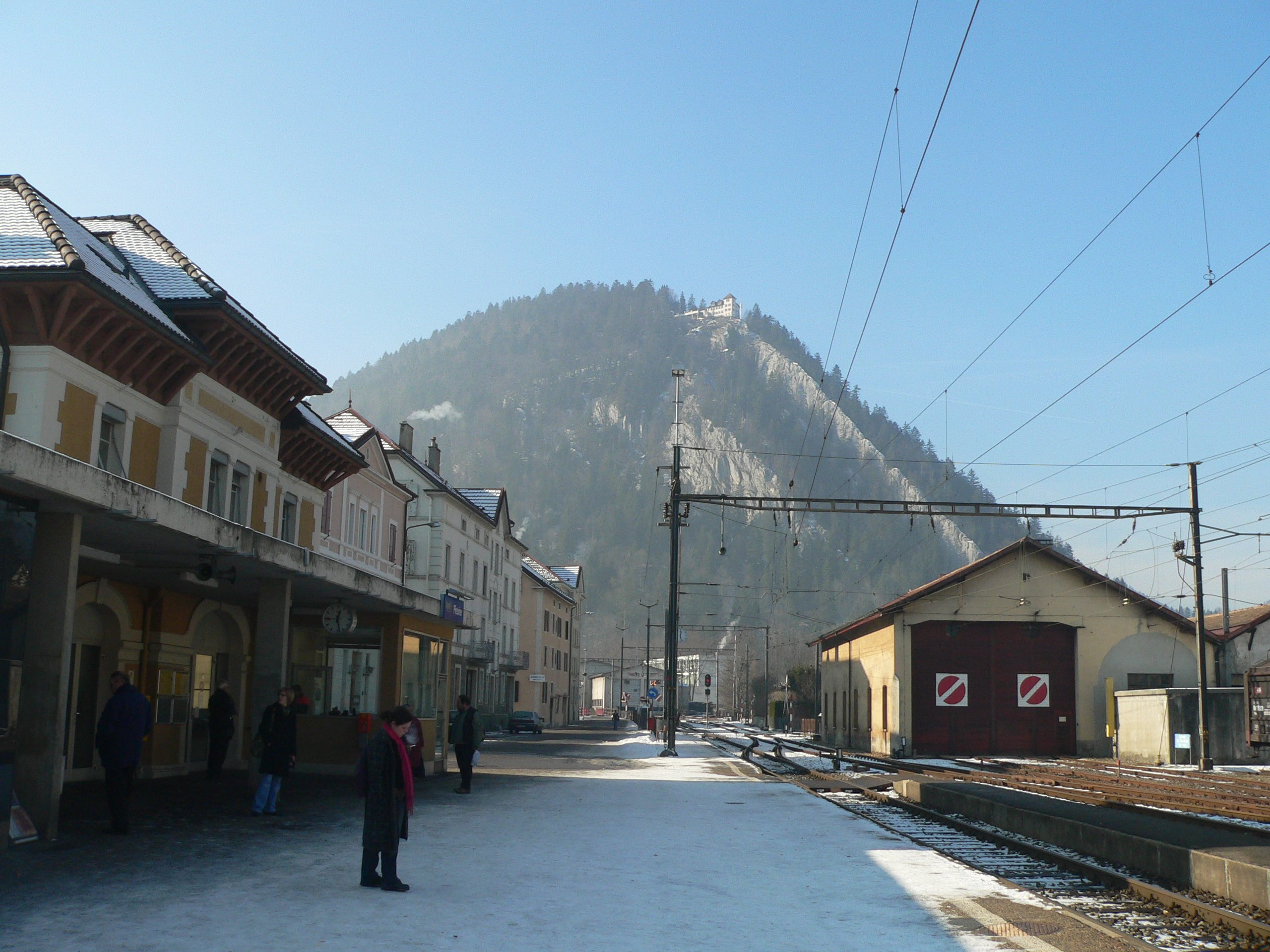
- Fleurier station

Overview
- Owner: Transports publics Neuchâtelois
- Line number: 221
- Termini: Travers; Buttes

Technical
- Line length: 13.59 km (8.44 mi)
- Number of tracks: 1
- Track gauge: 1,435 mm (4 ft 8 1/2 in) standard gauge
- Electrification: 15 kV/16.7 Hz AC overhead catenary
- Maximum incline: 1.5%

The Travers–Buttes railway is a railway line in the Swiss canton of Neuchâtel. It was built by the Régional du Val-de-Travers (RVT), officially the Compagnie du Chemin de fer Régional du Val-de-Travers (Val-de-Travers Regional Railway Company), which operated an almost 14 km-long Y-shaped RVT line from Travers via Fleurier to St-Sulpice and Buttes. Today the line is owned and operated by the Transports publics Neuchâtelois.

== History ==
The Compagnie du Chemin de fer régional du Val-de-Travers was founded in Fleurier in 1881 with the aim of providing rail access to the villages in the Val de Travers.

Although the Franco-Swiss Company (Compagnie Franco-Suisse) had already opened a railway line through the Val-de-Travers on 25 July 1860, this ran through the higher ground of the valley of Les Verrières and on to Pontarlier. In order to reach the necessary altitude, the line was built from Travers on a hillside, far from the settlements on the valley floor. The line of the Régional du Val-de-Travers was therefore built largely parallel to that of the Franco-Suisse and ran on the valley floor from Travers. The Travers–Fleurier railway was opened to St-Sulpice (the seat of the company and the location of the depot) on 24 September 1883. The Fleurier–Buttes railway was opened on 11 September 1886.

When the RVT was founded, the Franco-Suisse already had changed its name for the second time due to mergers and was called the Jura–Simplon Railways (Jura-Simplon-Bahn, JS) when it was nationalised to become part of the Swiss Federal Railways (SBB) in 1903, but the RVT still retained its original name.

The shortage of coal during the Second World War led to the virtual complete electrification of the Swiss railway network. Travers station lies on the (Neuchâtel–)Auvernier–Les Verrières route, on which was electrification was completed on 22 November 1942. The RVT adopted the SBB electrification system (15 kV 16 2/3 Hz) and began electrical operations on its line on 4 May 1944. The final step to electric traction was marked at the RVT with the demolition of its last steam locomotive in 1951.

On the basis of the so-called Privatbahnhilfegesetz (private railway assistance act), the rolling stock was renewed around 1965. In accordance with the concept for standardized types of rolling stock developed by the Federal Office of Transport (EAV) and the Swiss rolling stock industry, the RVT procured a so-called EAV-Triebwagen ("EAV railcar", which was numbered 103), three matching control cars (201–203) and two standard cars, class 1 (Einheitswagen I, nos 301–302), that made possible the operation of push-pull trains.

Passenger operations on the more than 1.6 kilometre-long Fleurier–St-Sulpice section was finally abandoned on 2 June 1973 and they were replaced by a bus route. Since then the former branch line to Buttes has formed the last part of the RVT main line. The line to St-Sulpice, where an RVT carriage shed once stood, was officially retained for goods traffic and service traffic. The catenary was dismantled in 2001.

The disused section was revived for its 100th anniversary in 1983 to carry nostalgic trips, which benefitted from the founding of the Vapeur Val-de-Travers (VVT) steam railway club in 1984. The VVT now maintains the depot at the end of the line in St-Sulpice and uses the line for steam rides. The concession for the Fleurier–St-Sulpice section was transferred to the Vapeur Val-de-Travers in 2012.

Parallel with the gradually introduction of the integrated regular interval timetable starting from 1980, two new railcars were procured, which corresponded to those of the new BLS push-pull trains and were procured for cost reasons by various private railways in pooled orders. Two Privatbahn-NPZ railcars (Neuer Pendelzug—"new push-pull train"—for private railways; 104–105) with two driver's cabs, which were delivered in 1983, replaced the 1965 EAV railcar 103, which was sold to the Martigny–Orsières Railway (Chemins de fer Martigny–Orsières; MO), but the EAV control cars (202–203) were reused with the new railcars.

Between 1985 and 1991, additional rolling stock was procured, including two newer Privatbahn-NPZ sets (106–107) with only one cab, three matching control cars (204–206) and four new intermediate cars (304–307). The RABDe 104 was sold to the Gruyère–Fribourg–Morat Railway (Chemins de fer fribourgeois Gruyère–Fribourg–Morat; GFM). In 1991, BLS sold its three ABDe 4/8 railcars (741–743) to the Oensingen-Balsthal Railway (Oensingen-Balsthal-Bahn; OeBB), which in turn sold no. 743 to the RVT in 1994, which renumbered it 313 under a new numbering scheme.

In 1999, RVT was merged with neighbouring companies, in which the canton of Neuchâtel also held considerable holdings—the Chemins de fer des Montagnes Neuchâteloises railway company and the Compagnie des Transports du Val-de-Ruz (VR) bus company, formerly the Régional du Val-de-Ruz (VR) railway company, to form the Transports Régionaux Neuchâtelois (TRN). The TRN merged with the Compagnie des Transports en commun de Neuchâtel et environs in 2012 to form the Transports publics Neuchâtelois, the current operator.

== Rolling stock ==
The RVT tended to match its rolling stock purchases with that of the neighbouring standard-gauge private railways. Some rolling stock therefore either formed part of follow-up orders, originate from joint orders coordinated by the Federal Office of Transport or were "exchanged" with other companies.

Model class		Manufacturer	Build year	Origin	Quantity		Scrapped	Remarks
Class	Number	Manufacturer	Build year	Origin	total	current	Scrapped	Remarks
Locomotives
Be 4/4	(301)1	ACMV/SAAS	1952		1	hist.1		Historical stock
Rail cars
BCFe 2/4; ABDe 2/4	(311)101	SWS/BBC	1944		2	hist.1	2006	Dismantled
BCFe 2/4; ABDe 2/4	(312)102	SWS/BBC	1945		2	hist.1		Historical vehicle
ABDe 4/4	103	SIG/SWS; SAAS/BBC/MFO	1965		1	0	1983	EAV railcars; sold to MO
ABDe 537	313	SIG/SAAS	1946	BN (1994)	(used) 1	0	2005	"Blauer Pfeil"; ex BN 743; donated
RABDe 4/4	104	SIG/SWS/BBC	1983		2	0	1991	KTU-NPZ; sold to GFM
RABDe 4/4	(315)105	SIG/SWS/BBC	1983		2	0	2013	KTU-NPZ; sold to Travys
RBDe 4/4	(316)106		1985		2	1		KTU-NPZ; rented to TPF (2004–2013)
RBDe 4/4	(317)107		1991		2	1	2018	KTU-NPZ; sold to DSF
RABe 527	321–322	BT/Alstom	2002–2003		1	0	2008–2009	Nina; sold to BLS
RABe 527	331	STAG	2007		3	3		Flirt
RABe 527	332–333	STAG	2009		3	3		Flirt
Control cars
Bt	201	SWP	1964		3	0	1985	EAV (EW I); sold to MO
Bt	202	SWP	1964/1983		3	0	2013	EAV (EW I); sold to Travys
Bt	203	SWP	1964/1983		3	0	1992	EAV (EW I); sold to GFM
ABt	204		1985		3	1		KTU-NPZ; rented to TPF (2004–2013)
ABt	205		1991		3	1	2018	KTU-NPZ; sold to DSF
ABt	206		1991		3	1	2006	KTU-NPZ; sold to TPF
Passenger carriages
B	301	FFA	1965		2	1	2013	EW I; sold to Travys
B	302	FFA	1965/2005		2	1		EW I; rebuilt as B Jumbo
B	304	SWP/SIG	1985		4	1	2008	"B Lego"; sold / sold/rented to Travys?
B	305–306	SWP/SIG	1992		4	1	2018	"B Lego"; sold to DSF
B	307	SWP/SIG	1992		4	1		"B Lego"
Shunting locomotives
Te 4/4	11	SWS/BBC	1910/1949	MO (1966)	(used)1	0	1978	ex MO BCFe 4/4 1; transferred to CJ
used= used vehicle acquired from third party

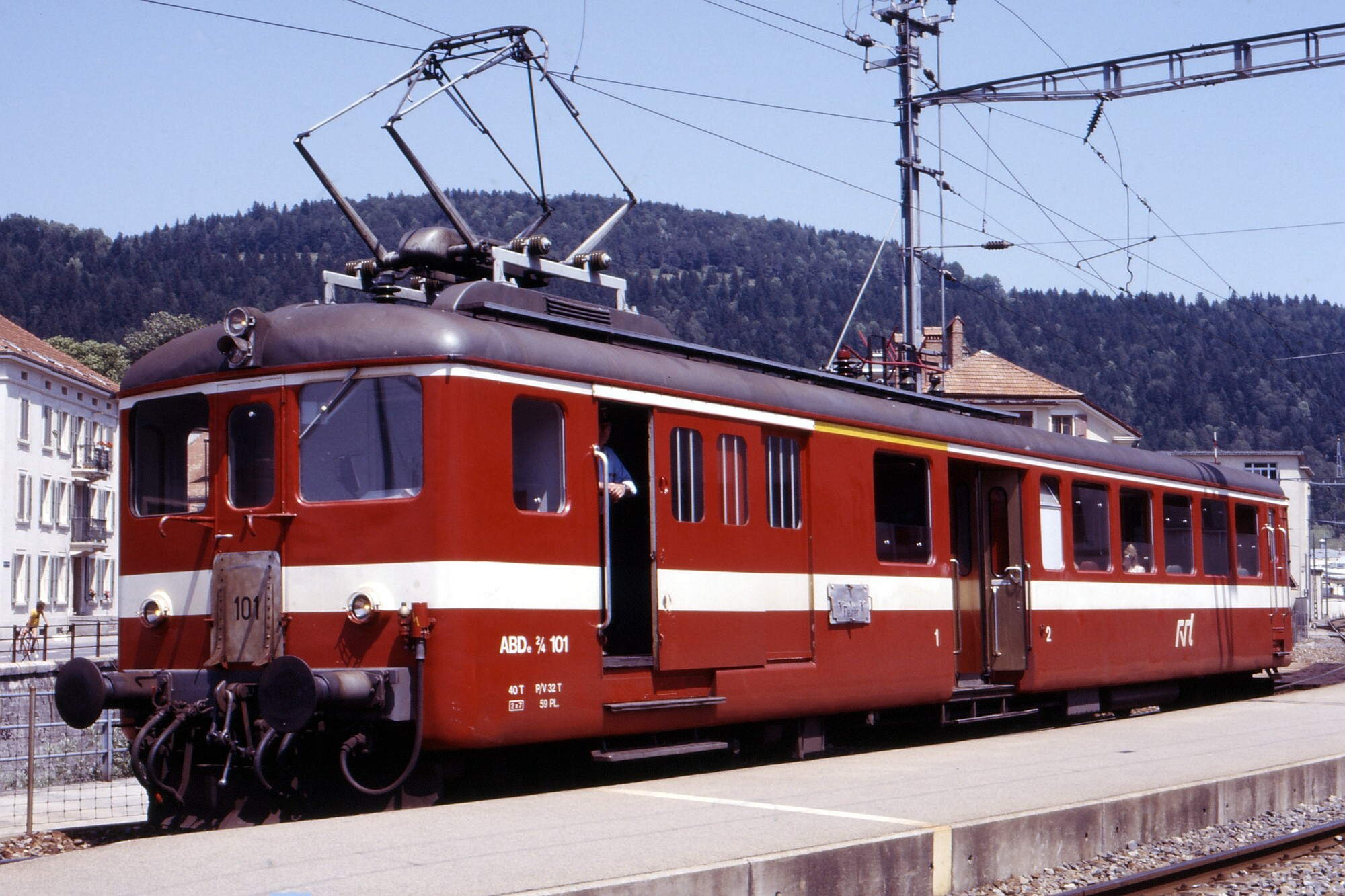
ABDe 2/4 101 in Couvet

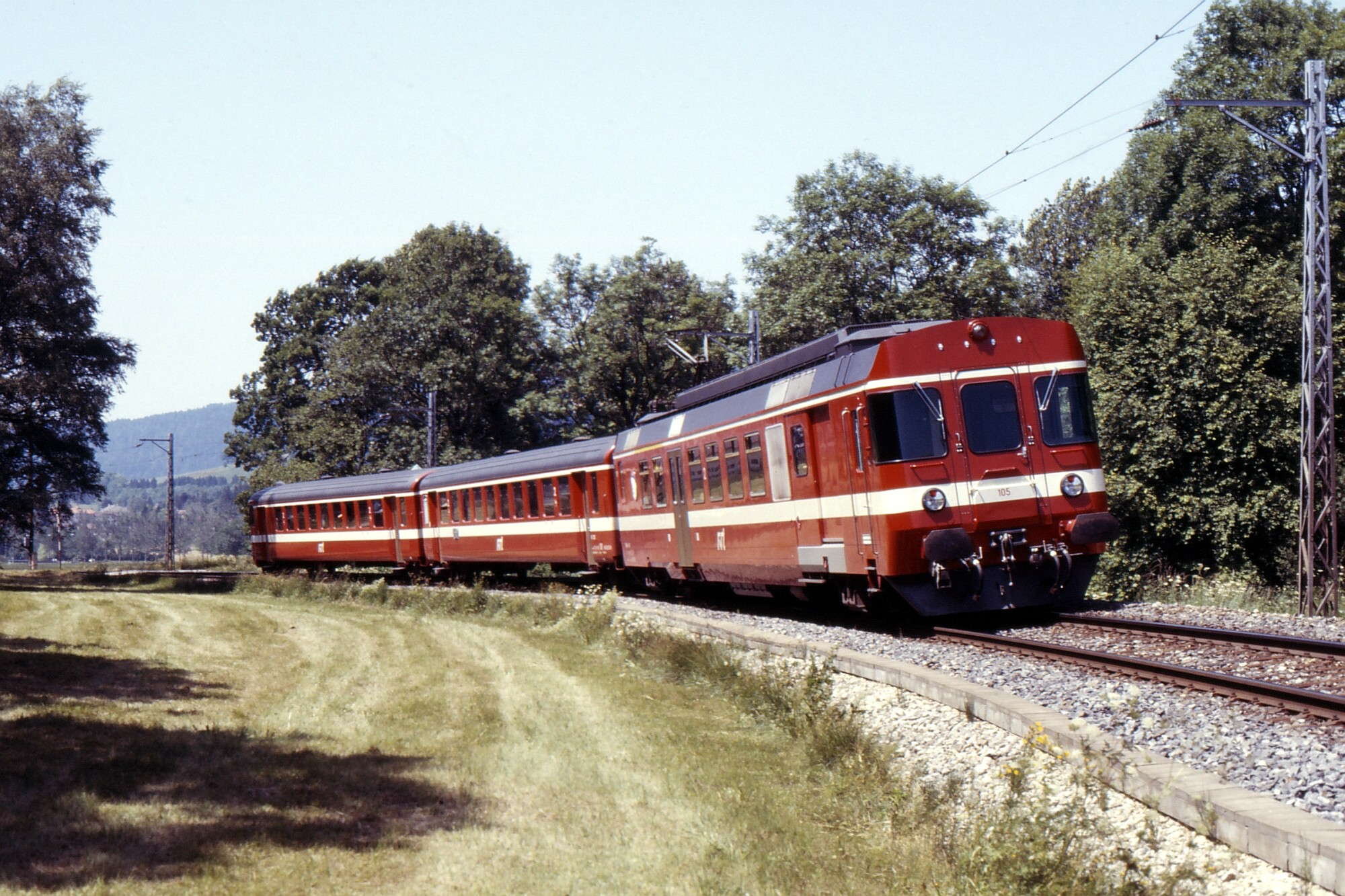
Historic push-pull train between Môtiers and Couvet (1984)
