= Buttes railway station =

Railway station in Val-de-Travers, Switzerland

Buttes
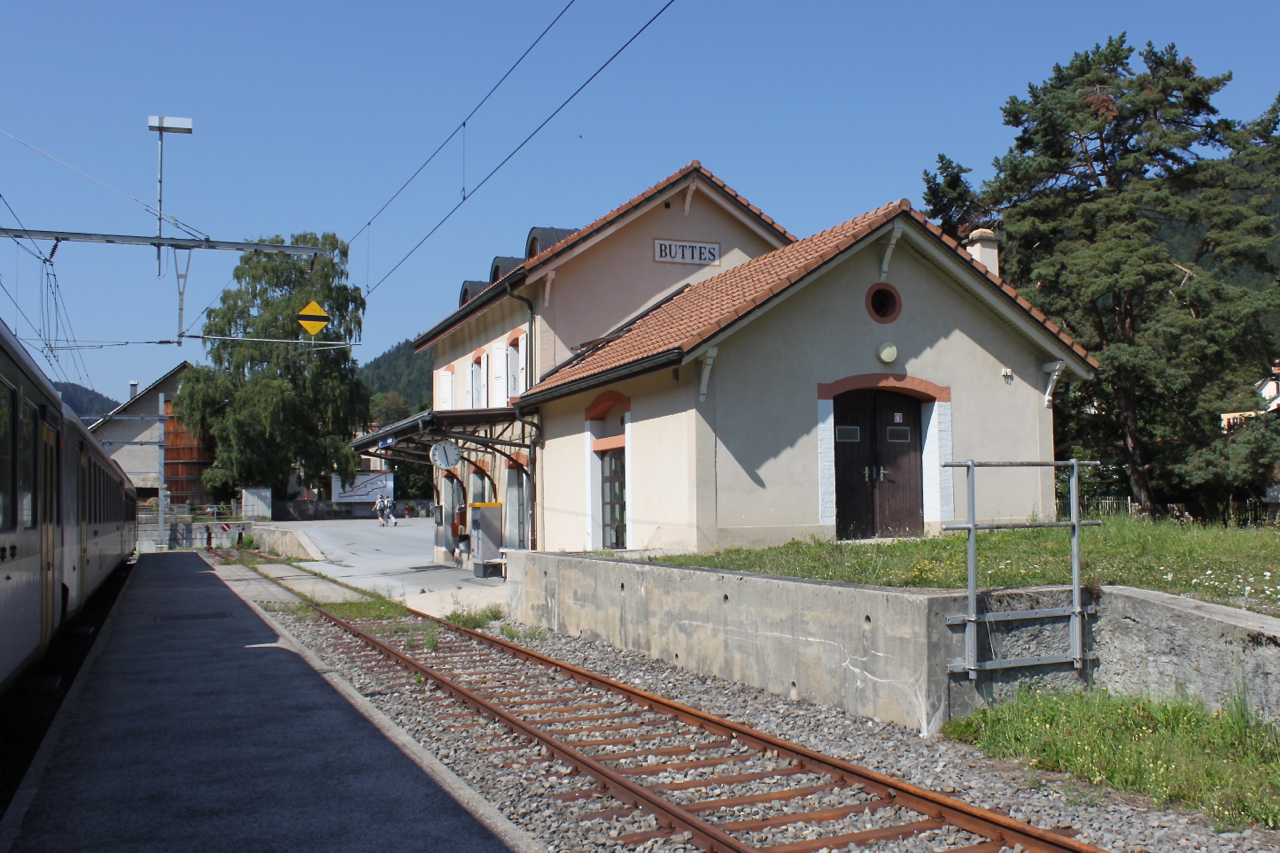
- The station in 2009

General information
- Location: Val-de-Travers; Switzerland
- Coordinates: 46°53′17″N 6°33′14″E
- Elevation: 769 m (2,523 ft)
- Owner: Transports publics Neuchâtelois
- Line: Travers–Buttes line
- Distance: 12.0 km (7.5 mi) from Travers
- Platforms: 2 side platforms
- Tracks: 2
- Train operators: Transports publics Neuchâtelois
- Connections: CarPostal SA bus line

Construction
- Accessible: Yes

Other information
- Station code: 8504288 (BT)
- Fare zone: 33 (Onde Verte)

Services
Preceding station	Transports publics Neuchâtelois	Following station
Terminus	R21	Fleurier towards Neuchâtel
Location
- Location within Switzerland Location within Canton of Neuchâtel

Buttes railway station (French: Gare de Buttes) is a railway station in the municipality of Val-de-Travers, in the Swiss canton of Neuchâtel. It is the western terminus of the standard gauge Travers–Buttes line of Transports publics Neuchâtelois.

== Services ==
As of the December 2023 timetable change, the following services stop at Buttes:

- Regio: half-hourly service to Neuchâtel.
