= Transports publics Neuchâtelois =

Transport company in Switzerland

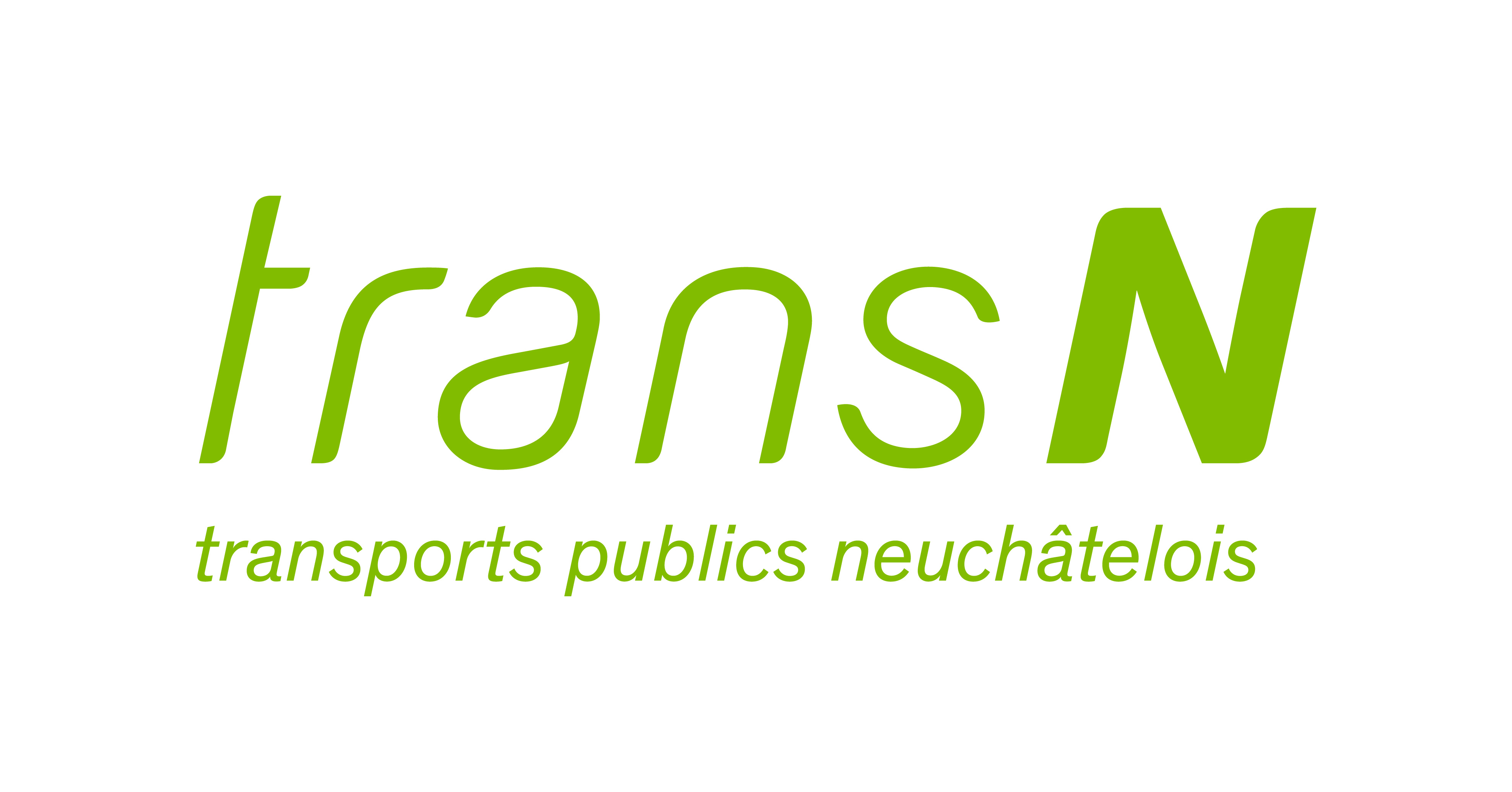

- Industry: Public transport
- Founded: 2012; 13 years ago
- Headquarters: La Chaux-de-Fonds, Switzerland
- Website: www.transn.ch

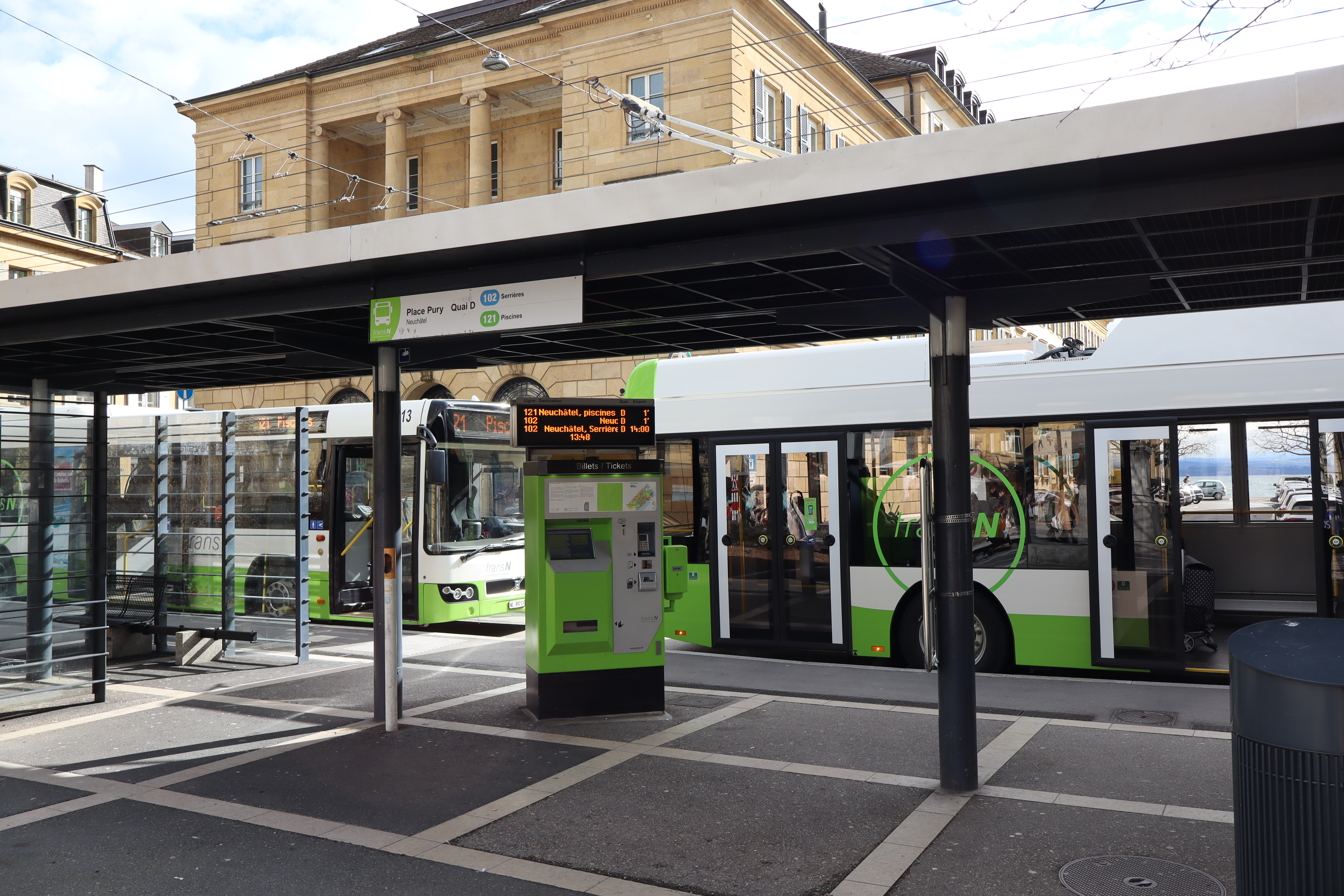
Buses at Place Pury

Transports publics Neuchâtelois (lit. 'Public transport in Neuchâtel', German: Neuenburgische Verkehrsbetriebe) is a public transport company in western Switzerland. It manages services under the transN brand in the canton of Neuchâtel. It was formed in 2012 through the merger of Transports Régionaux Neuchâtelois (TRN) and TN. It operates regional train services, a suburban tramway line, funiculars, buses, and trolleybuses.

== Railway lines ==
=== Regional trains and tramway ===
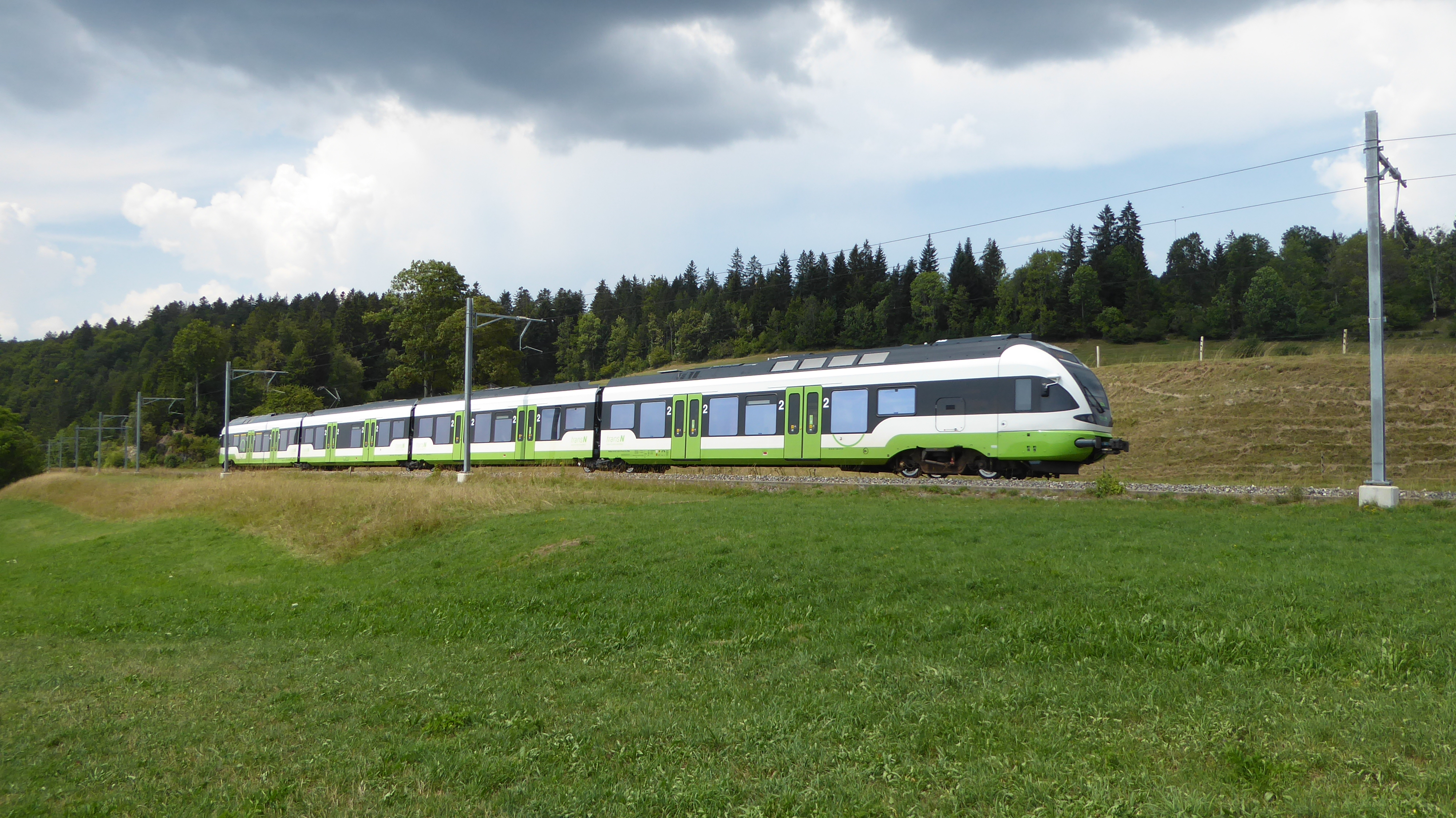
TransN Stadler Flirt

The company owns four railway lines operated by Regio (R) trains:

- Travers–Buttes line, operated by R21
- La Chaux-de-Fonds–Les Ponts-de-Martel line, operated by R22
- Le Locle–Les Brenets line, operated by R24
- Littorail, the Neuchâtel suburban tramway line, operated as R15

=== Funiculars ===
It operates also three funicular lines in the town of Neuchâtel:

- Fun'ambule, linking the lower part of the town, near the University, with Neuchâtel railway station
- Ecluse–Plan
- La Coudre–Chaumont

== Bus lines ==
- Trolleybuses in Neuchâtel
- Trolleybuses in La Chaux-de-Fonds

== See also ==
- Trams in Neuchâtel
- Transport in Switzerland
