= Neuchâtel–Pontarlier railway =

Railway line in Switzerland and France

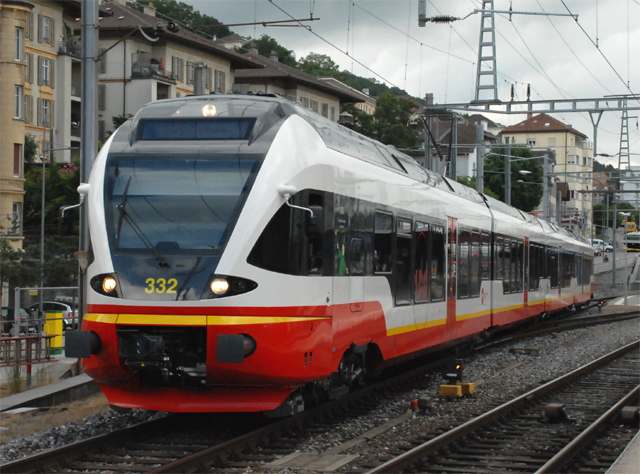
- RABe 527 of the Transports Régionaux Neuchâtelois in Neuchâtel on the way to Travers–Buttes

Overview
- Locale: Switzerland
- Termini: Neuchâtel; Pontarlier

Technical
- Line length: 36.09 km (22.43 mi)
- Number of tracks: 1
- Track gauge: 1,435 mm (4 ft 8 1/2 in)
- Electrification: 15 kV/16.7 Hz AC overhead catenary

The Neuchâtel–Pontarlier railway, also known as the Val-de-Travers line or the Franco-Suisse (Franco-Swiss) line, is a single-track standard-gauge railway line run by the Swiss Federal Railways (SBB) and the French public railway infrastructure company Réseau ferré de France (RFF).

== History ==
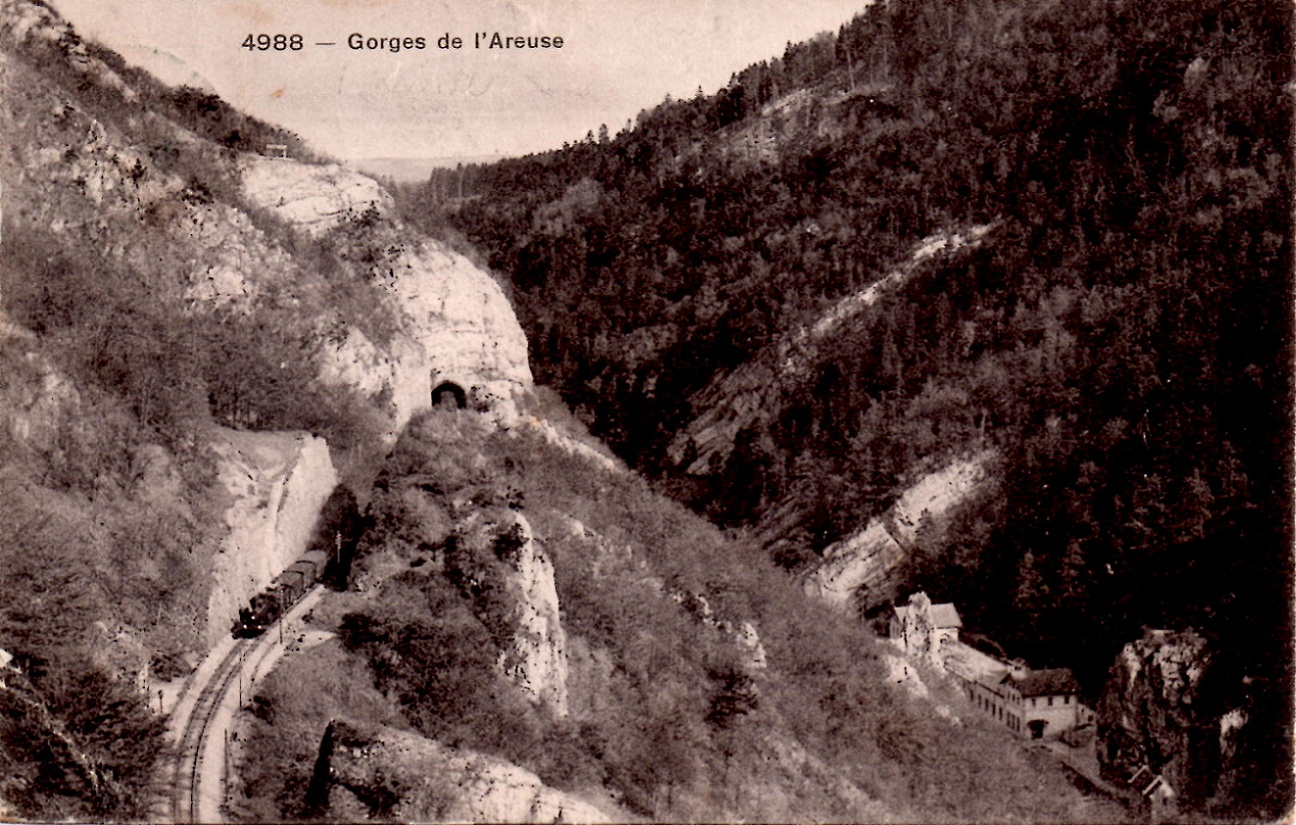
Steam train in the Areuse gorge between Bôle and Champ-du-Moulin

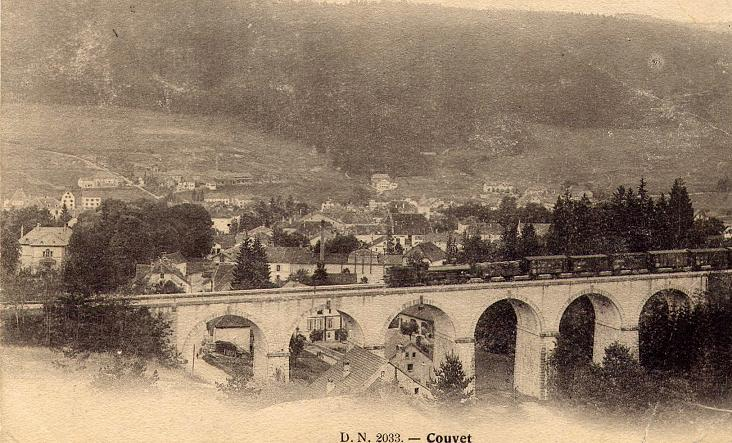
Steam train on the viaduct of Couvet

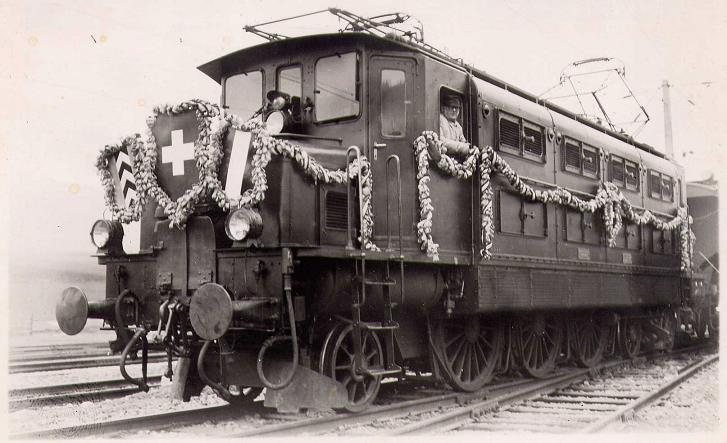
Locomotive Ae 3/6 I 10693 on the occasion of the opening of the electrification between Neuchâtel and Les Verrières

The Auvernier–Pontarlier line was opened on 25 July 1860. Even during the construction, there were disputes where the Neuchâtel railway station should lie. An already built section was abandoned and used instead for the La Chaux-de-Fonds–Neuchâtel railway. The line to the frontier station at Les Verrières belonged to the Franco-Swiss Company (Compagnie Franco-Suisse, FS) and the section from Les Verrières to Pontarlier belonged to the French Chemins de fer de Paris à Lyon et à la Méditerranée (PLM). The section to Auvernier was built as part of the Neuchâtel–Vaumarcus line opened by FS on 7 November 1859. Initially, the PLM was responsible for the operation of the whole line.

The railway played an important role in the Franco-Prussian War, when during January and February 1871, the French Armée de l'Est with 87,000 men under General Bourbaki retreated into Switzerland and were disarmed and interned in Les Verrières. On 22 March when the interned troops were released and were being repatriated by train a collision occurred due to an incorrect setting of points at Colombier. The driver and 22 internees were killed and 72 soldiers were injured, some seriously.

The Swiss section was transferred as a result of a merger on 1 January 1872 to the Western Swiss Railways (Chemins de fer de la Suisse Occidentale, SO) on 28 June 1881 and to the Western Switzerland–Simplon Company (Suisse-Occidentale–Simplon, SOS) and on 1 January 1890 to the Jura–Simplon Railway (Jura-Simplon-Bahn, JS). Due to the nationalisation of the JS on 1 May 1903, the Swiss part of the line was transferred to the Swiss Federal Railways (SBB), which has operated the line electrically at 15,000 V 16.7 Hz since 22 November 1942. Steam locomotives of SNCF took over the operation of trains in Les Verrières for the time being.

The French section of the line was nationalised along with the rest of the PLM on 1 January 1938 and integrated into the SNCF. To speed up the electrification of Les Verrières via Pontarlier to Dole, SNCF received financial support from Switzerland. The section from Les Verrières to Pontarlier has been equipped since 3 June 1956 with the Swiss power system of 15,000 V 16.7 Hz so that the Swiss traction can run through to Pontarlier. Electrical operations commenced with 25,000 V 50 Hz on the line from Pontarlier to Dole on 25 April 1958.

== Route description ==
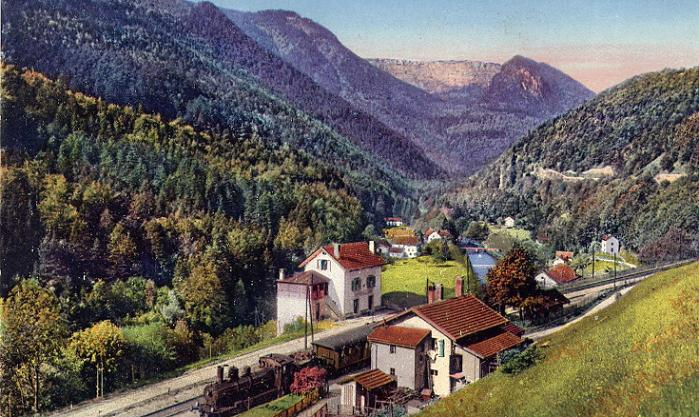
Champ-du-Moulin station with Creux du Van in the background, around 1930

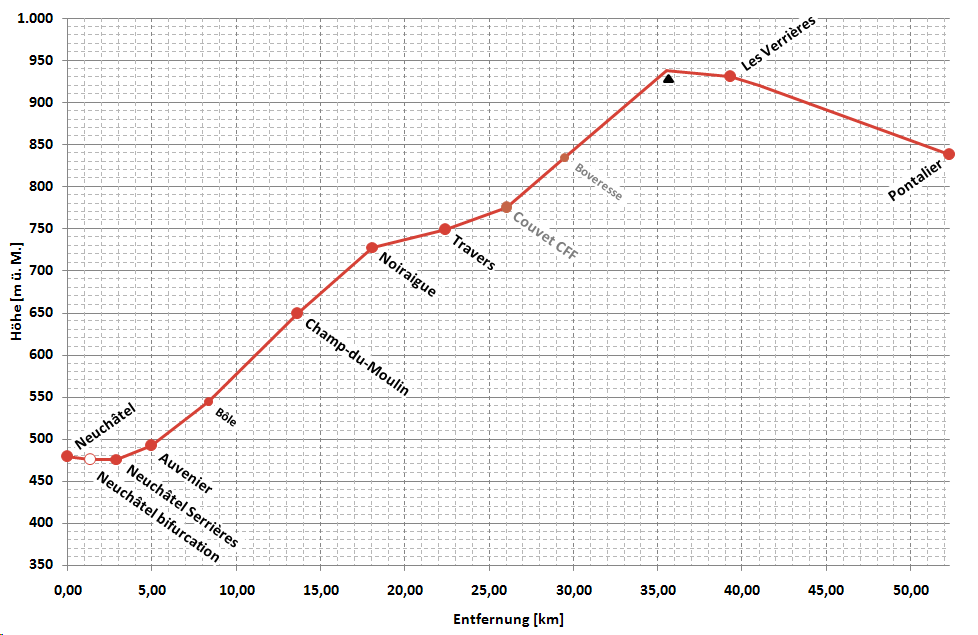
Elevation profile of the Neuchâtel–Pontarlier line

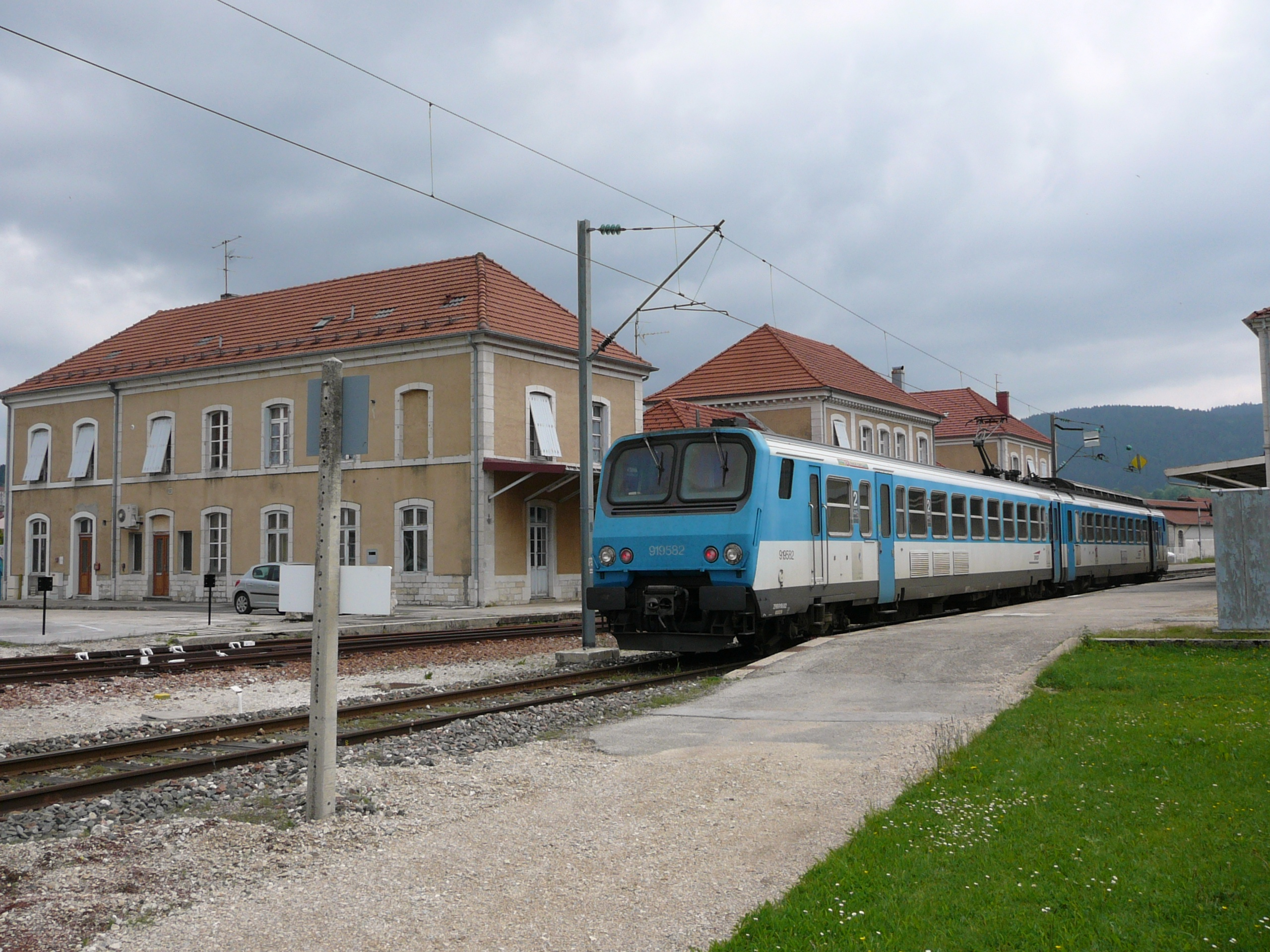
Pontarlier station with Z2 railcar of TER Franche-Comté

Trains travelling to the Val de Travers use the Jura Foot Railway running towards Yverdon as far as Auvernier. The line then runs through the vineyards up to Bôle and provides a good view of Lake Neuchâtel. Continuing up the Areuse gorge, the line passes between rocks and over numerous bridges. Regional trains cross in Champ-du-Moulin station, where it is possible to see the famous Creux du Van. The line continues via Noiraigue to Travers, where most of the trains operated by Transports Régionaux Neuchâtelois branch off on the line to Buttes. The line continues to Pontarlier, past the former stations of Couvet CFF, Boveresse and Les Bayards. All passenger trains pass through Les Verrières without stopping; the border station serves only goods traffic. The trains continue to Pontarlier on French soil, but still using the Swiss electrical system. The electrification changes in Pontarlier station from the Swiss to the French system.

== Operations ==
Three RegioExpress services run each day on the Bern–Neuchâtel–Frasne route with stops in Neuchâtel and Pontarlier, connecting in Frasne with the TGV Lyria trains on the Lausanne–Dijon–Paris Gare de Lyon route. It is operated by SBB Regional using RBDe 562 sets.

In 2018, Regio services, operated in collaboration with Transports Régionaux Neuchâtelois (TRN), ran every 30 minutes on the Neuchâtel–Travers section, continuing over the Régional du Val-de-Travers line to Fleurier and Buttes. During peak hours, additional services run, using TRN RABe 527 sets and SBB Domino trains.

The Les Verrières–Pontarlier section is the only line that is operated by the French infrastructure manager RFF that is electrified on the 15,000 V 16.7 Hz system. It is therefore used for test runs of multi-system rolling stock. As a result, the four-system Thalys high-speed sets and a variant of the Prima electric locomotive were tested on it under 16.7 Hz power when new.
