= Areuse =

River in canton of Neuchâtel, Switzerland

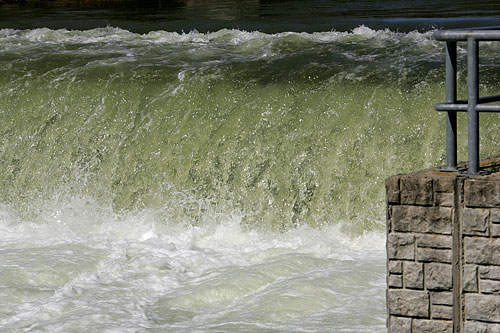

Location
- Country: Switzerland

Physical characteristics
- Mouth: Lake Neuchâtel
  - location: Between Boudry and Cortaillod
  - coordinates: 46°56′44″N 6°52′15″E
  - elevation: 431 m
- Length: 31 km (19 mi)
- Basin size: 405 km²

The Areuse is the principal river of the canton of Neuchâtel, flowing through the districts of Val-de-Travers and Boudry. It is attested as Orose in 1107, Arosa in 1280, and La Reuse in 1595.

The river rises as a vauclusian spring at La Doux, near Saint-Sulpice (NE), fed by resurgence from the La Brévine valley (Lac des Taillères) and the eastern part of the Verrières syncline, at an elevation of 799 m. It flows 31 km before emptying into Lake Neuchâtel at the boundary of the municipalities of Boudry and Cortaillod, at 431 m.

== Hydrology and water supply ==
The Areuse drains a catchment area of 405 km², supplying drinking water to 70% of the Neuchâtel population. The main water intakes are at Champ-du-Moulin (established 1887, for the city of Neuchâtel), Les Moyats (for La Chaux-de-Fonds), and Treymont (for Boudry).

== Gorges and nature reserve ==
Between Noiraigue and Boudry, the river descends 270 m through gorges located within the Creux du Van Natural Reserve of fauna and flora. The gorges have been accessible via a trail network since 1875. Navigation on the river was prohibited in 1943, though fishing has been permitted since the Middle Ages.

== River corrections ==
Major river correction works were carried out from 1867 to 1869 and again from 1949 to 1984.

== Industrial use ==
The hydraulic energy of the Areuse has been exploited throughout its history by a succession of waterside enterprises along its course:

- Saint-Sulpice: mills (one cited in 1337), a paper mill (1677), an oil mill, sawmill, fulling mill, batting mill, dyeworks, forge, cement works (1879), wood-pulp factory (1884), and electric power stations.
- Môtiers: mills (1513), sawmill (1513), and a fish hatchery (1891).
- Couvet: mills and a tannery (1865).
- Travers: a mill (1563), sawmill, and tannery.
- Noiraigue: rolling mills (1858) and cement works (1861).
- Noiraigue–Boudry stretch: six electric power stations.
- Champ-du-Moulin: a mill, nail factory, and powder mill (1722).
- Boudry: a brewery, sawmill, beehive factory, cloth and milaines (mixed-fibre fabric) factory (1860), and straw hat factory (1882).
- Boudry and Cortaillod: from the 18th century onward, printed-cotton (indiennes) factories along the Areuse and the managed channels of its delta.

== Bibliography ==
- E. Quartier-la-Tente, Le canton de Neuchâtel, series 3, 1893–1895; series 2, 1906–1912.
- A. Dubois, Les gorges de l'Areuse et le Creux du Van, 1902.
- A. Burger, Hydrogéologie du bassin de l'Areuse, 1959.
- Les gorges de l'Areuse, 1986.
- W. Müller, «La stratification toponymique dans le canton de Neuchâtel», in Actes du XVIIIe Congrès international de linguistique et philologie romanes, 4, 1989, pp. 617–625.
