= Val-de-Travers =

- Municipality
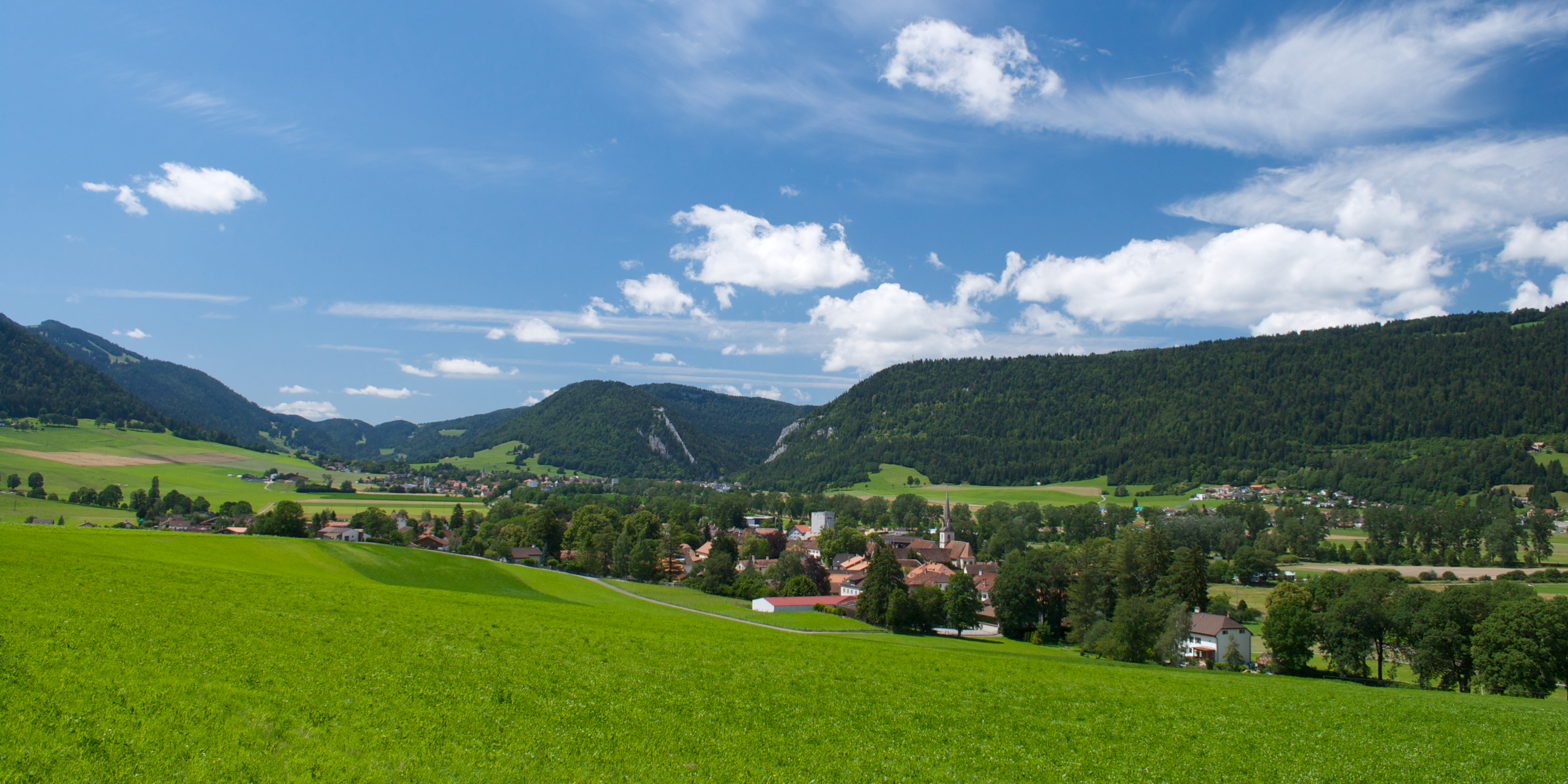

- Coat of arms
- Location of Val-de-Travers
- Location within Switzerland Location within Canton of Neuchâtel
- Coordinates: 46°54′N 6°36′E
- Country: Switzerland
- Canton: Neuchâtel

Area
  - Total: 12.90 km^{2} (4.98 sq mi)
- Elevation: 737 m (2,418 ft)

Population (December 2020)
  - Total: 10,579
  - Density: 820.1/km^{2} (2,124/sq mi)
- Time zone: UTC+01:00 (CET)
  - Summer (DST): UTC+02:00 (CEST)
- Postal code: 2112
- SFOS number: 6512
- ISO 3166 code: CH-NE
- Website: val-de-travers.ch

Val-de-Travers is a municipality in the canton of Neuchâtel in Switzerland. It was created on 1 January 2009, when the former municipalities of Boveresse, Buttes, Couvet, Fleurier, Les Bayards, Môtiers, Noiraigue, Saint-Sulpice and Travers merged to form Val-de-Travers.

The region is known for its production of absinthe.

== History ==
Val-de-Travers is first mentioned in 1150 as Vallis traversis.

== Geography ==
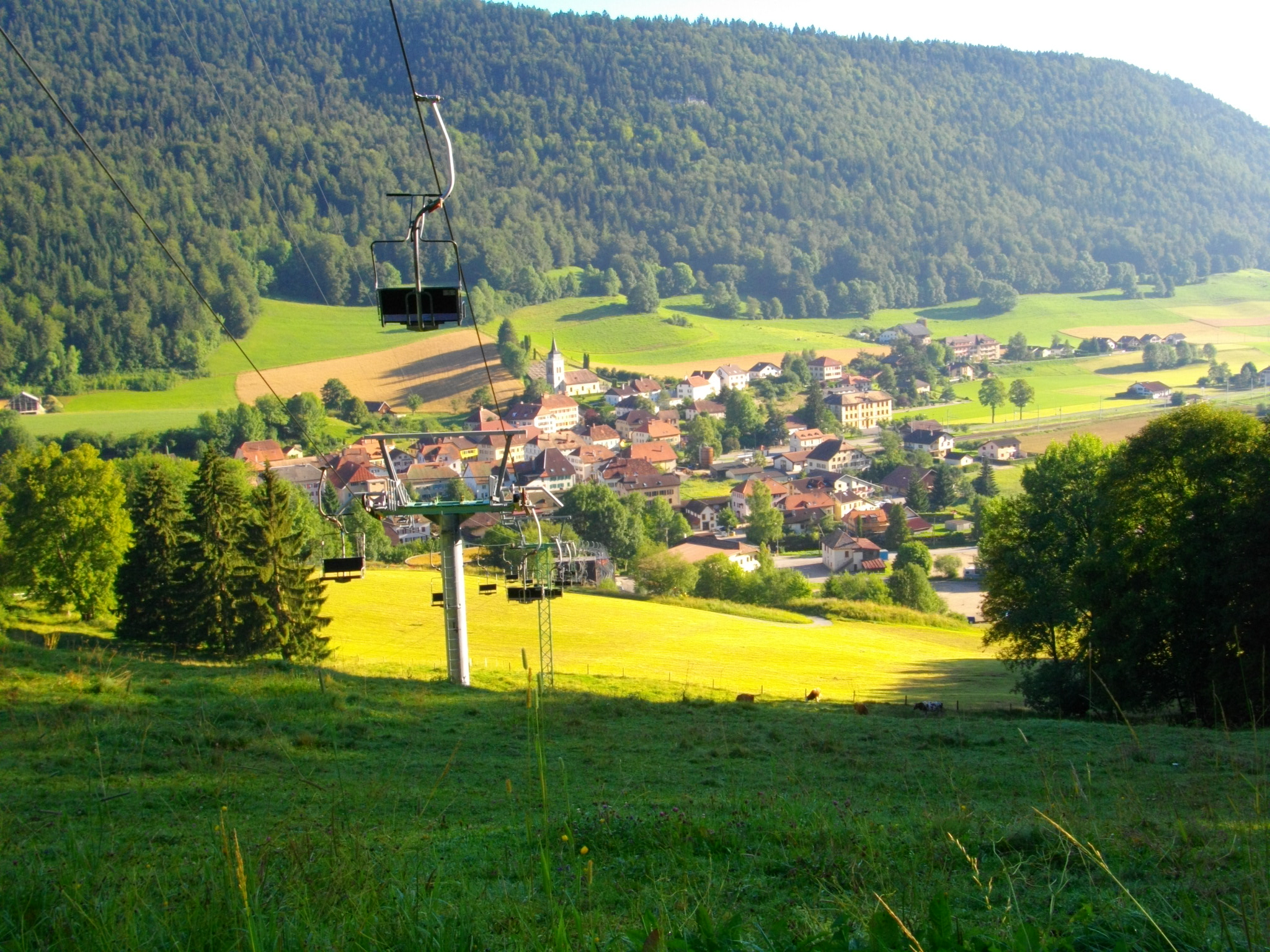
Môtiers, capital of Val-de-Travers

Aerial view from by Walter Mittelholzer (1919)

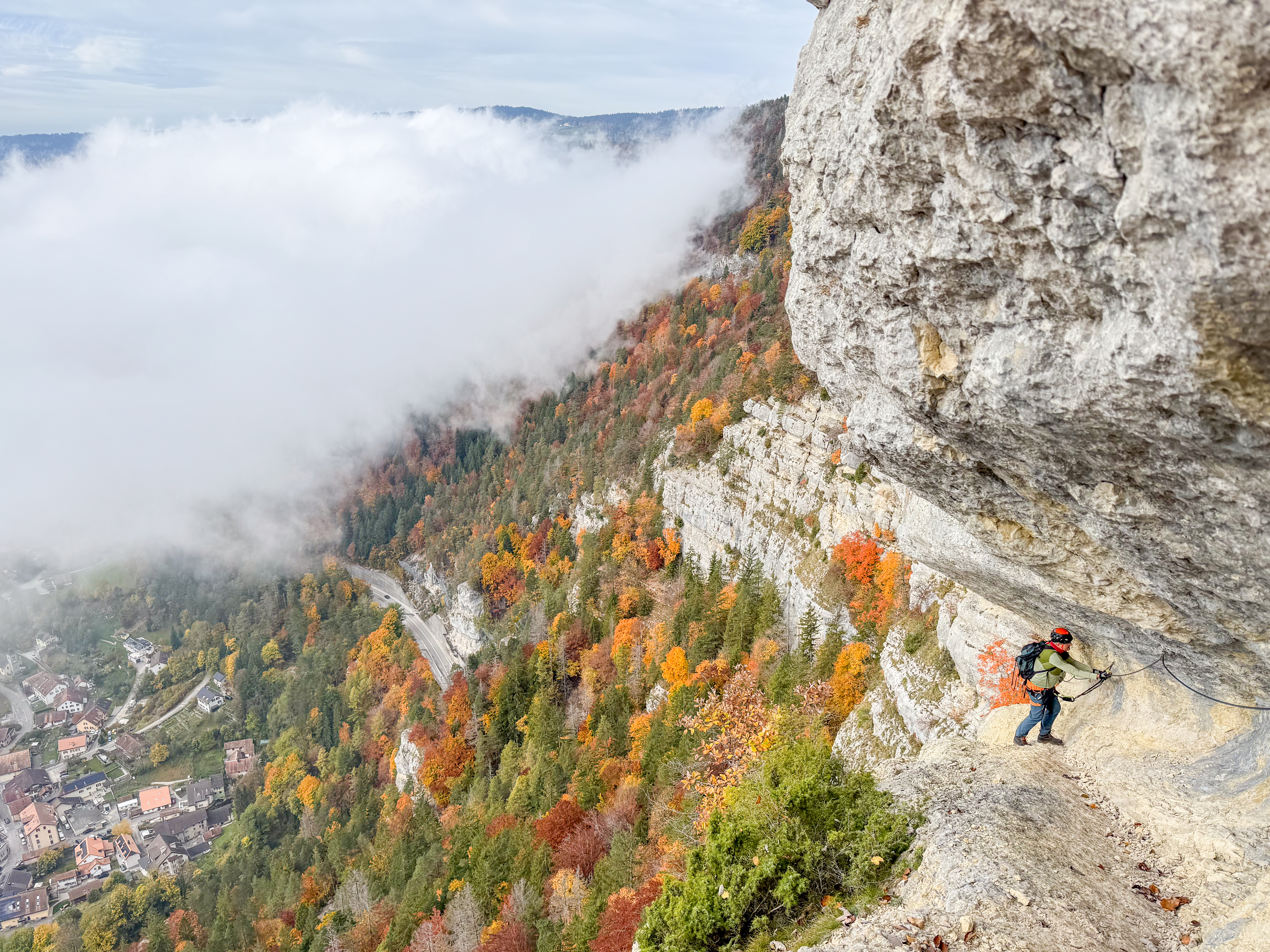
Via Ferrata du Tichodrome

Val-de-Travers has an area of 124.9 square kilometers (48.2 mi^{2}). Of this area, in 2009 52.92 km^{2} (20.43 mi^{2}) or 42.4% was used for agricultural purposes, while 63.24 km^{2} (24.42 mi^{2}) or 50.6% was forested. Of the rest of the land, 7.54 km^{2} (2.91 mi^{2}) or 6.0% is settled (buildings or roads), 0.59 km^{2} (0.23 mi^{2}) or 0.5% either rivers or lakes and 0.39 km^{2} (0.15 mi^{2}) or 0.3% is unproductive land.

Of the built-up area, housing and buildings made up 2.5% and transportation infrastructure made up 2.5%. Out of the forested land, 46.8% of the total land area is heavily forested and 3.8% is covered with orchards or small clusters of trees. Of the agricultural land, 5.0% is used for growing crops and 23.9% is pastures and 13.4% is used for alpine pastures. All the water in the municipality is flowing water.

The municipality is located in a valley in the Neuchâtel Jura. The valley provides a connection between the Swiss Plateau and Franche-Comté.

The river L'Areuse (previous called La Reuse, the name morphed into Areuse), flows lengthways of the valley, most of this river is a shallow river, and about 10 meters wide, it narrows into a gorge near Noiraigue. Historically, this river provided much of the water and fish for the valley.

The municipality was located in the Val-de-Travers District, until the district level was eliminated on 1 January 2018.

Môtiers is the main village.

== Demographics ==
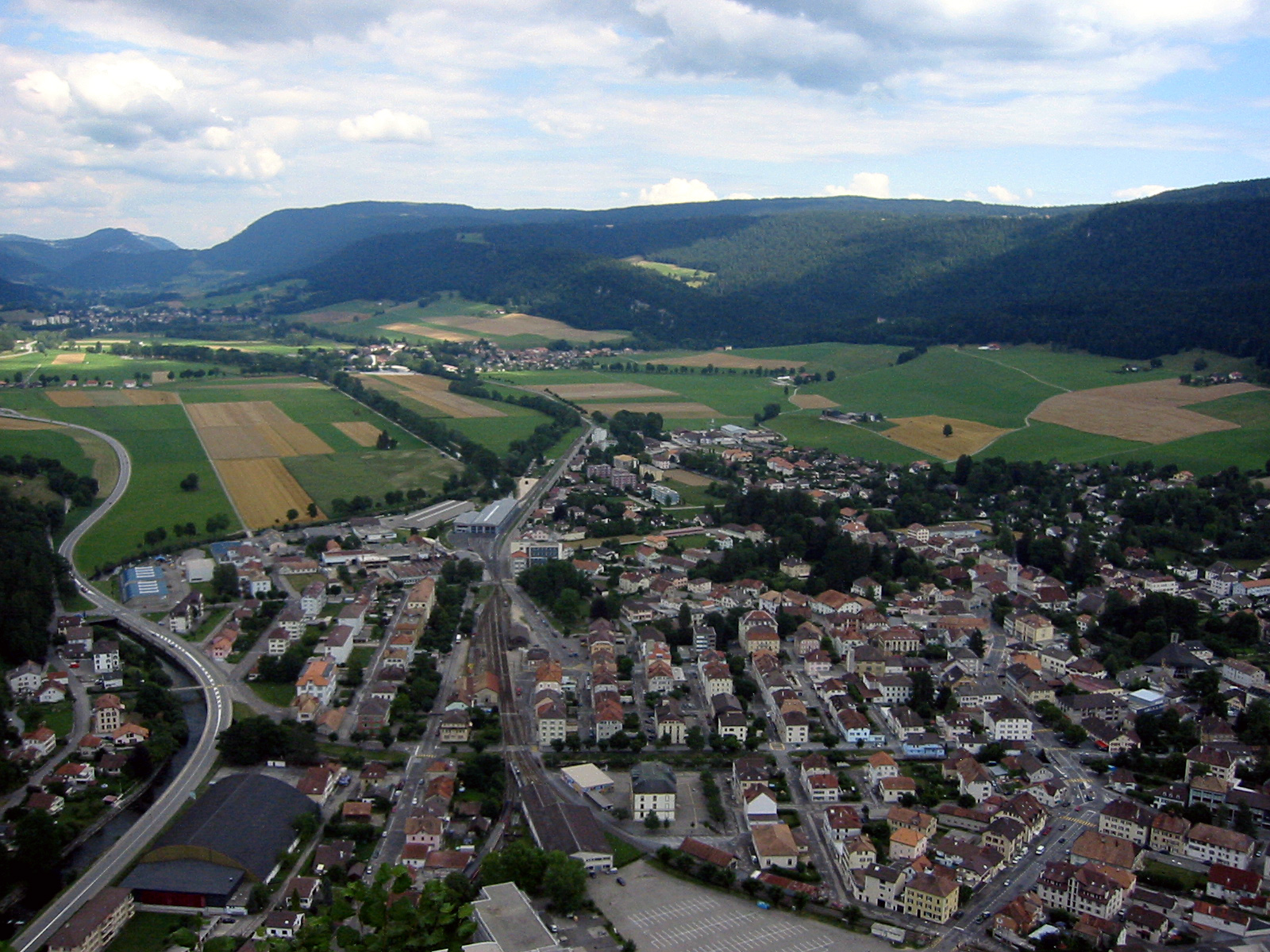
Houses in Fleurier village

Val-de-Travers had a population (as of December 2020) of 10,579. As of 2008, 18.0% of the population are resident foreign nationals. In the 10 years (2000–2010) the population decreased by 2.5%. Migration accounted for -1.8% whilst births and deaths accounted for -1.6%.

Most of the population (as of 2000) speaks French (88.9%) as their first language, Italian is the second most common (3.0%) and German is the third (2.7%).

As of 2008 the population was 48.6% male and 51.4% female. The population was made up of 4,161 Swiss men (38.4% of the population) and 1,103 (10.2%) non-Swiss men. There were 4,677 Swiss women (43.2%) and 891 (8.2%) non-Swiss women.

As of 2000, children and teenagers (0–19 years old) make up 25% of the population, while adults (20–64 years old) make up 55.9% and seniors (over 64 years old) make up 19.1%.

As of 2009, the construction rate of new housing units was 0.6 new units per 1000 residents. The vacancy rate for the municipality, in 2010, was 1.39%.

== Heritage sites of national significance ==
The Farm House no. 1201 or Monlési, the Maison des Chats or Petitpierre, the Séchoir à absinthe, Ivernois Castle and the Maison Boy de la Tour, the Hôtel des Six-Communes, the medieval church of St-Pierre, the Temple in Môtiers and Areuse Bridge are listed as Swiss heritage site of national significance. The villages of Buttes, Les Verrières, Môtiers, Couvet, Fleurier and Travers are all part of the Inventory of Swiss Heritage Sites.

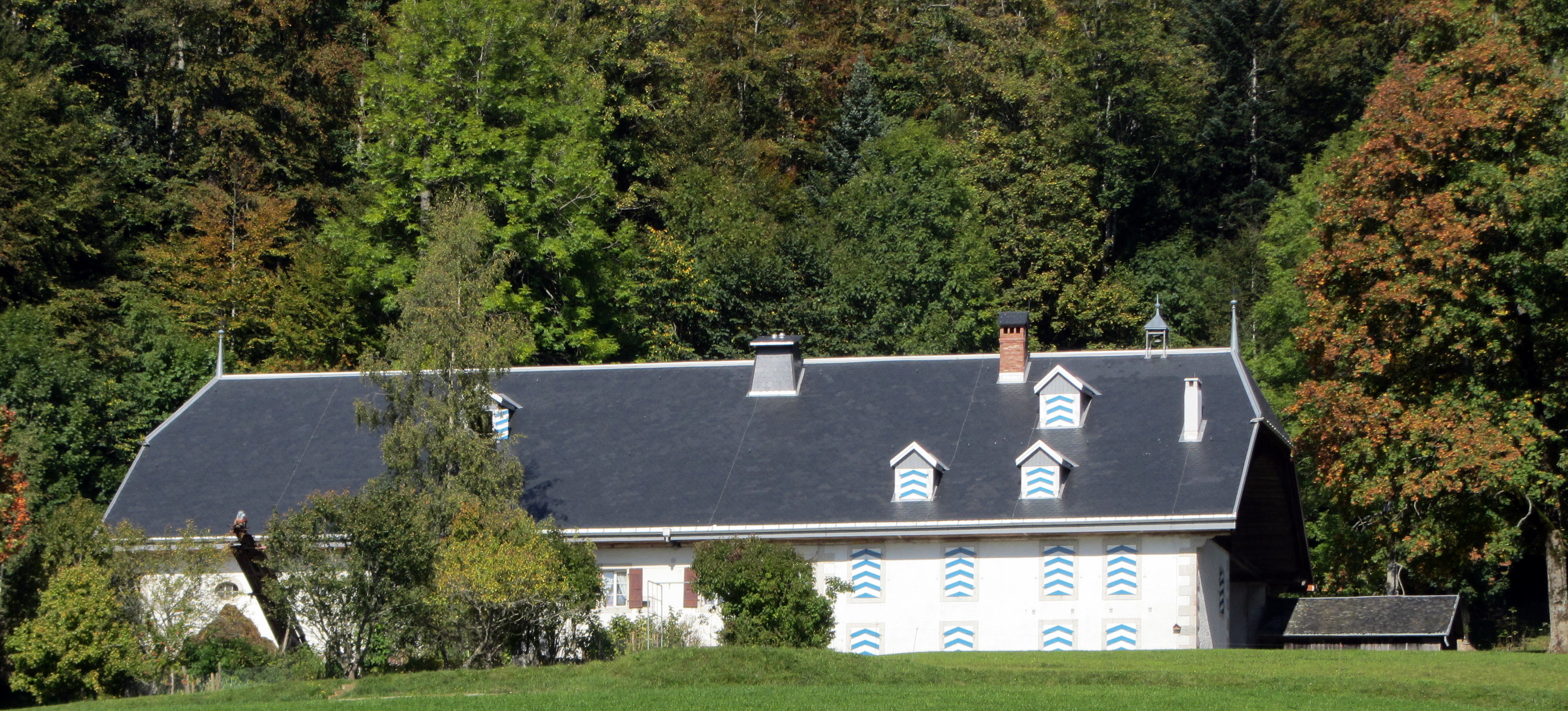
Farm House no. 1201 or Monlési

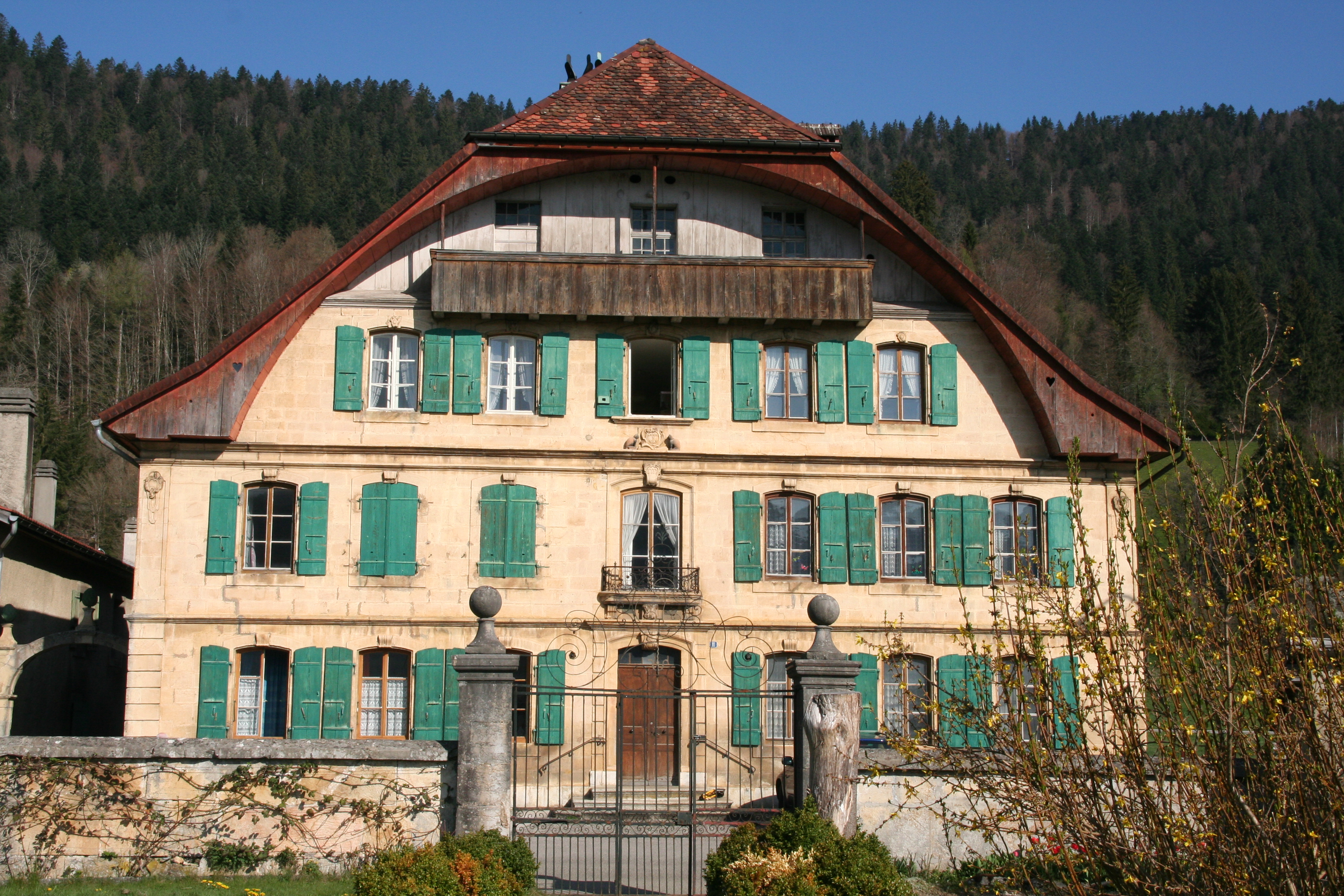
Maison des chats

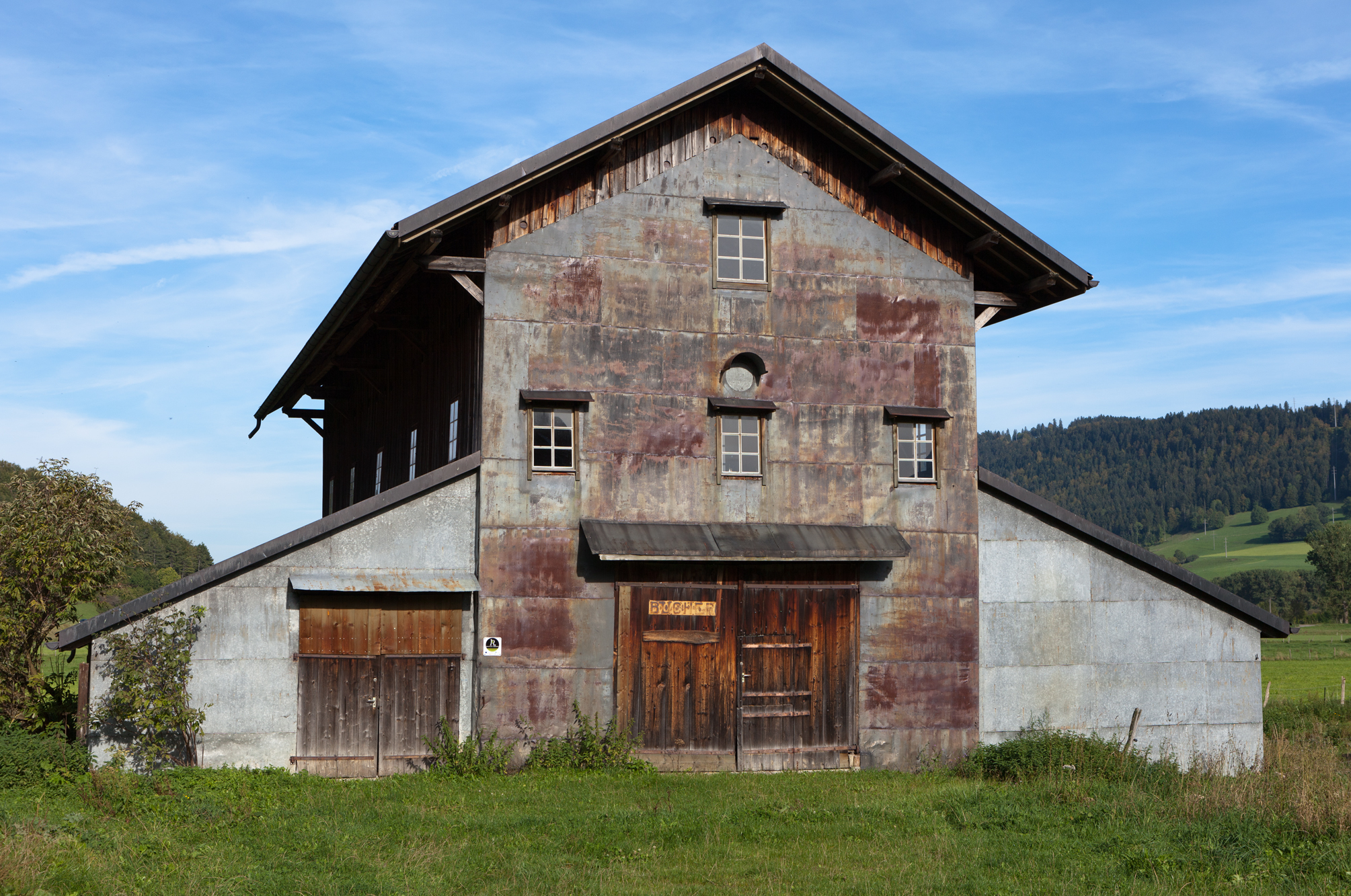
Séchoir à absinthe in Boveresse

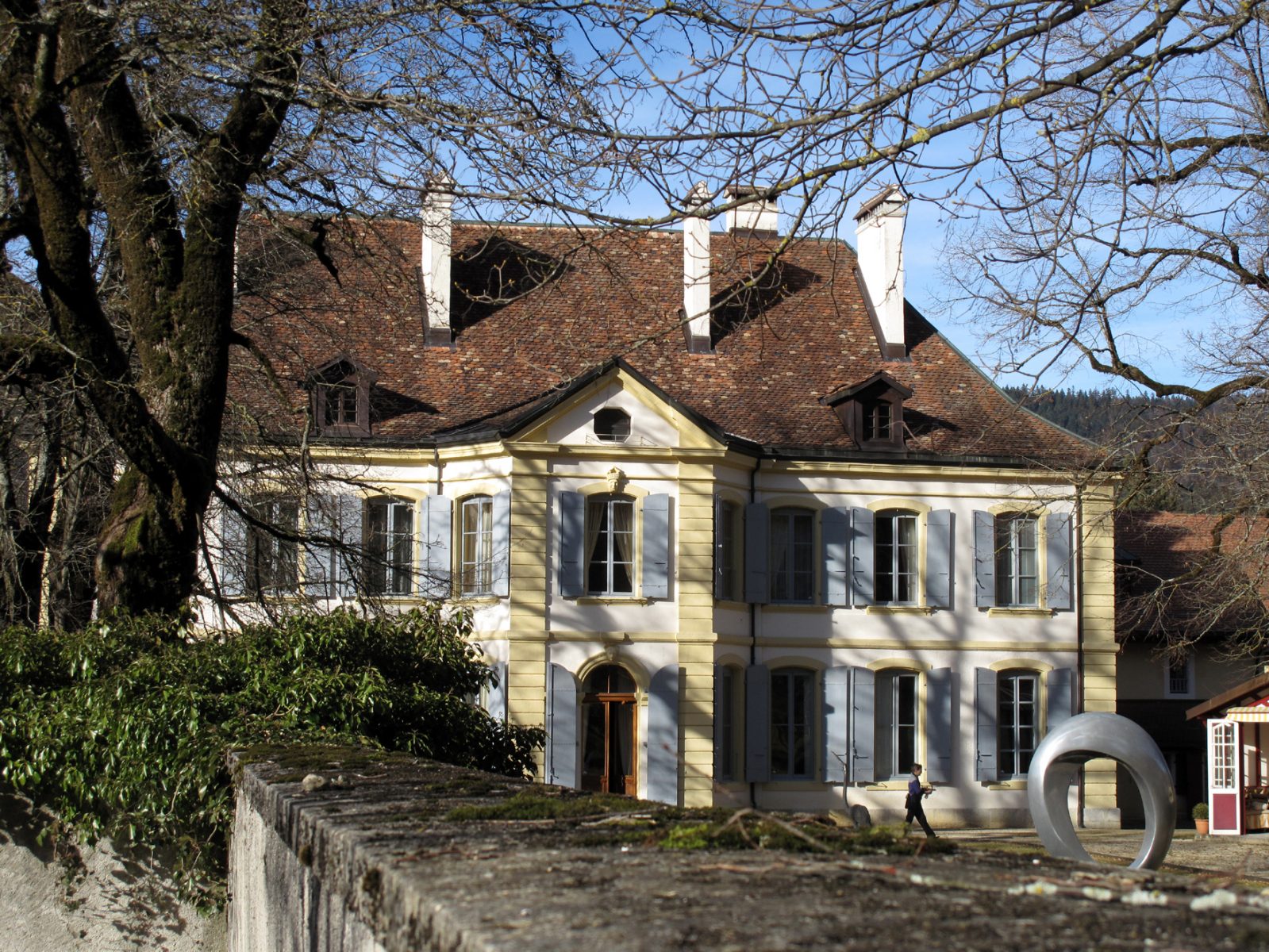
Château d'Ivernois

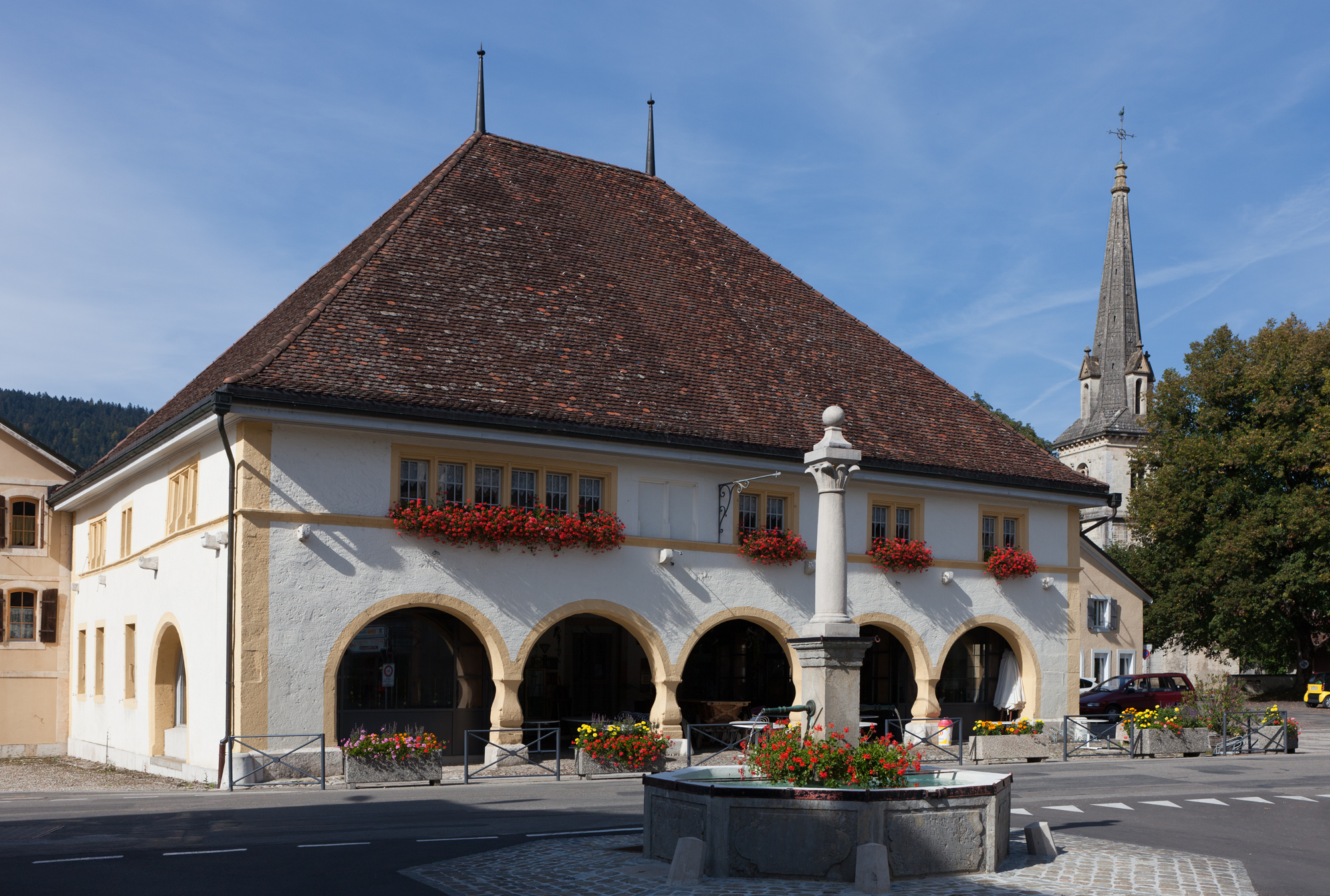
Motiers-Hotel-Six-Communes, previously a midway station

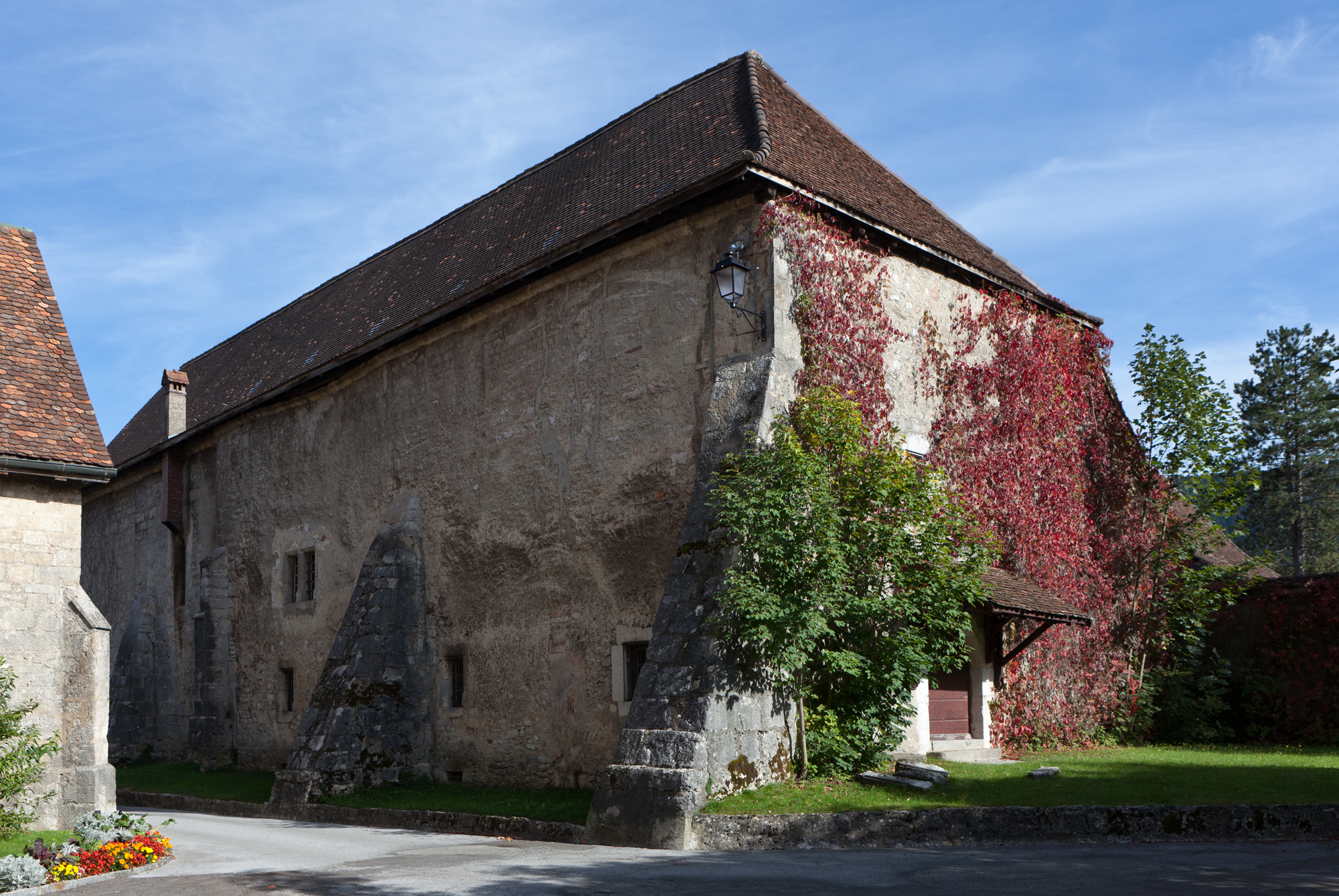
Medieval church of St-Pierre

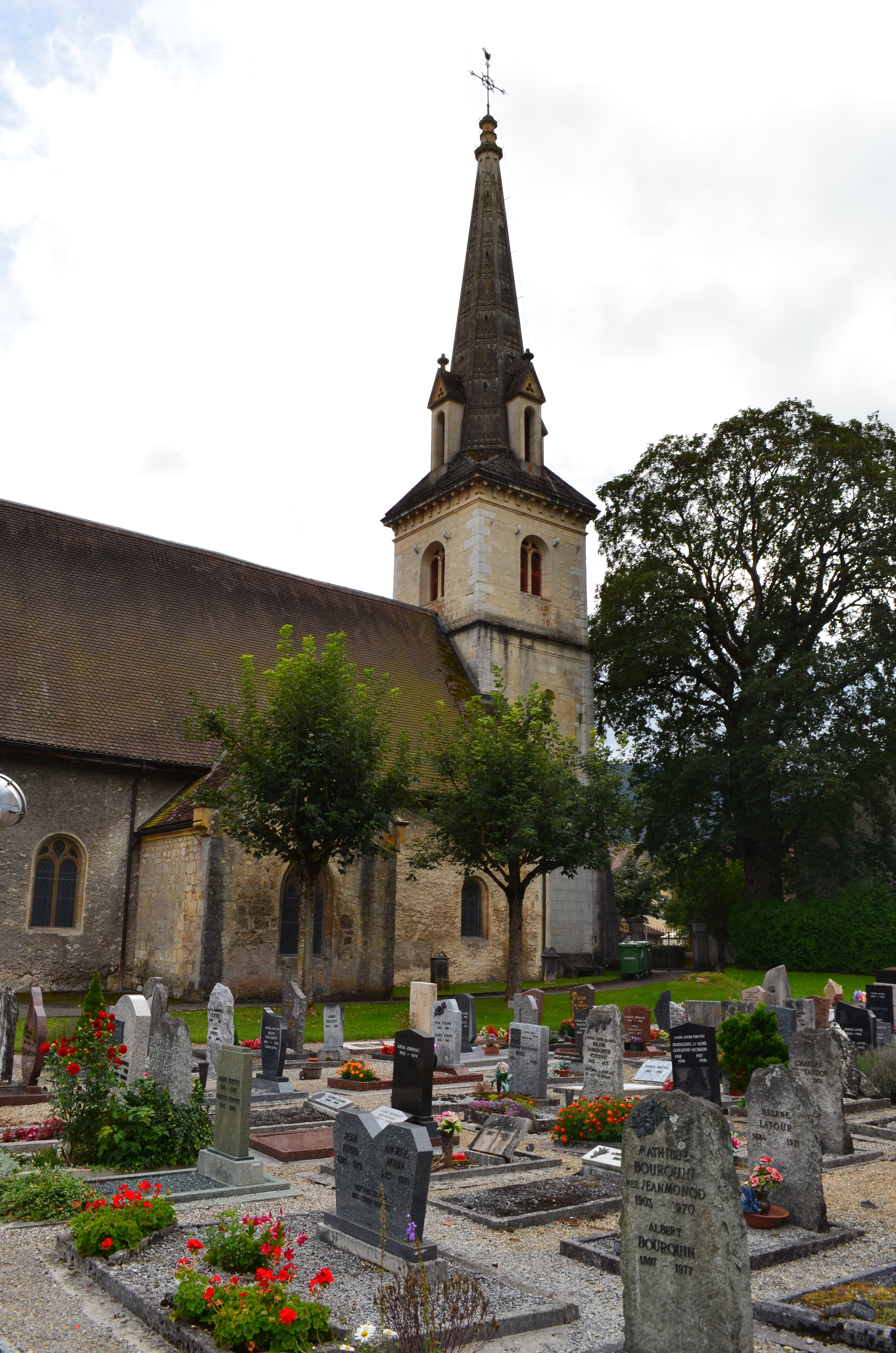
Temple of Môtiers

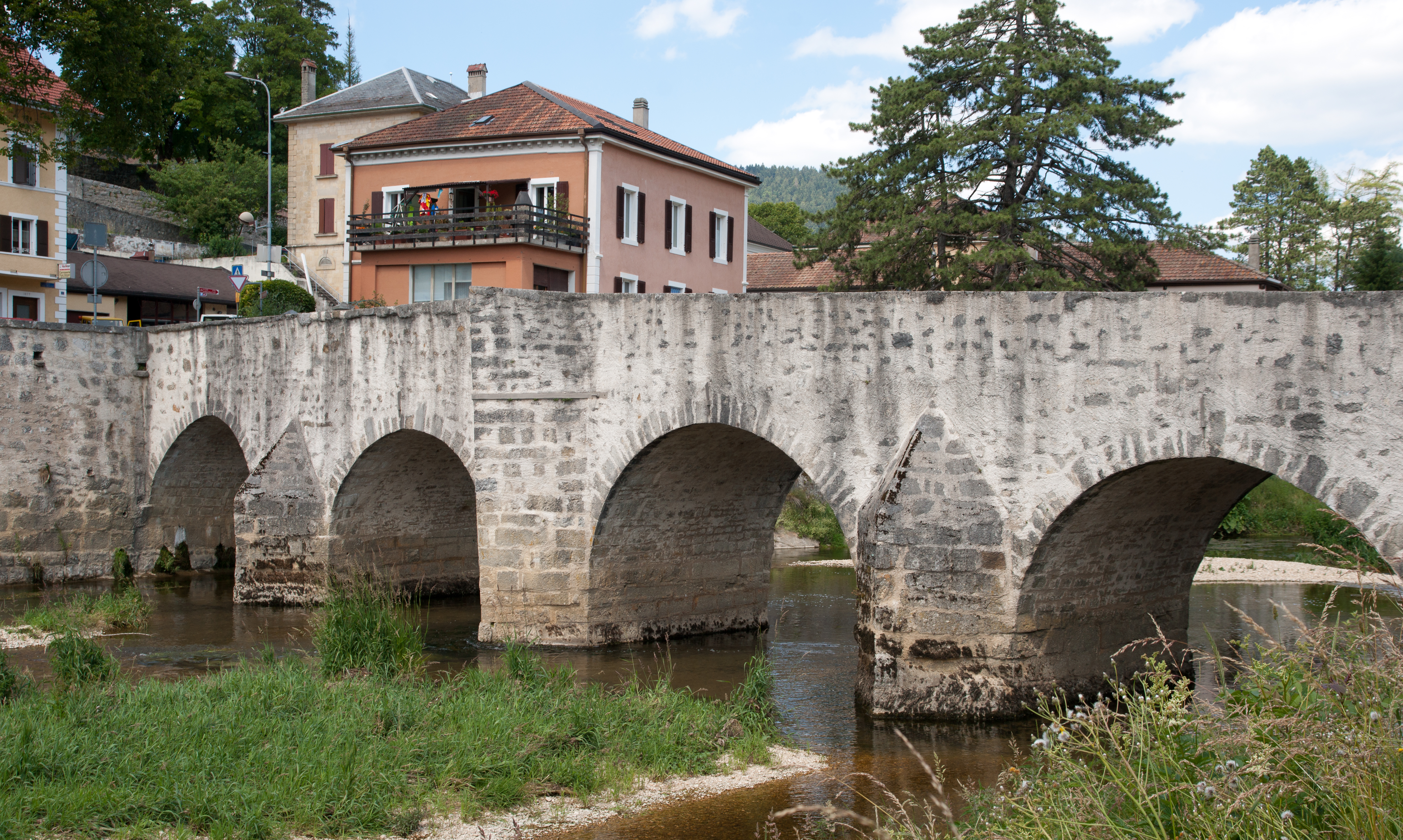
Areuse Bridge

== Economy ==
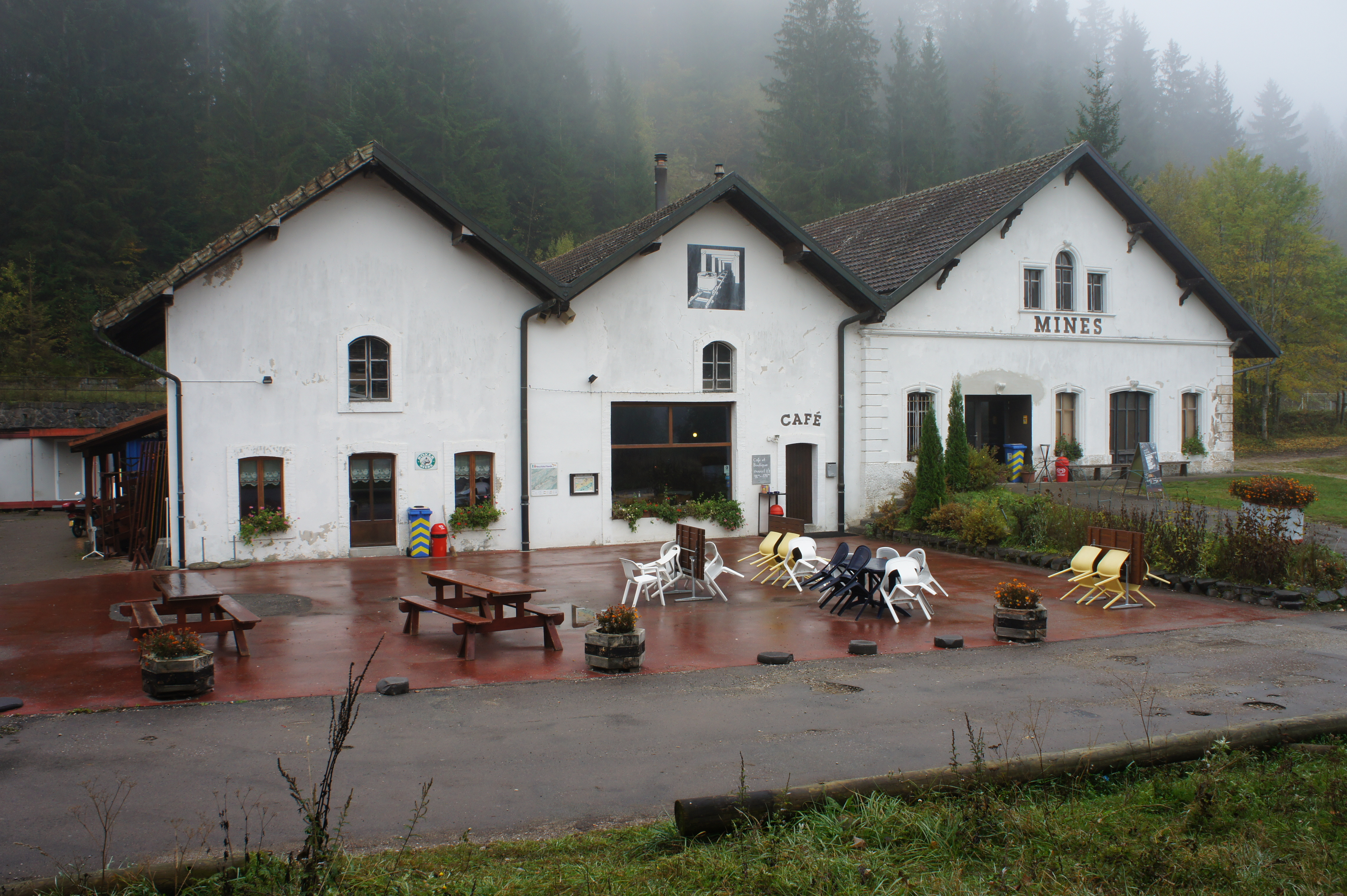
La Presta Asphalt Mine

As of 2010, Val-de-Travers had an unemployment rate of 6.6%. As of 2008, there were 322 people employed in the primary economic sector and about 139 businesses involved in this sector. 1,980 people were employed in the secondary sector and there were 162 businesses in this sector. 2,188 people were employed in the tertiary sector, with 374 businesses in this sector. There were residents of the municipality who were employed in some capacity. Of the working population, 13.1% used public transportation to get to work, and 57.3% used a private car.

Asphalt was exploited until 1986 at La Presta Asphalt Mine. It is nowadays a museum.

== Education ==
In the canton of Neuchâtel most municipalities provide two years of non-mandatory kindergarten, followed by five years of mandatory primary education. The next four years of mandatory secondary education is provided at thirteen larger secondary schools, which many students travel out of their home municipality to attend. During the 2010–11 school year, there were 10.5 kindergarten classes with a total of 198 students in Val-de-Travers. In the same year, there were 29 primary classes with a total of 528 students.

== Transportation ==
The municipality has seven railway stations. Two, Travers and Noiraigue, are located on the Neuchâtel–Pontarlier line with service to Neuchâtel and France. The other five are located on the Travers–Buttes line, which also serves Travers.

== Notable people ==
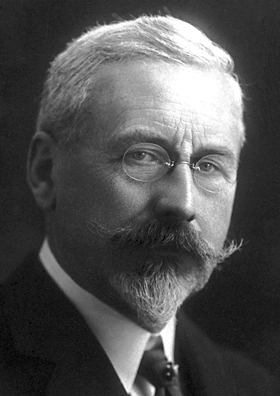
Charles Édouard Guillaume, 1920

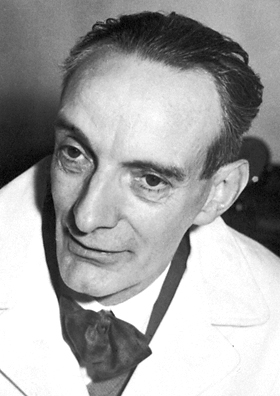
Daniel Bovet

- Emer de Vattel (1714 in Couvet – 1767) an international lawyer
- Ferdinand Berthoud (1727 in Plancemont-sur-Couvet – 1807) a scientist and watchmaker
- Jonas de Gélieu (1740 in Les Bayards – 1827) a Swiss pastor and beekeeper
- Salomé de Gélieu (1742 in Les Bayards – 1820) a Swiss educator and governess to several members of princely courts in Europe
- Léo Lesquereux (1806 in Fleurier – 1889) a Swiss bryologist and a pioneer of American paleobotany
- Édouard Piaget (1817 in Les Bayards – 1910) a Swiss entomologist who specialised in lice
- Charles Édouard Guillaume (1861 in Fleurier – 1938) a Swiss physicist who received the Nobel Prize in Physics in 1920
- Édouard Bovet (1797 in Fleurier – 1849) a Swiss watchmaker and founder of the Bovet Fleurier watch company
- Denis de Rougemont (1906 in Couvet – 1985) a Swiss writer and cultural theorist
- Daniel Bovet (1907 in Fleurier – 1992) a Swiss-born Italian pharmacologist who won the 1957 Nobel Prize in Physiology or Medicine for his discovery of drugs that block the actions of specific neurotransmitters
- Fritz Tschannen (1920 – 2011 in Val-de-Travers) a Swiss accordion player, former ski jumper who competed at the 1948 Winter Olympics and a conductor until 1999, when he retired to Fleurier
