= Salomé de Gélieu =

Salomé de Gélieu (17 April 1742, Les Bayards - 29 March 1820, Colombier) was a Swiss educator and governess to several members of princely courts in Europe.

== Life ==
Salomé was the daughter of the preacher Jacques de Gélieu and his wife Elizabeth, née Willy. She grew up with five siblings in Les Verrières. After the death of her father in 1763, she and her sisters Rose and Marie-Elisabeth opened a boarding school for young girls in Neuchâtel in 1765. Between 1768 and 1777 she worked as a teacher in England, where her pupils included the daughter of George Spencer, 4th Duke of Marlborough.

Following her return to Neuchâtel in 1777, she and her sister Esther de Gélieu founded a boarding school in Neuchâtel until in 1785 she was summoned to Darmstadt to be governess to princesses Therese, Frederica and Louise of Mecklenburg-Strelitz. At the same time she acted as tutor to the brothers George and Charles of Mecklenburg-Strelitz. She served in this role until 1793 at the court of Princess George and returned to Neuchâtel to serve princesses Frederica and Louise and prince Louis Charles, staying in her brother Jonas de Gélieu's vicarage in Colombier until her death in 1820. During her time as governess to Louise and Friederike, in 1787 she attended the Textilfabrik Cromford in Ratingen founded by Johann Gottfried Brügelmann - her report of the visit was an important source for reconstructing the Textilfabrik Cromford's machines at the LVR Industrial Museum.

She corresponded with her pupils until her death. She was visited by Frederick William III of Prussia and his son William in 1814 and also by crown prince Frederick William.

In biographical literature on Queen Louise of Prussia, de Gélieu is often confused with her sister Susanne Salomé (1737-1808) - the latter only ever left the region of Neuchâtel to buy a house at Lignières belonging to the former prince-bishopric of Basel and frequent visits to neighbouring La Neuveville.

== Bibliography ==
- Claudia von Gélieu, Christian von Gélieu: Die Erzieherin von Königin Luise. Salomé de Gélieu. Pustet, Regensburg 2007, ISBN 978-3-7917-2043-2.
- Carsten Peter Thiede, Eckhard G. Franz: Jahre mit Luise von Mecklenburg-Strelitz. Aus Aufzeichnungen und Briefen der Salomé von Gélieu (1742–1822). In: Archiv für hessische Geschichte und Altertumskunde NF 43, 1985, ISSN 0066-636X, S. 79–160.
