= Édouard Piaget =

Swiss entomologist (1817–1910)

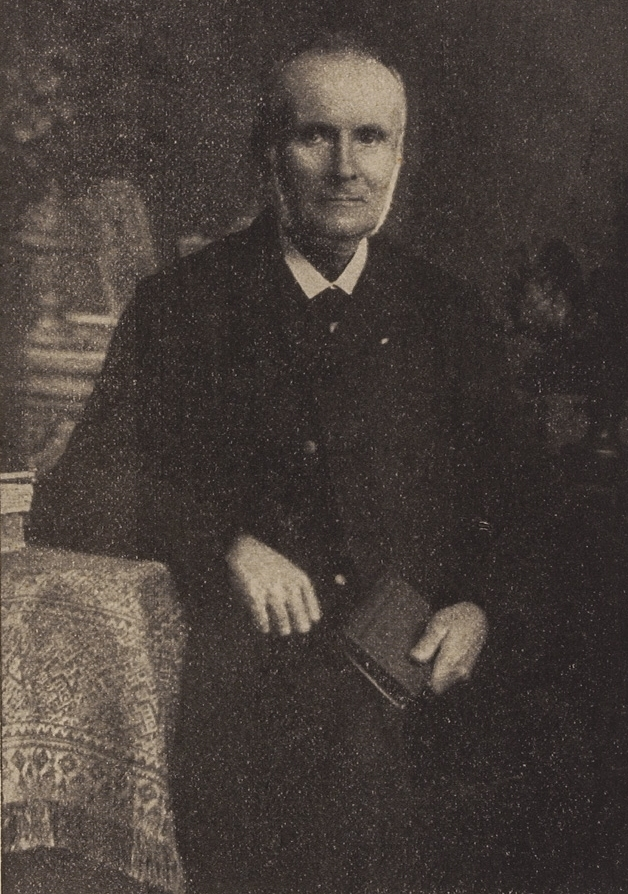
Piaget

Édouard Piaget (3 November 1817 in Les Bayards – 10 September 1910 in Couvet) was a Swiss entomologist who specialised in lice (Phthiraptera).

== Life ==
As a young man, Piaget became a teacher of French at Mr. de Raedt's Instituut Noorthey, an upper class boarding school in the Netherlands. After obtaining a doctorate in Roman Law at Leiden University he remained in the Netherlands but did not practice law as a profession, working instead as a private tutor until 1844, when he was appointed teacher of French and History at the Gymnasium Erasmianum in Rotterdam. Later he taught at the Hogere burgerschool for secondary education in Rotterdam. In 1884, aged 67, he returned to Les Bayards to live with his sister.

== Collection ==
Piaget's collection of lice (Pédiculines) was obtained from animals in the Zoological Gardens at Rotterdam and from skins in the Naturalis in Leiden. It was enhanced by specimens from all over the world sent for identification and description.

His entomological collection, herbarium, and library were given to the Musée d'Histoire Naturelle in Neuchâtel. Part of his collection is now in the Natural History Museum in London, with his general entomological collection still at the Muséum d'Histoire Naturelle in Neuchâtel.

== Works ==
Monographs

- (1880) Les pédiculines: Essay monographique. Leiden, Brill, E. J., 714 pp. pdf
- (1885) Les Pediculines. Essai monographique. Supplement. E. J. Brill, xii+200pp.
