= Ivernois Castle =

Historic building in Switzerland

Coordinates: 46°54′38″N 6°36′43″E

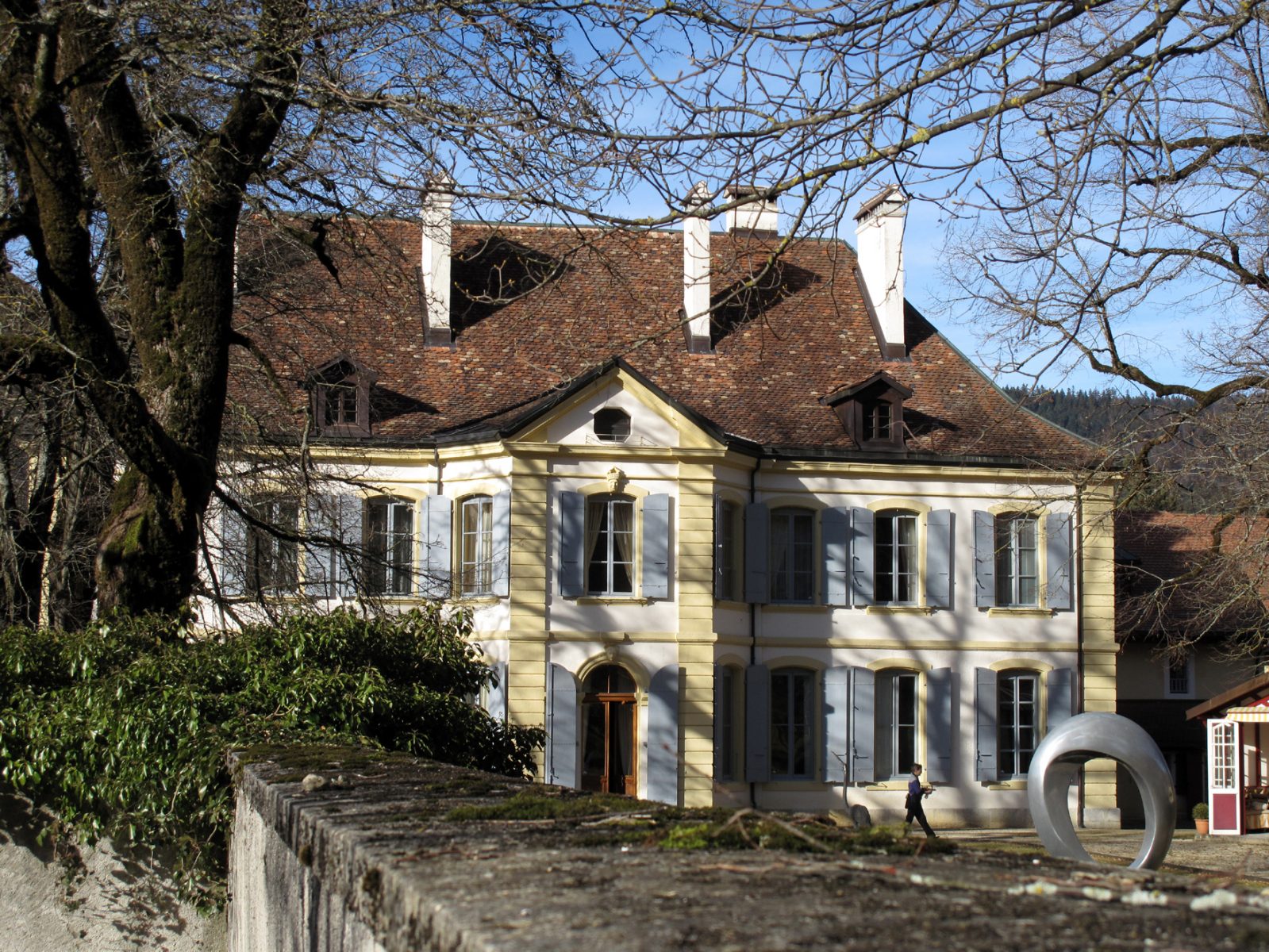
Château d'Ivernois

Ivernois Castle, or Château d'Ivernois, is an historic château in the village of Môtiers, in the municipality of Val-de-Travers, Canton of Neuchâtel, in Switzerland.

== Heritage listing ==
Château d'Ivernois is a Swiss heritage site of national significance, located in Môtiers, Val-de-Travers, Neuchâtel canton.

The complex dates back to the early 18th century.

== Museums ==
At least part of the buildings that were once part of the landowner's property, at Grande Rue 7, Môtiers, are now owned by the Burkhardt-Felder Foundation. The foundation was established by Gerard and Theresa Burkhardt-Felder in 2002, who had lived in Australia for 25 years, where they developed an interest in both Aboriginal Australian art and motor cars. Gerard Burkhardt-Felder was a merchant banker, and at one time chairman of Mount Edon Gold Mines in Western Australia. Between 2003 and 2006, they converted a former agricultural building (built in 1721) and riding hall (built in 1856) into two museums: one dedicated to Aboriginal Australian art, called La Grange, and the other to motor cars, called Le Manège.

La Grange, the Aboriginal art museum, is a large exhibition space that has hosted a series of exhibitions showcasing the work of world-famous Aboriginal artists. It also houses a permanent collection, which includes both traditional and contemporary Aboriginal Australian art, from bark paintings and ceremonial objects to modern painting on canvas. La Grange opened in 2008, opened with an exhibition of 53 works, including boomerangs, Tiwi sculptures, and a large work by a group of artists from Wangkatungka.

Le Manège houses a permanent exhibition of cars, ranging in date of manufacture from 1897 to 1980. Of the 23 cars in the museum in 2009, 14 had been purchased in Australia.

== See also ==
- List of castles in Switzerland
