= Edouard Dubied & Co =

Coordinates: 46°55′37″N 6°38′22″E

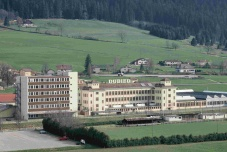
Edouard Dubied & Co at Couvet

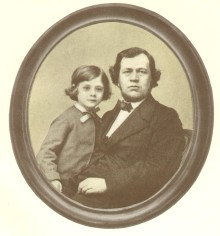
Henri-Édouard Dubied and his son Paul-Édouard

Edouard Dubied & Cie S.A. (French: Edouard Dubied & Co) was a Swiss enterprise producing machines for the textile industry. It was formed in 1867, went into administration in 1987 and was wound up in 1988. It was based in Neuchâtel and then in Couvet.

== History ==
Henri-Edouard Dubied was born in Couvet as the son of an absinthe distiller. He founded the business after attending the Exposition Universelle (1867), where he bought the rights to make hand-cranked knitting machines from Isaac W. Lamb. These knitting machines were originally designed for making socks and hosiery, and used a recently invented kind of mechanical needle.

His son, Paul-Edouard Dubied, who had trained as an engineer at the École polytechnique fédérale de Zurich (French: Zurich federal polytechnic college), succeeded him in 1878. He added motors to the knitting machines and created a department of general mechanics specialising in lathes. He focused on this new field, and in time expanded to Pontarlier in France, and handed over the knitting machine business to his son Pierre-Edouard.

Pierre-Edouard Dubied developed not only the two departments of the business, but also its social side: infirmary, dining hall, family support, health insurance, property and so on. He created the Neuchâtel factory and a new department of machine tools. In 1935 he bought the Chemnitzer Strickmaschinen-Fabrik AG (German: Chemnitz knitting machine factory), a German corporation that produced circular knitting machines. These gave rise to the Wevenit family of knitting machines that later became famous.

Pierre Dubied had two sons and a daughter, and outlived all of them. His daughter Pierrette married Rodo de Salis, by whom she had a son, Sker de Salis. Sker joined the board of directors and was named Managing Director in 1973. By this date, both kinds of knitting machine (circular and rectilinear) were electrically operated.

In 1967 the business celebrated its centenary. Twenty years later, it went into administration. The corporation was wound up in 1988.

== Notes and references ==
- couvet.ch (ed.). "Rue Pierre Dubied".

== Archive sources ==
- DUBIED, Fonds: Entreprise Dubied (1867 - 1995). Archives de l'État de Neuchâtel.
