= Jonas de Gélieu =

Swiss pastor and beekeeper (1740–1827)

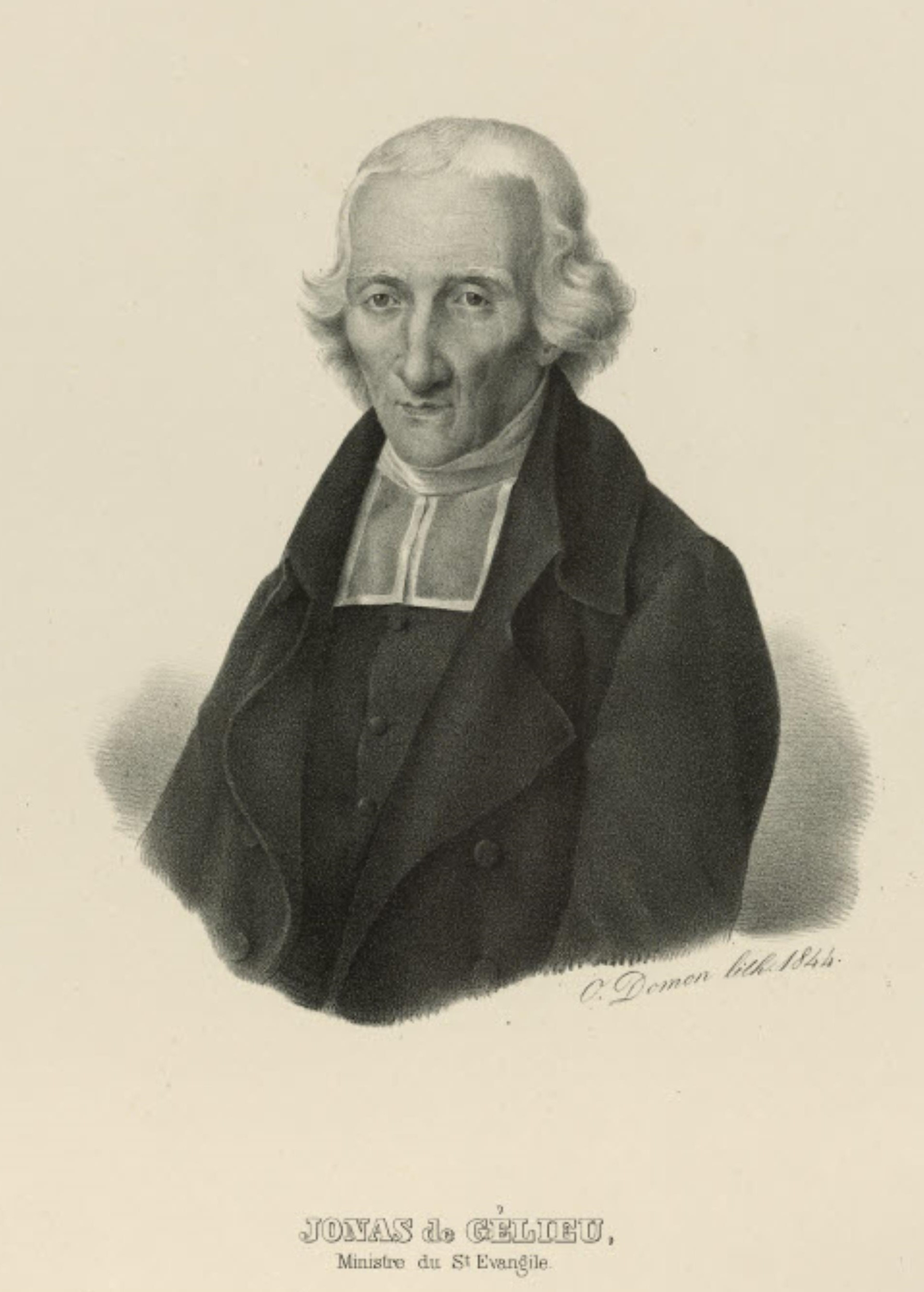
Jonas de Gélieu in 1814

Jonas de Gélieu (21 August 1740 – 17 October 1827) was a Swiss pastor and beekeeper, notable for his contact with Jean Jacques Rousseau and Isabelle de Charrière.

== Biography ==
Gélieu was born on 21 August 1740 in Les Bayards, in the Principality of Neuchâtel (now the Swiss canton of Neuchâtel), the son of Elisabeth Willy and Jacques de Gélieu, a pastor and beekeper. His paternal family, ennobled by Prince Frederick William in 1736, was of French Huguenot origin from Issigeac. Gélieu was ordained in 1760 and was first appointed substitute pastor at Corcelles. Between 1763 and 1790, he served as deacon at Môtiers and La Chaux-de-Fonds and as pastor of Lignières. Gélieu became the pastor of Colombier in 1790, a post he held until his death.

An avid beekeeper, Gélieu shared many of his personal experiences with the Economic Society of Bern, of which he was a member. In 1816, he published Le conservateur des abeilles, a short treatise on beekeeping preceded by an autobiographical section, a work that earned him the nickname of "Father of Bees" (Père des abeilles). Gélieu also published articles on comets, the ascent of sap, and several reactionary political pamphlets from 1792 to 1794, and was member of the Swiss Society of Natural Sciences. Gélieu died on 17 October 1827 in Colombier, aged 87.

== Archive Sources ==
- PAST, Fonds: Archives de la société des pasteurs et ministres neuchâtelois (13e-20e). Archives de l'État de Neuchâtel.
