= Môtiers =

- Former municipality
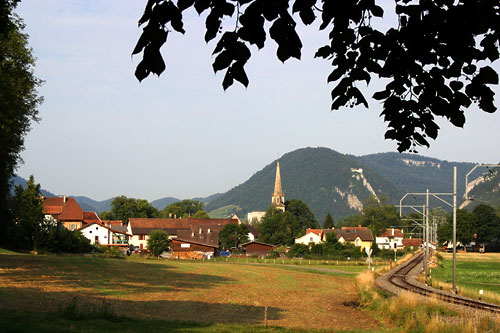

- Flag Coat of arms
- Location of Môtiers
- Location within Switzerland Location within Canton of Neuchâtel
- Coordinates: 46°55′N 6°37′E
- Country: Switzerland
- Canton: Neuchâtel
- District: Val-de-Travers

Area
  - Total: 6.42 km^{2} (2.48 sq mi)
- Elevation: 737 m (2,418 ft)

Population (December 2007)
  - Total: 825
  - Density: 129/km^{2} (333/sq mi)
- Time zone: UTC+01:00 (CET)
  - Summer (DST): UTC+02:00 (CEST)
- Postal code: 2112
- SFOS number: 6507
- ISO 3166 code: CH-NE
- Surrounded by: Couvet, Boveresse, Fleurier
- Website: motiers.ne.ch

Môtiers is a village near Neuchâtel, Switzerland. It was also a municipality in the district of Val-de-Travers in the canton of Neuchâtel in Switzerland. On 1 January 2009, the former municipalities of Boveresse, Buttes, Couvet, Fleurier, Les Bayards, Môtiers, Noiraigue, Saint-Sulpice and Travers merged to form the municipality of Val-de-Travers. The village is considered the capital of Val-de-Travers.

== Description ==
The village has a population of around 800 people, but a 2012 article in SWI swissinfo described it as "one of the busiest places in Switzerland".

== Landmarks and attractions ==
Aerial view (1950)

=== Absinthe and wine production ===
The village is often associated with absinthe ("the green fairy"), since a nearly 100-year ban on the liquor was lifted when the French Senate voted to repeal the prohibition in April 2011. Môtiers then became the focal point of production and promotion of the liquor. The national Maison de l'Absinthe (Absinthe Museum) is located in the former courthouse, where absinthe distillers were formerly proscecuted.

Sparkling wine is produced in the cellars of the former Benedictine monastery of St. Pierre in Môtiers.

=== Museums ===
The Regional Museum of Val-de-Travers, called Maison des Mascarons, is located in Môtiers. It is housed in a large mansion that was rebuilt in the mid-1700s, and its name is derived from the sculpted masks (mascarons) on the keystones on its window arches.

The Château d'Ivernois is an historic building complex dating back to the early 18th century, now owned by the Burkhardt-Felder Foundation. The foundation was established by Gerard and Theresa Burkhardt-Felder in 2002, who had lived in Australia for 25 years, where they developed an interest in both Aboriginal Australian art and motor cars. Gerard Burkhardt-Felder was a merchant banker, and at one time chairman of Mount Edon Gold Mines in Western Australia. Between 2003 and 2006, they converted a former agricultural building (built in 1721) and riding hall (built in 1856) into two museums: one dedicated to Aboriginal Australian art, called La Grange, and the other to motor cars, called Le Manège.

La Grange, the Aboriginal art museum, is a large exhibition space that has hosted a series of exhibitions showcasing the work of world-famous Aboriginal artists. It also houses a permanent collection, which includes both traditional and contemporary Aboriginal Australian art, from bark paintings and ceremonial objects to modern painting on canvas. La Grange opened in 2008, opened with an exhibition of 53 works, including boomerangs, Tiwi sculptures, and a large work by a group of artists from Wangkatungka.

Le Manège houses a permanent exhibition of cars, ranging in date of manufacture from 1897 to 1980. Of the 23 cars in the museum in 2009, 14 had been purchased in Australia.

=== Other attractions ===
There are caves and a waterfall nearby to explore.

== People ==
Jean-Jacques Rousseau sought and found protection in Môtiers from 1762 under George Keith, who was the local representative of the free-thinking Frederick the Great of Prussia. While living in Môtiers, Rousseau was visited by James Boswell (December 1764) and drafted a Constitution for Corsica (Projet de Constitution pour la Corse, 1765). After his house was stoned on the night of 6 September 1765, Rousseau left to seek refuge, first on St. Peter's Island, and then in Great Britain with David Hume.

Louis Agassiz was born in Môtiers in 1807.
