= Les Verrières =

- Municipality
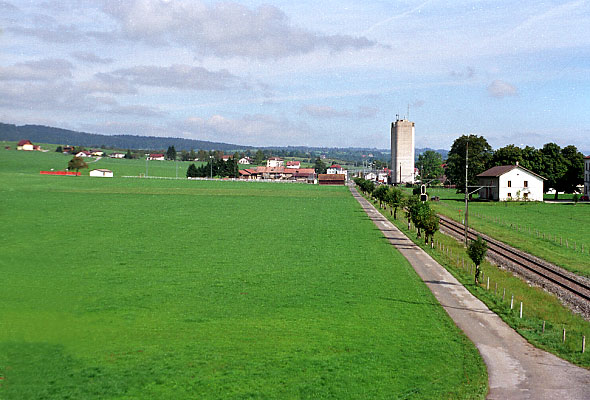
- Les Verrières village

- Coat of arms
- Location of Les Verrières
- Location within Switzerland Location within Canton of Neuchâtel
- Coordinates: 46°54′N 6°29′E
- Country: Switzerland
- Canton: Neuchâtel

Area
  - Total: 28.68 km^{2} (11.07 sq mi)
- Elevation: 930 m (3,050 ft)

Population (December 2007)
  - Total: 669
  - Density: 23.3/km^{2} (60.4/sq mi)
- Time zone: UTC+01:00 (CET)
  - Summer (DST): UTC+02:00 (CEST)
- Postal code: 2126
- SFOS number: 6511
- ISO 3166 code: CH-NE
- Surrounded by: Buttes, La Côte-aux-Fées, Les Alliés (FR-25), Les Bayards, Pontarlier (FR-25), Verrières-de-Joux (FR-25)
- Website: lesverrieres.ch

Les Verrières (French pronunciation: [le vɛʁjɛʁ]) is a municipality in the canton of Neuchâtel in Switzerland.

== History ==
Les Verrières is first mentioned in 1344 as villa de Verreriis. Jt was here that General Charles-Denis Bourbaki crossed the Swiss border with the remnants of the Armée de l'Est during the Franco-Prussian War (1870–71).

== Geography ==
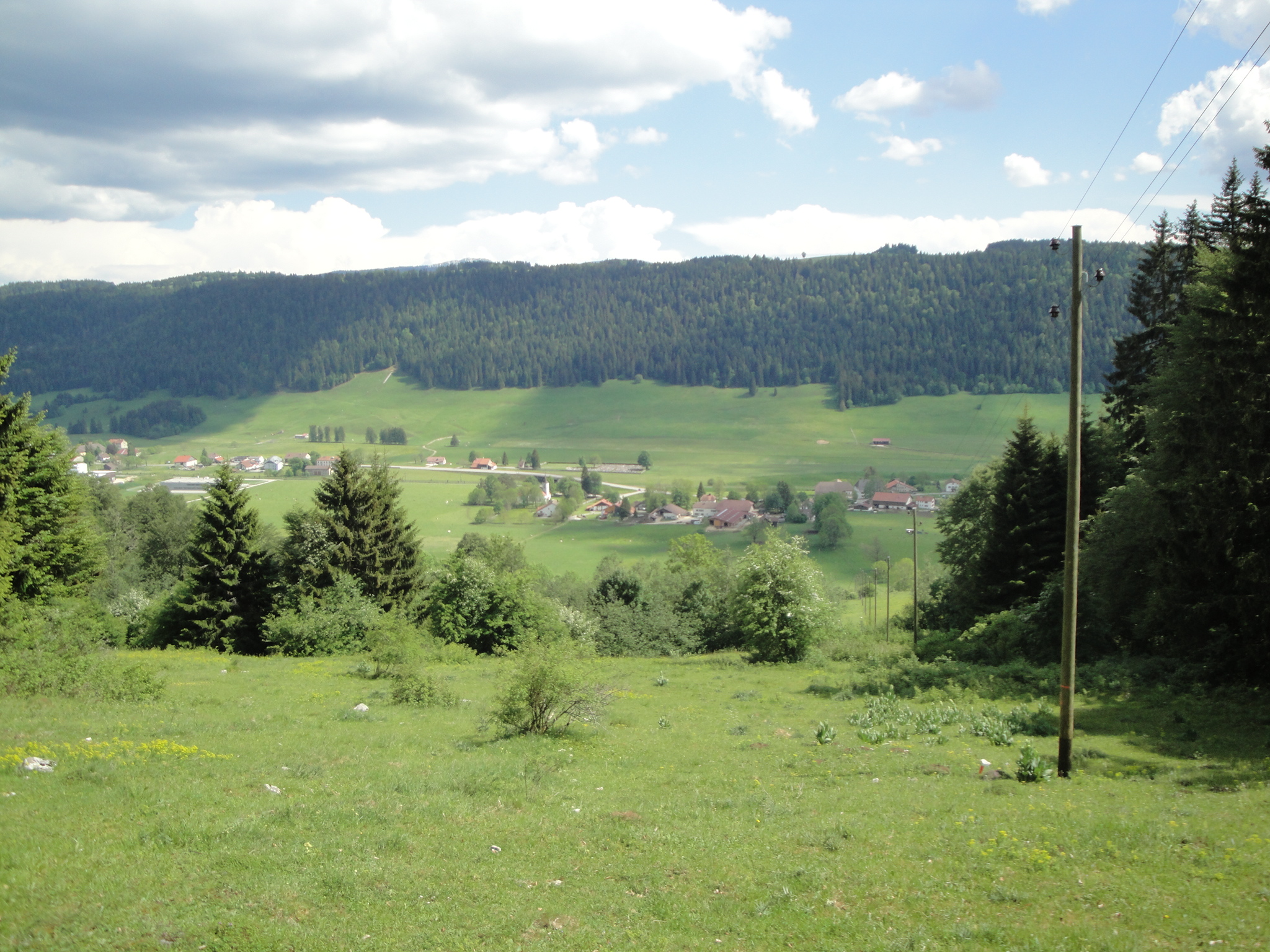
A village in Les Verrières

Les Verrières has an area, as of 2009, of 28.7 square kilometers (11.1 mi^{2}). Of this area, 13.18 km^{2} (5.09 mi^{2}) or 46.0% is used for agricultural purposes, while 14.53 km^{2} (5.61 mi^{2}) or 50.7% is forested. Of the rest of the land, 0.95 km^{2} (0.37 mi^{2}) or 3.3% is settled (buildings or roads) and 0.12 km^{2} (30 acres) or 0.4% is unproductive land.

Of the built up area, housing and buildings made up 1.3% and transportation infrastructure made up 1.6%. Out of the forested land, 46.4% of the total land area is heavily forested and 4.2% is covered with orchards or small clusters of trees. Of the agricultural land, 1.2% is used for growing crops and 22.8% is pastures and 22.0% is used for alpine pastures.

The municipality was located in the district of Val-de-Travers, until the district level was eliminated on 1 January 2018.

The main settlement is a linear village that is about 3 km (1.9 mi) long and consists of the villages of Cret, Belle Perche, Grand Bourgeau, Croix-Blanche and Meudon. Outside the main village, there are the hamlets of Cernets and Mont-des-Verrières and scattered settlements over an elevation of 910 to 1,286 m (2,986 to 4,219 ft) above sea level.

== Coat of arms ==
The blazon of the municipal coat of arms is Azure, on a bend Argent three Mullets [of Six] of the first.

== Demographics ==
Les Verrières has a population (as of December 2020) of 646. As of 2008, 5.1% of the population are resident foreign nationals. Over the last 10 years (2000–2010) the population has changed at a rate of -10.1%. Migration accounted for -7.2%, while births and deaths accounted for -1.9%.

Most of the population (as of 2000) speaks French (661 or 89.9%) as their first language, German is the second most common (32 or 4.4%) and English is the third (7 or 1.0%). There are 4 people who speak Italian and 3 people who speak Romansh.

As of 2008, the population was 50.1% male and 49.9% female. The population was made up of 307 Swiss men (46.0% of the population) and 27 (4.0%) non-Swiss men. There were 320 Swiss women (48.0%) and 13 (1.9%) non-Swiss women. Of the population in the municipality, 246 or about 33.5% were born in Les Verrières and lived there in 2000. There were 171 or 23.3% who were born in the same canton, while 137 or 18.6% were born somewhere else in Switzerland, and 87 or 11.8% were born outside of Switzerland.

As of 2000, children and teenagers (0–19 years old) make up 27.1% of the population, while adults (20–64 years old) make up 55% and seniors (over 64 years old) make up 18%.

As of 2000, there were 313 people who were single and never married in the municipality. There were 344 married individuals, 46 widows or widowers and 32 individuals who are divorced.

As of 2000, there were 294 private households in the municipality, and an average of 2.2 persons per household. There were 117 households that consist of only one person and 25 households with five or more people. In 2000, a total of 287 apartments (68.2% of the total) were permanently occupied, while 75 apartments (17.8%) were seasonally occupied and 59 apartments (14.0%) were empty. The vacancy rate for the municipality, in 2010, was 3.55%.

The historical population is given in the following chart:

== Sights ==
The entire village of Les Verrières is designated as part of the Inventory of Swiss Heritage Sites.

== Politics ==
In the 2007 federal election the most popular party was the SVP which received 42.27% of the vote. The next three most popular parties were the SP (19.72%), the FDP (18.69%) and the LPS Party (7.81%). In the federal election, a total of 265 votes were cast, and the voter turnout was 45.4%.

== Economy ==
As of 2010, Les Verrières had an unemployment rate of 4.4%. As of 2008, there were 56 people employed in the primary economic sector and about 23 businesses involved in this sector. 56 people were employed in the secondary sector and there were 6 businesses in this sector. 127 people were employed in the tertiary sector, with 32 businesses in this sector. There were 311 residents of the municipality who were employed in some capacity, of which females made up 42.1% of the workforce.

In 2008 the total number of full-time equivalent jobs was 201. The number of jobs in the primary sector was 50, of which 49 were in agriculture and 1 was in forestry or lumber production. The number of jobs in the secondary sector was 52 of which 35 or (67.3%) were in manufacturing and 17 (32.7%) were in construction. The number of jobs in the tertiary sector was 99. In the tertiary sector; 24 or 24.2% were in wholesale or retail sales or the repair of motor vehicles, 8 or 8.1% were in the movement and storage of goods, 18 or 18.2% were in a hotel or restaurant, 1 was the insurance or financial industry, 5 or 5.1% were technical professionals or scientists, 4 or 4.0% were in education and 8 or 8.1% were in health care.

In 2000, there were 109 workers who commuted into the municipality and 143 workers who commuted away. The municipality is a net exporter of workers, with about 1.3 workers leaving the municipality for every one entering. About 22.0% of the workforce coming into Les Verrières are coming from outside Switzerland. Of the working population, 9.3% used public transportation to get to work, and 51.1% used a private car.

== Religion ==
From the 2000 census, 192 or 26.1% were Roman Catholic, while 371 or 50.5% belonged to the Swiss Reformed Church. Of the rest of the population, there were 11 individuals (or about 1.50% of the population) who belonged to another Christian church. There were 5 individuals (or about 0.68% of the population) who were Jewish, and 4 (or about 0.54% of the population) who were Islamic. There were 2 individuals who belonged to another church. 63 (or about 8.57% of the population) belonged to no church, are agnostic or atheist, and 91 individuals (or about 12.38% of the population) did not answer the question.

== Education ==
In Les Verrières about 224 or (30.5%) of the population have completed non-mandatory upper secondary education, and 40 or (5.4%) have completed additional higher education (either university or a Fachhochschule). Of the 40 who completed tertiary schooling, 55.0% were Swiss men, 35.0% were Swiss women.

In the canton of Neuchâtel most municipalities provide two years of non-mandatory kindergarten, followed by five years of mandatory primary education. The next four years of mandatory secondary education is provided at thirteen larger secondary schools, which many students travel out of their home municipality to attend. During the 2010–11 school year, there was one kindergarten class with a total of 14 students in Les Verrières. In the same year, there were 2 primary classes with a total of 34 students.

As of 2000, there were 2 students in Les Verrières who came from another municipality, while 62 residents attended schools outside the municipality.
