= Buttes, Neuchâtel =

Buttes
- Former municipality
- Coat of arms
- Location of Buttes
- Location within Switzerland Location within Canton of Neuchâtel
- Coordinates: 46°53′N 6°33′E
- Country: Switzerland
- Canton: Neuchâtel
- District: Val-de-Travers

Area
  - Total: 18.20 km^{2} (7.03 sq mi)
- Elevation: 770 m (2,530 ft)

Population (December 2007)
  - Total: 601
  - Density: 33.0/km^{2} (85.5/sq mi)
- Time zone: UTC+01:00 (CET)
  - Summer (DST): UTC+02:00 (CEST)
- Postal code: 2115
- SFOS number: 6503
- ISO 3166 code: CH-NE
- Surrounded by: Fiez (VD), Fleurier, Fontaines-sur-Grandson (VD), La Côte-aux-Fées, Les Bayards, Les Verrières, Sainte-Croix (VD), Saint-Sulpice
- Website: buttes.ne.ch

Buttes was a municipality in the district of Val-de-Travers in the canton of Neuchâtel in Switzerland. On 1 January 2009, the former municipalities of Boveresse, Buttes, Couvet, Fleurier, Les Bayards, Môtiers, Noiraigue, Saint-Sulpice and Travers merged to form Val-de-Travers.

Aerial view (1950)
