= Fleurier =

- Former municipality
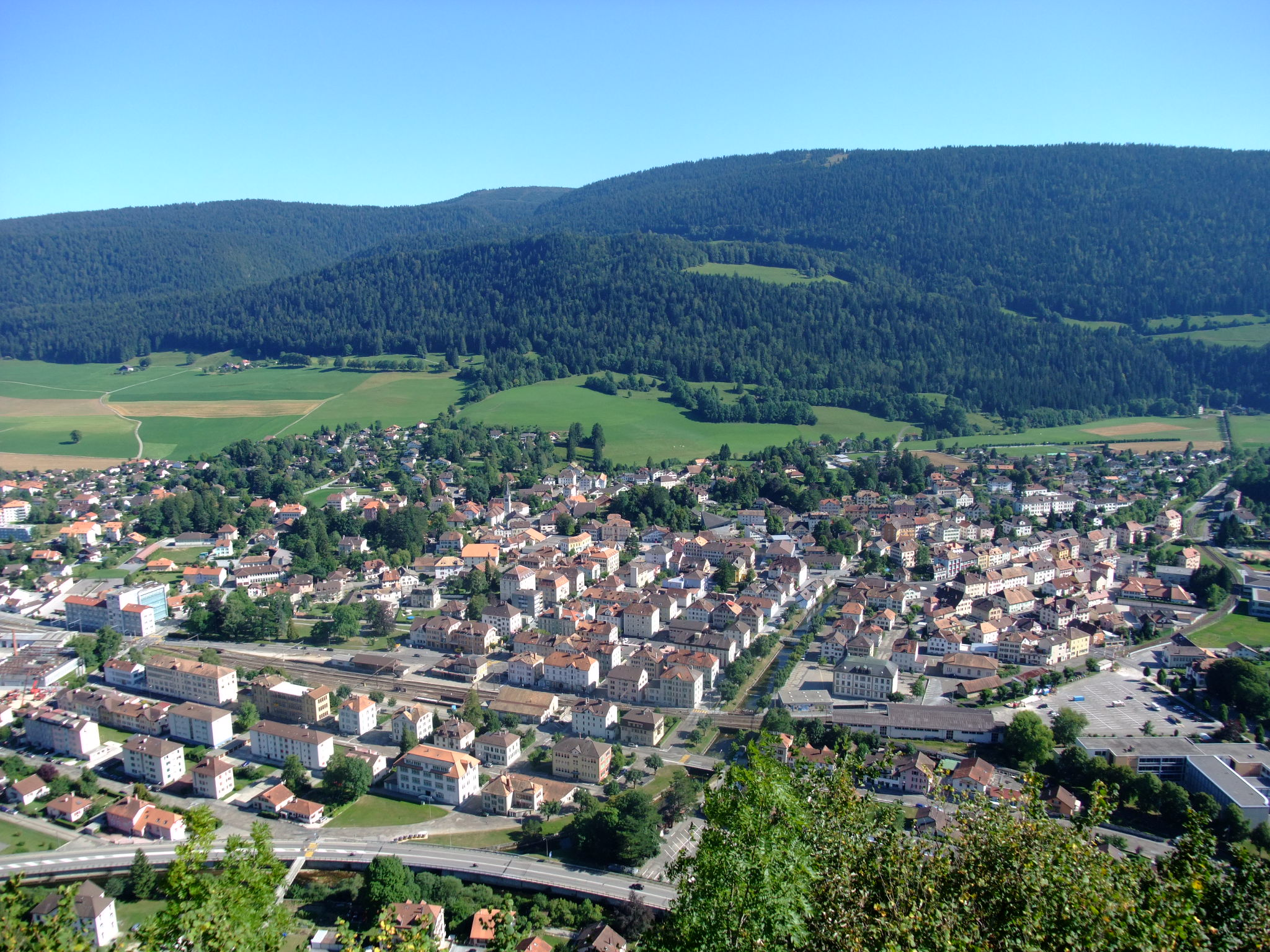

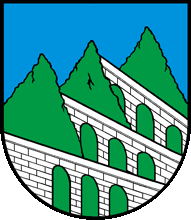
- Coat of arms
- Location of Fleurier
- Location within Switzerland Location within Canton of Neuchâtel
- Coordinates: 46°54′N 6°35′E
- Country: Switzerland
- Canton: Neuchâtel
- District: Val-de-Travers

Area
  - Total: 7.74 km^{2} (2.99 sq mi)
- Elevation: 741 m (2,431 ft)

Population (December 2007)
  - Total: 3,518
  - Density: 455/km^{2} (1,180/sq mi)
- Time zone: UTC+01:00 (CET)
  - Summer (DST): UTC+02:00 (CEST)
- Postal code: 2114
- SFOS number: 6506
- ISO 3166 code: CH-NE
- Surrounded by: Boveresse, Buttes, Fontaines-sur-Grandson (VD), Mauborget (VD), Môtiers, Romairon (VD), Saint-Sulpice
- Website: fleurier.ne.ch

Fleurier was a municipality in the district of Val-de-Travers in the canton of Neuchâtel in Switzerland. On 1 January 2009, the former municipalities of Boveresse, Buttes, Couvet, Fleurier, Les Bayards, Môtiers, Noiraigue, Saint-Sulpice and Travers merged to form the municipality of Val-de-Travers.

The Nobel laureates, physicist Charles Édouard Guillaume and pharmacologist Daniel Bovet, both originated from Fleurier.

Aerial view from 500 m by Walter Mittelholzer (1931)

== Watch manufacturing ==
Fleurier is also home to a few watch manufactures such as Parmigiani Fleurier and Bovet Fleurier. Vaucher Manufacture Fleurier, a company specialising in movements which are then purchased for use by other manufactures, is also based in this area. Also located nearby is the second facility for Chopard, which has its headquarters in Meyrin, Geneva. This facility works mainly on L.U.Chopard watches and works closely with the other manufactures of the area to ensure quality. Fleurier Ebauches SA, a subsidiary of the Chopard Group, is also located nearby. This will produce movements both for Chopard watches and other manufactures too. Foundation Qualité Fleurier is based in the town hall, it provides testing services for the watchmakers of Fleurier and regularly awards watches that meet its criteria. Chopard watches are the most commonly tested, although some complications are awarded the seal such as the L.U.Chopard Triple Certification Tourbillon. The first watch to have been awarded the COSC Chronometer rating, Geneva Seal as well as the QF (Qualité Fleurier) approval.

== Sports ==
In July 2017 Switzerland national bandy team in Fleurier played its first matches for over a century, namely ever since the 1913 European Bandy Championships in Davos. It was in the form of rink bandy. In September the team debuted in the international tournament in Nymburk, Czech Republic. Federation of International Bandy has decided to make the tournament official.

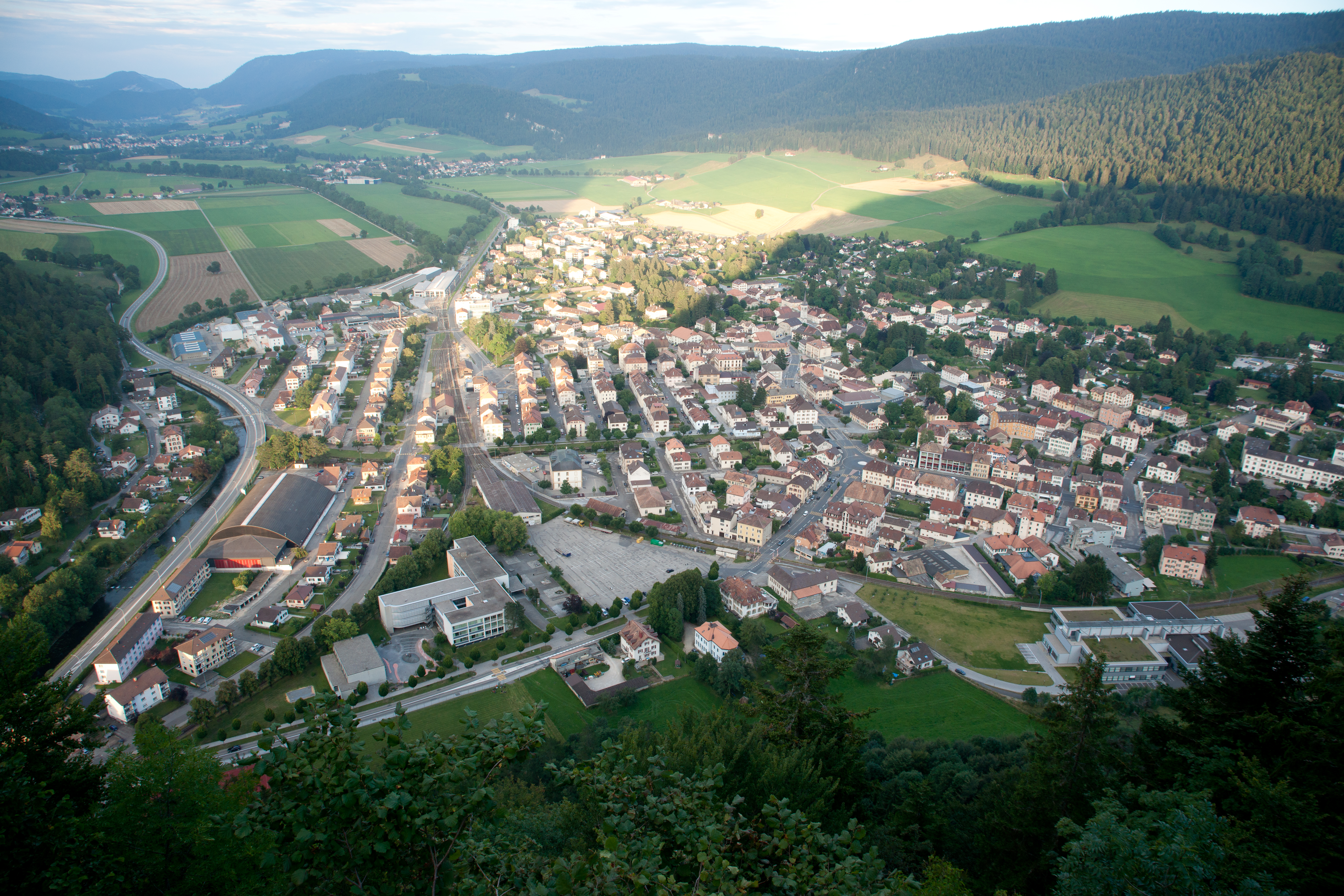
View of Fleurier from Chapeau de Napoléon
