= Saint-Sulpice, Neuchâtel =

Saint-Sulpice
- Former municipality
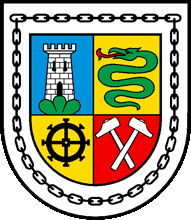
- Coat of arms
- Location of Saint-Sulpice
- Location within Switzerland Location within Canton of Neuchâtel
- Coordinates: 46°54′38″N 6°33′47″E
- Country: Switzerland
- Canton: Neuchâtel
- District: Val-de-Travers

Area
  - Total: 13.09 km^{2} (5.05 sq mi)
- Elevation: 754 m (2,474 ft)

Population (December 2007)
  - Total: 644
  - Density: 49.2/km^{2} (127/sq mi)
- Time zone: UTC+01:00 (CET)
  - Summer (DST): UTC+02:00 (CEST)
- Postal code: 2123
- SFOS number: 6509
- ISO 3166 code: CH-NE
- Surrounded by: Boveresse, Buttes, Fleurier, La Brévine, Les Bayards
- Website: SFSO statistics

Saint-Sulpice was a municipality in the district of Val-de-Travers in the canton of Neuchâtel in Switzerland. On 1 January 2009, the former municipalities of Boveresse, Buttes, Couvet, Fleurier, Les Bayards, Môtiers, Noiraigue, Saint-Sulpice and Travers merged to form Val-de-Travers.
