= Boveresse =

- Former municipality
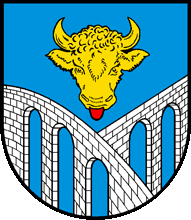
- Coat of arms
- Location of Boveresse
- Location within Switzerland Location within Canton of Neuchâtel
- Coordinates: 46°55′N 6°36′E
- Country: Switzerland
- Canton: Neuchâtel
- District: Val-de-Travers

Area
  - Total: 12.90 km^{2} (4.98 sq mi)
- Elevation: 735 m (2,411 ft)

Population (December 2007)
  - Total: 392
  - Density: 30.4/km^{2} (78.7/sq mi)
- Time zone: UTC+01:00 (CET)
  - Summer (DST): UTC+02:00 (CEST)
- Postal code: 2113
- SFOS number: 6502
- ISO 3166 code: CH-NE
- Surrounded by: Couvet, Fleurier, La Brévine, Môtiers, Saint-Sulpice
- Website: SFSO statistics

Boveresse was a municipality in the district of Val-de-Travers in the canton of Neuchâtel in Switzerland. On 1 January 2009, the former municipalities of Boveresse, Buttes, Couvet, Fleurier, Les Bayards, Môtiers, Noiraigue, Saint-Sulpice and Travers merged to form Val-de-Travers.
