= Noiraigue =

- Former municipality
- Coat of arms
- Location of Noiraigue
- Location within Switzerland Location within Canton of Neuchâtel
- Coordinates: 46°57′N 6°43′E
- Country: Switzerland
- Canton: Neuchâtel
- District: Val-de-Travers

Area
  - Total: 6.38 km^{2} (2.46 sq mi)
- Elevation: 729 m (2,392 ft)

Population (December 2007)
  - Total: 506
  - Density: 79.3/km^{2} (205/sq mi)
- Time zone: UTC+01:00 (CET)
  - Summer (DST): UTC+02:00 (CEST)
- Postal code: 2103
- SFOS number: 6508
- ISO 3166 code: CH-NE
- Surrounded by: Boudry, Brot-Dessous, Brot-Plamboz, Gorgier, Travers
- Website: SFSO statistics

Noiraigue or Noiraigue-Les Œillons was a municipality in the district of Val-de-Travers in the canton of Neuchâtel in Switzerland. On 1 January 2009, the former municipalities of Boveresse, Buttes, Couvet, Fleurier, Les Bayards, Môtiers, Noiraigue, Saint-Sulpice and Travers merged to form Val-de-Travers.

Aerial view (1964)

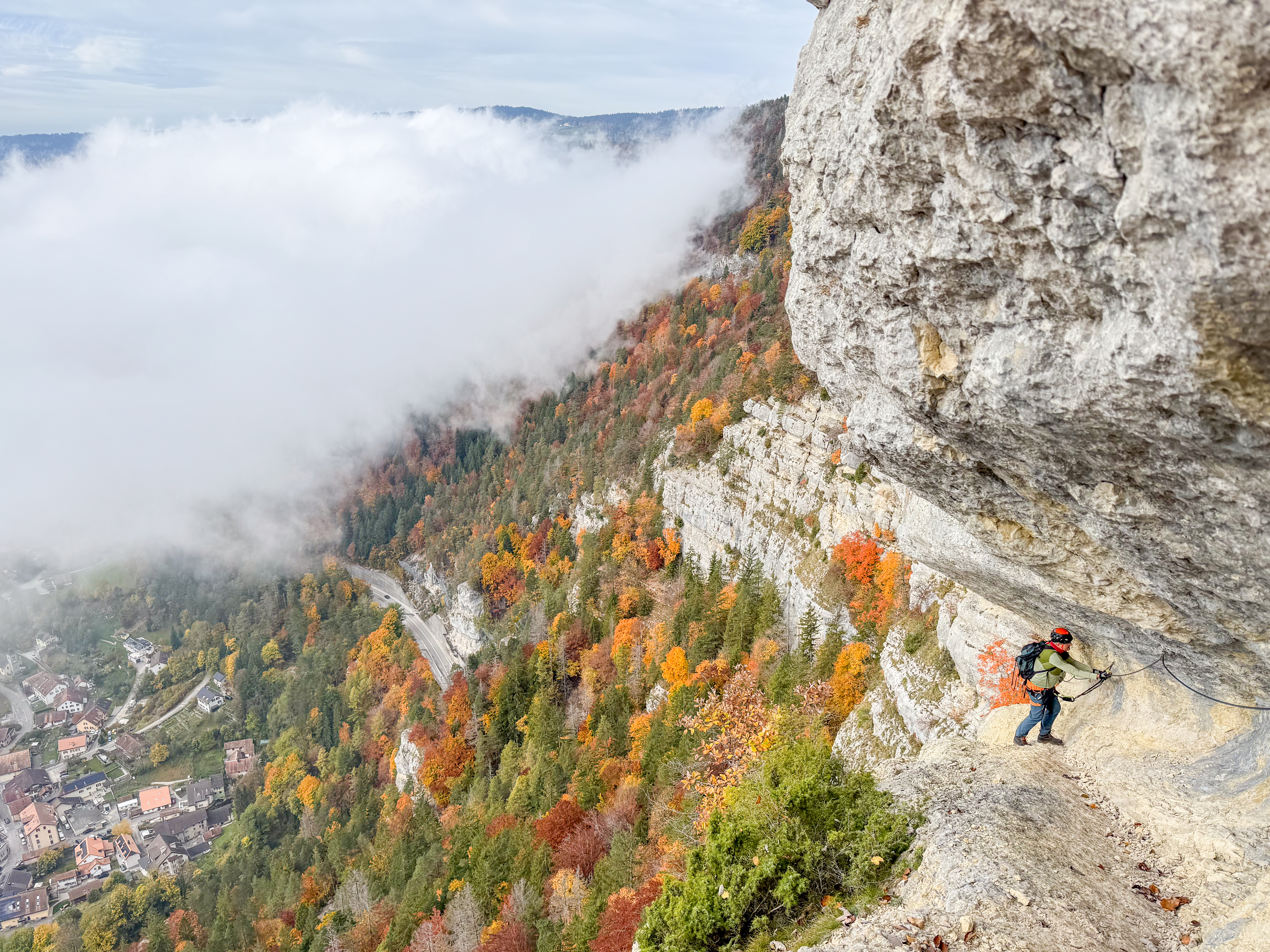
Via Ferrata du Tichodrome
