= Wangkatjungka Community =

Community in Western Australia

Wangkatjungka Western Australia
- Coordinates: 18°53′S 125°55′E
- Population: 228
- Postcode(s): 6765
- Location: 130 km (81 mi) south east of Fitzroy Crossing, Western Australia
- LGA(s): Shire of Derby–West Kimberley
- State electorate(s): Kimberley
- Federal division(s): Durack
Mean max temp	Mean min temp	Annual rainfall
35.6 °C; 96 °F	19.1 °C; 66 °F	541.2 mm 21.3 in

Wangkatjungka is a large Aboriginal community located 130 km south east of Fitzroy Crossing in the Kimberley region of Western Australia, within the Shire of Derby–West Kimberley.

== Native title ==
The community is located within the registered Kurungal (WAD6217/98) native title claim area now native title determination WCD2015/116.

== Governance ==
The community is managed through its incorporated body, Kurungal Inc.

== Town planning ==
Wangkatjungka Layout Plan No.1 has been prepared in accordance with State Planning Policy 3.2 Aboriginal Settlements. Layout Plan No.1.

== School ==
There is Wangkatjungka Remote Community School (5101) run by WA Dept of Education with aboriginal teachers. It was opened in 1962 as Christmas Creek School. In 1990 the name of the school changed to Wangkutjungka Remote Community School. They use parts of the old school. The school is linked to mental health, paediatrics and dental services and nursing clinic.
