= Les Alliés =

Commune in Doubs, Bourgogne-Franche-Comté, France

- Commune
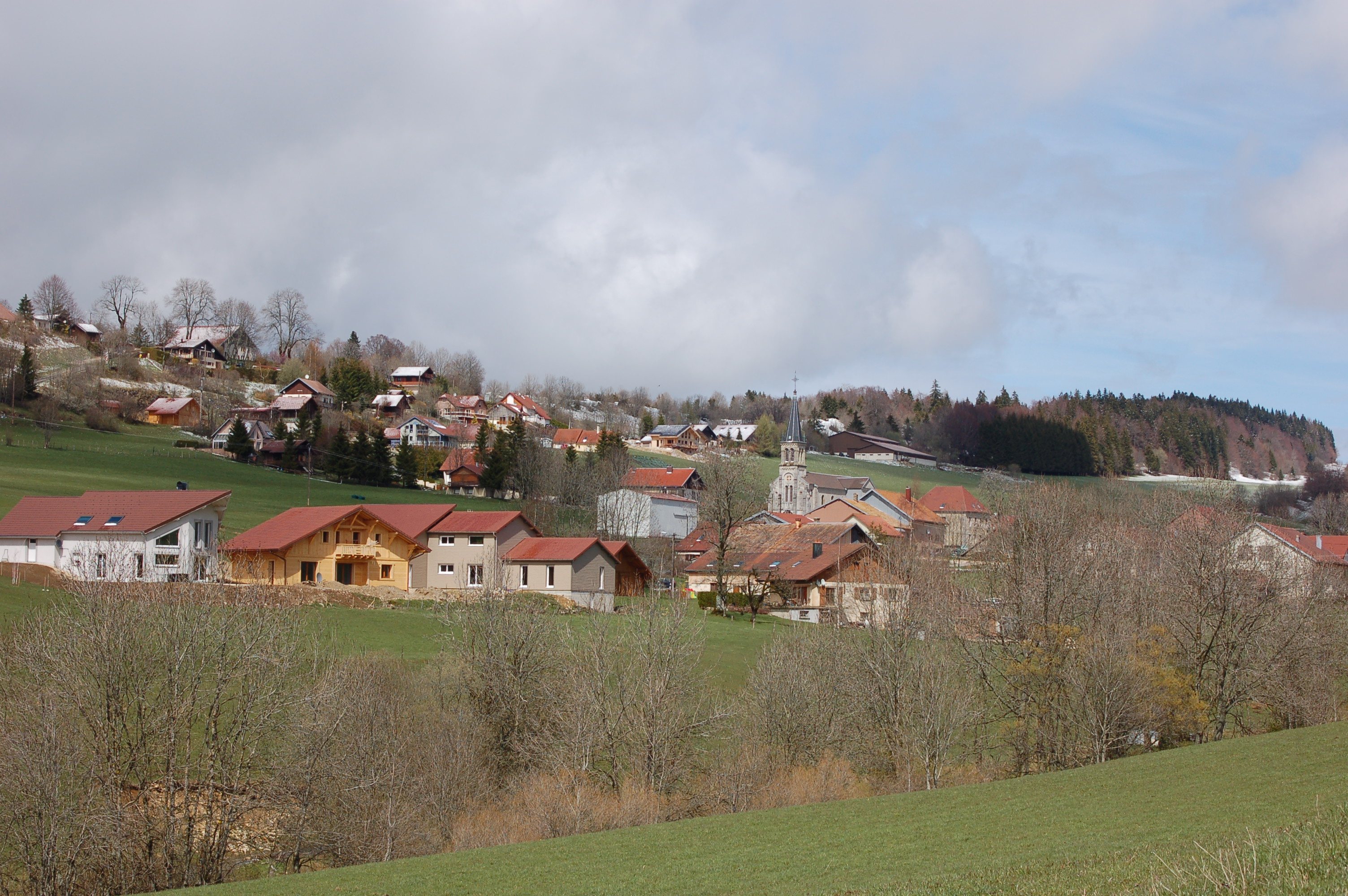
- A general view of Les Alliés
- Location of Les Alliés
- Location within France Location within Bourgogne-Franche-Comté
- Coordinates: 46°56′56″N 6°26′54″E
- Country: France
- Region: Bourgogne-Franche-Comté
- Department: Doubs
- Arrondissement: Pontarlier
- Canton: Ornans
- Intercommunality: CC entre Doubs et Loue

Government
  - Mayor (2022–2026): Pierre Millon
- Area^{1}: 5.28 km^{2} (2.04 sq mi)
- Highest elevation: 1,171 m (3,842 ft)
- Lowest elevation: 943 m (3,094 ft)
- Population (2023): 172
  - Density: 32.6/km^{2} (84.4/sq mi)
- Time zone: UTC+01:00 (CET)
  - Summer (DST): UTC+02:00 (CEST)
- INSEE/Postal code: 25012 /25300
- ^{1} French Land Register data, which excludes lakes, ponds, glaciers > 1 km^{2} (0.386 sq mi or 247 acres) and river estuaries.

Les Alliés (French pronunciation: [le.z‿alje]; Arpitan: Lèz Alman) is a commune in the Doubs department in the Bourgogne-Franche-Comté region in eastern France.

== Population ==
Historical population
Year	Pop.	±% p.a.
1968	61	—
1975	67	+1.35%
1982	63	−0.88%
1990	56	−1.46%
1999	103	+7.01%
2007	107	+0.48%
2012	131	+4.13%
2017	158	+3.82%
2023	172	+1.43%
Source: INSEE

== See also ==
- Communes of the Doubs department
