= Val-de-Travers District =

Coordinates: 46°54′45″N 6°36′45″E

Val-de-Travers District District du Val-de-Travers
- District
- Country: Switzerland
- Canton: Neuchâtel
- Capital: Val-de-Travers
- Dissolved: 1 January 2018

Area
  - Total: 166.47 km^{2} (64.27 sq mi)

Population (2017)
  - Total: 11,898
  - Density: 71.472/km^{2} (185.11/sq mi)
- Time zone: UTC+1 (CET)
  - Summer (DST): UTC+2 (CEST)
- Municipalities: 3

Val-de-Travers District was one of the six districts of the canton of Neuchâtel, Switzerland, until the district level was eliminated on 1 January 2018. It is famous for its clock industry. The Canton is largely rural and farming remains important, but it also had significant industry from the 17th century due to the hydro-power available at St Sulpice, and Asphalt was mined from 1711 to 1986 at Travers.

It had a population of 11,898.

== Municipalities ==
Between the creation of Val-de-Travers in 2009 and its elimination in 2018, three municipalities made up the district:

Coat of Arms	Municipality	Population (31 December 2020)	Area km^{2}
La Côte-aux-Fées	La Côte-aux-Fées	458	12.85
Les Verrières	Les Verrières	646	28.68
Val-de-Travers	Val-de-Travers	10,579	124.91
	Total	11,898	166.44

== Merger ==
- On 1 January 2009, the former municipalities of Boveresse, Buttes, Couvet, Fleurier, Les Bayards, Môtiers, Noiraigue, Saint-Sulpice and Travers merged to form Val-de-Travers.

== Demographics ==
Val-de-Travers had a population (as of 2017) of 11,898.

Most of the population (as of 2000) speaks French (10,858 or 89.2%) as their first language, German is the second most common (354 or 2.9%) and Italian is the third (337 or 2.8%). There are 7 people who speak Romansh.

As of 2008, the population was 48.7% male and 51.3% female. The population consisted of 4,680 Swiss men (39.2% of the population) and 1,146 (9.6%) non-Swiss men. There were 5,205 Swiss women (43.5%) and 921 (7.7%) non-Swiss women.

Of the population in the district, 3,709 or about 30.5% were born in Val-de-Travers and lived there in 2000. There were 3,592 or 29.5% who were born in the same canton, while 1,884 or 15.5% were born elsewhere in Switzerland, and 2,441 or 20.1% were born outside of Switzerland.

As of 2000, there were 4,607 people who were single and never married in the district. There were 5,859 married individuals, 1,025 widows or widowers and 683 individuals who are divorced.

There were 1,815 households that consist of only one person and 311 households with five or more people.

The historical population is given in the following chart:

== Politics ==
In the 2007 federal election the most popular party was the SVP which received 31.57% of the vote. The next three most popular parties were the SP (22.93%), the FDP (16.2%) and the LPS Party (10.9%). In the federal election, a total of 3,876 votes were cast, and the voter turnout was 46.3%.

== Religion ==
From the 2000 census, 5,521 or 45.4% belonged to the Swiss Reformed Church, while 3,476 or 28.6% were Roman Catholic. Of the rest of the population, there were 43 members of an Orthodox church (or about 0.35% of the population), there were 21 individuals (or about 0.17% of the population) who belonged to the Christian Catholic Church, and there were 801 individuals (or about 6.58% of the population) who belonged to another Christian church. There were 6 individuals (or about 0.05% of the population) who were Jewish, and 287 (or about 2.36% of the population) who were Islamic. There were 5 individuals who were Buddhist, 3 individuals who were Hindu and 23 individuals who belonged to another church. 1,713 (or about 14.07% of the population) belonged to no church, are agnostic or atheist, and 669 individuals (or about 5.50% of the population) did not answer the question.

== Education ==
In Val-de-Travers about 4,030 or (33.1%) of the population have completed non-mandatory upper secondary education, and 940 or (7.7%) have completed additional higher education (either university or a Fachhochschule). Of the 940 who completed tertiary schooling, 56.1% were Swiss men, 26.3% were Swiss women, 12.6% were non-Swiss men and 5.1% were non-Swiss women.

In the canton of Neuchâtel most municipalities provide two years of non-mandatory kindergarten, followed by five years of mandatory primary education. The next four years of mandatory secondary education is provided at thirteen larger secondary schools, which many students travel out of their home municipality to attend. During the 2010-11 school year, there were 12 kindergarten classes with a total of 220 students in District du Val-de-Travers. In the same year, there were 32 primary classes with a total of 579 students.
