= Travers, Switzerland =

Travers
- Former municipality
- Coat of arms
- Location of Travers
- Location within Switzerland Location within Canton of Neuchâtel
- Coordinates: 46°57′N 6°41′E
- Country: Switzerland
- Canton: Neuchâtel
- District: Val-de-Travers

Area
  - Total: 24.65 km^{2} (9.52 sq mi)
- Elevation: 735 m (2,411 ft)

Population (December 2007)
  - Total: 1,226
  - Density: 49.74/km^{2} (128.8/sq mi)
- Time zone: UTC+01:00 (CET)
  - Summer (DST): UTC+02:00 (CEST)
- Postal code: 2105
- SFOS number: 6510
- ISO 3166 code: CH-NE
- Surrounded by: Brot-Plamboz, Couvet, Gorgier, La Brévine, Les Ponts-de-Martel, Noiraigue, Provence (VD)
- Website: SFSO statistics

Travers was a municipality in the district of Val-de-Travers in the canton of Neuchâtel in Switzerland. On 1 January 2009, the former municipalities of Boveresse, Buttes, Couvet, Fleurier, Les Bayards, Môtiers, Noiraigue, Saint-Sulpice and Travers merged to form Val-de-Travers.

Aerial view from by Walter Mittelholzer (1919)

== Notable people ==
- Jérôme Franel, mathematician, born in 1859 in Travers
