= Les Bayards =

- Former municipality
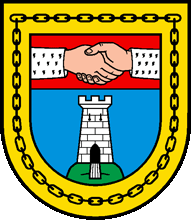
- Coat of arms
- Location of Les Bayards
- Location within Switzerland Location within Canton of Neuchâtel
- Coordinates: 46°55′N 6°31′E
- Country: Switzerland
- Canton: Neuchâtel
- District: Val-de-Travers

Area
  - Total: 19.15 km^{2} (7.39 sq mi)
- Elevation: 980 m (3,220 ft)

Population (December 2005)
  - Total: 370
  - Density: 19/km^{2} (50/sq mi)
- Time zone: UTC+01:00 (CET)
  - Summer (DST): UTC+02:00 (CEST)
- Postal code: 2127
- SFOS number: 6501
- ISO 3166 code: CH-NE
- Surrounded by: Buttes, Hauterive-la-Fresse (FR-25), La Brévine, Les Alliés (FR-25), Les Verrières, Saint-Sulpice
- Website: www.les-bayards.com

Les Bayards was a municipality in the district of Val-de-Travers in the canton of Neuchâtel in Switzerland. On 1 January 2009, the former municipalities of Boveresse, Buttes, Couvet, Fleurier, Les Bayards, Môtiers, Noiraigue, Saint-Sulpice and Travers merged to form Val-de-Travers.

Aerial view (1950)
