= Couvet =

- Former municipality
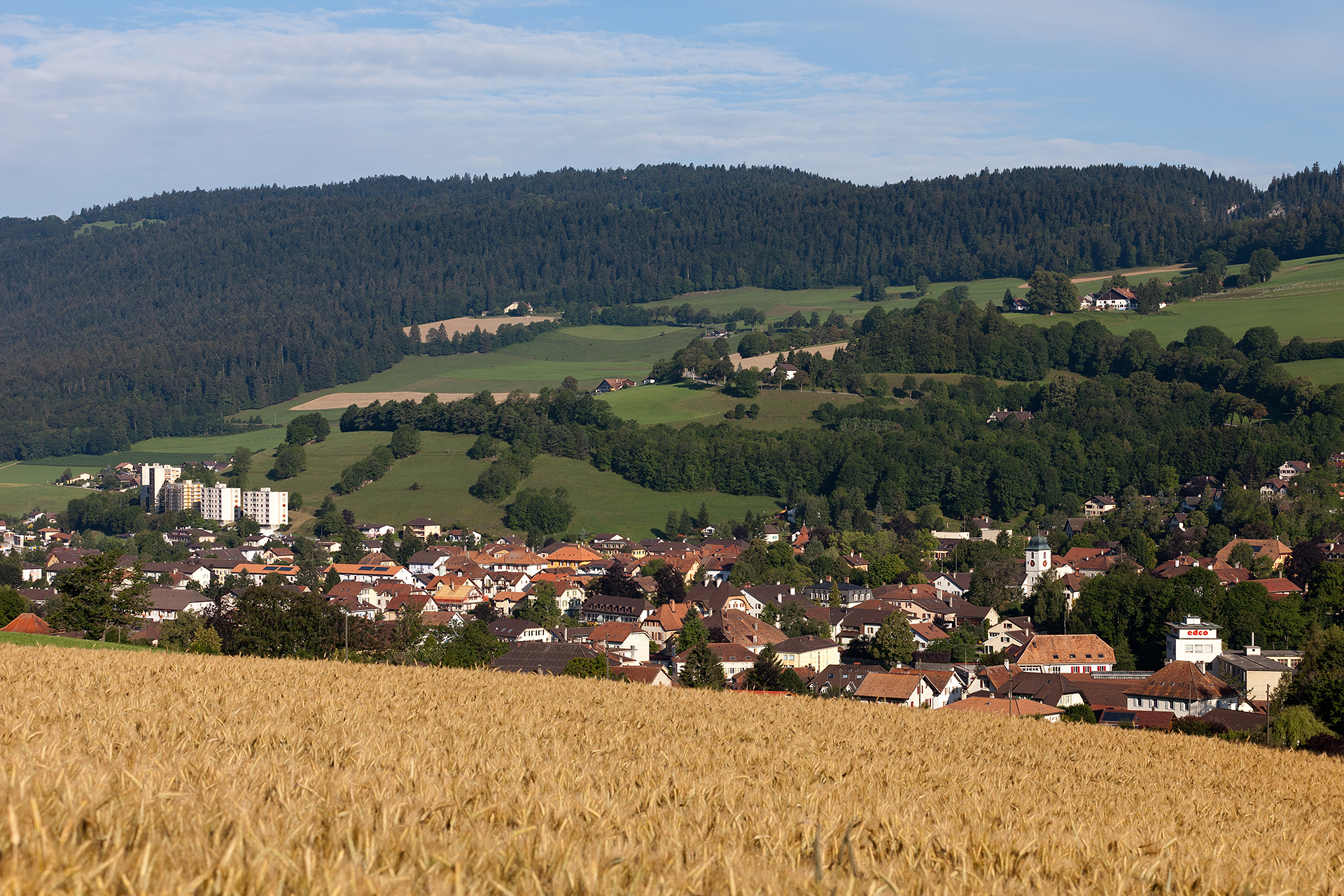

- Coat of arms
- Location of Couvet
- Location within Switzerland Location within Canton of Neuchâtel
- Coordinates: 46°55′N 6°38′E
- Country: Switzerland
- Canton: Neuchâtel
- District: Val-de-Travers

Area
  - Total: 16.41 km^{2} (6.34 sq mi)
- Elevation: 740 m (2,430 ft)

Population (December 2007)
  - Total: 2,755
  - Density: 167.9/km^{2} (434.8/sq mi)
- Time zone: UTC+01:00 (CET)
  - Summer (DST): UTC+02:00 (CEST)
- Postal code: 2108
- SFOS number: 6505
- ISO 3166 code: CH-NE
- Surrounded by: Boveresse, Môtiers, Travers
- Website: couvet.ne.ch

Couvet was a municipality in the district of Val-de-Travers in the canton of Neuchâtel in Switzerland. On 1 January 2009, the former municipalities of Boveresse, Buttes, Couvet, Fleurier, Les Bayards, Môtiers, Noiraigue, Saint-Sulpice and Travers merged to form the municipality of Val-de-Travers.

It is claimed that Couvet was the birthplace of absinthe at the end of the 18th century and it is now the home of La Clandestine Absinthe. It was also the home to Edouard Dubied & Co, a factory that used to make Industrial knitting machines, as well as bike parts and munitions for the Swiss Army.

== Personalities ==
- Emerich de Vattel, 18th century political philosopher
- Denis de Rougemont, 20th century author
