= Les Brenets =

- Former municipality
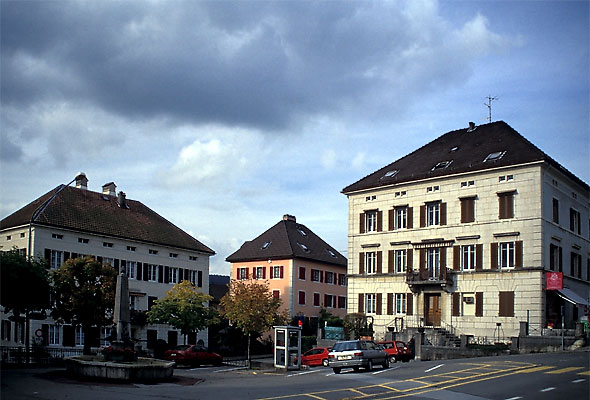
- Les Brenets village center

- Coat of arms
- Location of Les Brenets
- Location within Switzerland Location within Canton of Neuchâtel
- Coordinates: 47°4′N 6°42′E
- Country: Switzerland
- Canton: Neuchâtel

Area
  - Total: 11.53 km^{2} (4.45 sq mi)
- Elevation: 849 m (2,785 ft)

Population (December 2007)
  - Total: 1,104
  - Density: 95.75/km^{2} (248.0/sq mi)
- Time zone: UTC+01:00 (CET)
  - Summer (DST): UTC+02:00 (CEST)
- Postal code: 2416
- SFOS number: 6431
- ISO 3166 code: CH-NE
- Surrounded by: Le Locle, Les Planchettes, Villers-le-Lac (FR-25)
- Website: www.lesbrenets.ch

Les Brenets is a former municipality in the canton of Neuchâtel in Switzerland. On 1 January 2021 the former municipality of Les Brenets merged into Le Locle.

== History ==
Aerial view (1955)

Les Brenets is first mentioned in 1325 as chiez le Bruignet.

== Geography ==
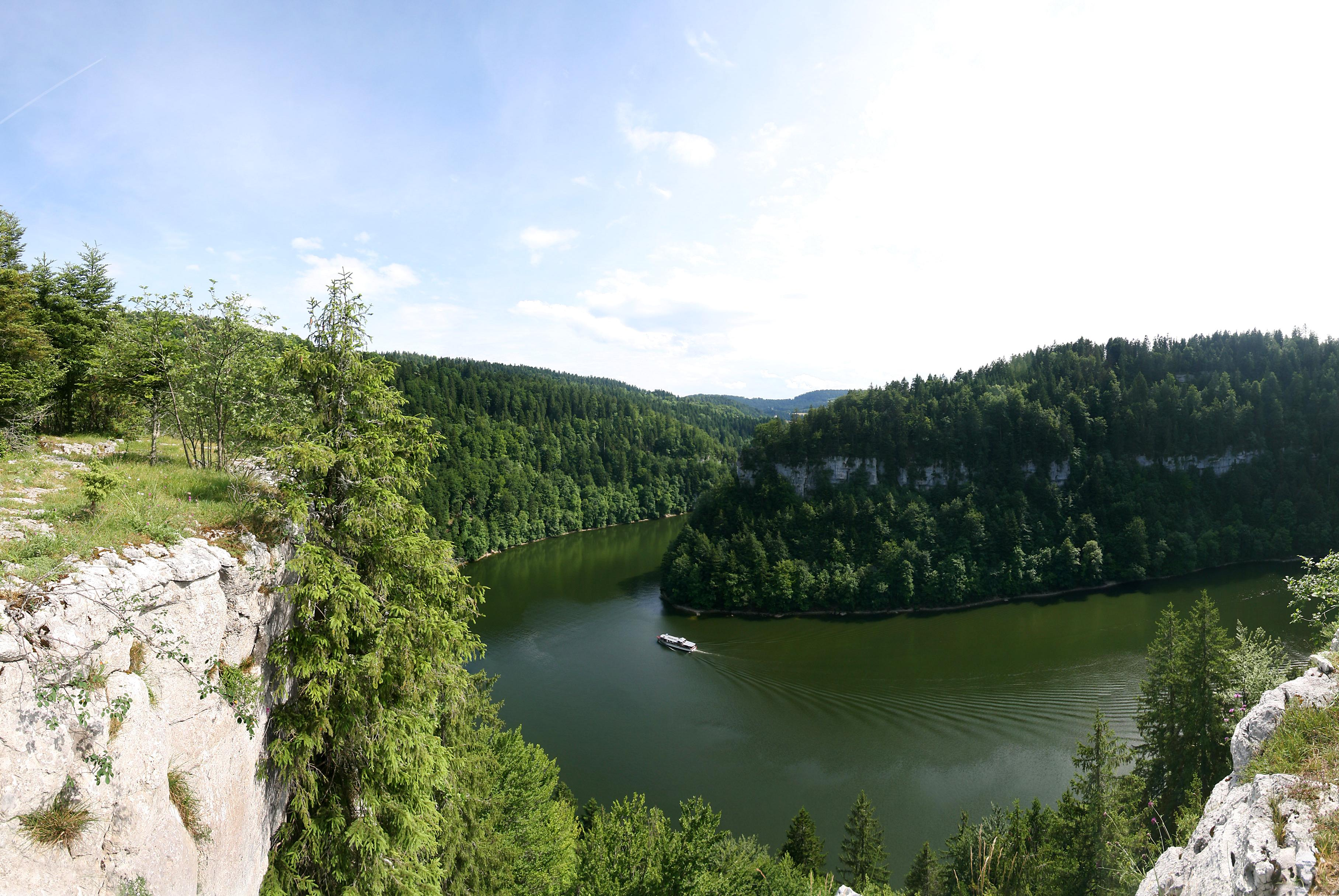
Doubs river at Les Brenets

Les Brenets had an area, as of 2009, of 11.5 square kilometers (4.4 mi^{2}). Of this area, 4.73 km^{2} (1.83 mi^{2}) or 41.0% is used for agricultural purposes, while 5.64 km^{2} (2.18 mi^{2}) or 48.9% is forested. Of the rest of the land, 0.72 km^{2} (0.28 mi^{2}) or 6.2% is settled (buildings or roads), 0.43 km^{2} (0.17 mi^{2}) or 3.7% is either rivers or lakes and 0.04 km^{2} (9.9 acres) or 0.3% is unproductive land.

Of the built up area, housing and buildings made up 3.4% and transportation infrastructure made up 1.8%. Out of the forested land, 44.1% of the total land area is heavily forested and 4.9% is covered with orchards or small clusters of trees. Of the agricultural land, 0.6% is used for growing crops and 25.5% is pastures and 14.7% is used for alpine pastures. Of the water in the municipality, 3.5% is in lakes and 0.3% is in rivers and streams.

The former municipality is located near Le Locle, on the northwestern slope of the Jura Mountains. The river Doubs forms the French border in the municipality.

Lac des Brenets on the Doubs is located in the municipality.

== Coat of arms ==
The blazon of the municipal coat of arms is Per fess by a bar chequy Or and Sable, in chief Gules a Chevron raised Argent, and in base Azure, a Waterfall falling from mountains with Pinetrees Vert. The waterfall is the Doubs Falls (French: Le Saut du Doubs) on the river Doubs between France and Switzerland.

== Demographics ==
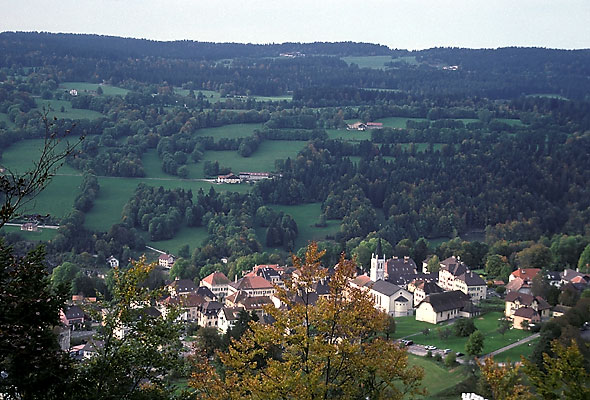
Les Brenets village

Les Brenets had a population (as of 2019) of 1,031. As of 2008, 11.6% of the population are resident foreign nationals. Over the last 10 years (2000–2010 ) the population has changed at a rate of -7.9%. It has changed at a rate of -7.2% due to migration and at a rate of 0.3% due to births and deaths.

Most of the population (as of 2000) speaks French (1,106 or 95.0%) as their first language, German is the second most common (23 or 2.0%) and Italian is the third (18 or 1.5%).

As of 2008, the population was 48.9% male and 51.1% female. The population was made up of 473 Swiss men (43.4% of the population) and 59 (5.4%) non-Swiss men. There were 499 Swiss women (45.8%) and 58 (5.3%) non-Swiss women. Of the population in the municipality, 342 or about 29.4% were born in Les Brenets and lived there in 2000. There were 382 or 32.8% who were born in the same canton, while 189 or 16.2% were born somewhere else in Switzerland, and 213 or 18.3% were born outside of Switzerland.

As of 2000, children and teenagers (0–19 years old) make up 23.4% of the population, while adults (20–64 years old) make up 59.4% and seniors (over 64 years old) make up 17.3%.

As of 2000, there were 416 people who were single and never married in the municipality. There were 584 married individuals, 81 widows or widowers and 83 individuals who are divorced.

As of 2000, there were 482 private households in the municipality, and an average of 2.3 persons per household. There were 142 households that consist of only one person and 32 households with five or more people. In 2000, a total of 461 apartments (84.1% of the total) were permanently occupied, while 56 apartments (10.2%) were seasonally occupied and 31 apartments (5.7%) were empty. The vacancy rate for the municipality, in 2010, was 5.47%.

The historical population is given in the following chart:

== Sights ==
The entire village of Les Brenets is designated as part of the Inventory of Swiss Heritage Sites

== Politics ==
In the 2007 federal election the most popular party was the SP which received 24.03% of the vote. The next three most popular parties were the SVP (22.07%), the LPS Party (18.76%) and the PdA Party (15.91%). In the federal election, a total of 446 votes were cast, and the voter turnout was 53.6%.

== Economy ==
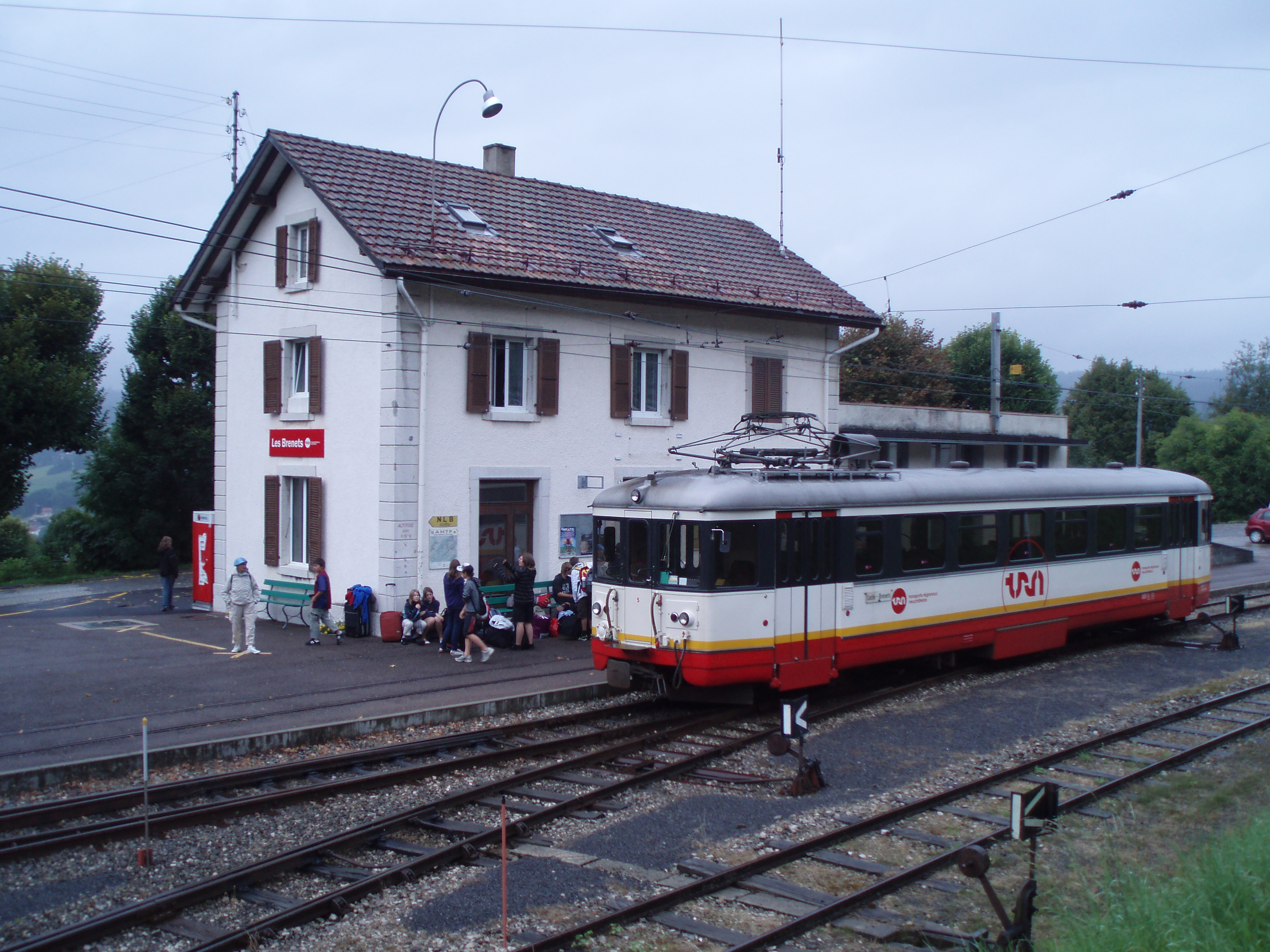
Les Brenets train station

As of 2010, Les Brenets had an unemployment rate of 5.2%. As of 2008, there were 39 people employed in the primary economic sector and about 17 businesses involved in this sector. 749 people were employed in the secondary sector and there were 24 businesses in this sector. 141 people were employed in the tertiary sector, with 31 businesses in this sector. There were 574 residents of the municipality who were employed in some capacity, of which females made up 45.8% of the workforce.

In 2008 the total number of full-time equivalent jobs was 843. The number of jobs in the primary sector was 29, all of which were in agriculture. The number of jobs in the secondary sector was 706 of which 697 or (98.7%) were in manufacturing and 4 (0.6%) were in construction. The number of jobs in the tertiary sector was 108. In the tertiary sector; 36 or 33.3% were in wholesale or retail sales or the repair of motor vehicles, 10 or 9.3% were in the movement and storage of goods, 18 or 16.7% were in a hotel or restaurant, 2 or 1.9% were the insurance or financial industry, 2 or 1.9% were technical professionals or scientists, 5 or 4.6% were in education and 30 or 27.8% were in health care.

In 2000, there were 867 workers who commuted into the municipality and 349 workers who commuted away. The municipality is a net importer of workers, with about 2.5 workers entering the municipality for every one leaving. About 43.1% of the workforce coming into Les Brenets are coming from outside Switzerland, while 0.0% of the locals commute out of Switzerland for work. Of the working population, 8.5% used public transportation to get to work, and 62% used a private car.

== Religion ==
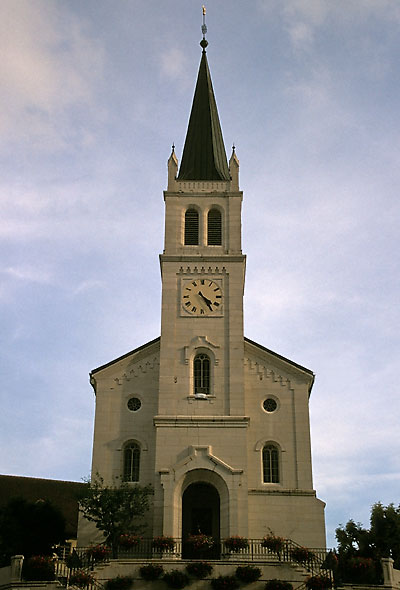
Les Brenets: reformed church

From the 2000 census, 394 or 33.8% were Roman Catholic, while 475 or 40.8% belonged to the Swiss Reformed Church. Of the rest of the population, there were 2 members of an Orthodox church (or about 0.17% of the population), there were 2 individuals (or about 0.17% of the population) who belonged to the Christian Catholic Church, and there were 39 individuals (or about 3.35% of the population) who belonged to another Christian church. There were 10 (or about 0.86% of the population) who were Islamic. There was 1 person who was Buddhist and 2 individuals who belonged to another church. 204 (or about 17.53% of the population) belonged to no church, are agnostic or atheist, and 54 individuals (or about 4.64% of the population) did not answer the question.

== Education ==
In Les Brenets about 461 or (39.6%) of the population have completed non-mandatory upper secondary education, and 113 or (9.7%) have completed additional higher education (either university or a Fachhochschule). Of the 113 who completed tertiary schooling, 59.3% were Swiss men, 25.7% were Swiss women, 8.8% were non-Swiss men and 6.2% were non-Swiss women.

In the canton of Neuchâtel most municipalities provide two years of non-mandatory kindergarten, followed by five years of mandatory primary education. The next four years of mandatory secondary education is provided at thirteen larger secondary schools, which many students travel out of their home municipality to attend. During the 2010-11 school year, there was one kindergarten class with a total of 23 students in Les Brenets. In the same year, there were 3 primary classes with a total of 60 students.

As of 2000, there were 2 students in Les Brenets who came from another municipality, while 113 residents attended schools outside the municipality.
