= Paul Konrad =

Swiss geometrician and amateur mycologist

Paul Konrad (1 April 1877 in Le Locle – 19 December 1948 in Neuchâtel) was a Swiss geometrician and amateur mycologist.

From 1902 he was an employee of the Compagnie des Tramways de Neuchâtel, of which, he served as a director from 1938 to 1948.

In 1918 he became a member of the Société mycologique de France, and for a number of years was associated with the Société linnéenne de Lyon (1927–48). In 1932 he received an honorary doctorate in sciences from the University of Neuchâtel.

== Selected writings ==
- Notes critiques sur quelques champignons du Jura (4 parts, 1923–29) – Critique on some mushrooms of the Jura.
- Révision des Hyménomycètes de France et des pays limitrophes; with André Maublanc (1924) – Revision on Hymenomycetes of France and neighboring countries.
- Icones Selectae Fungorum; with André Maublanc (6 parts, 1924–27).
- Note sur le Boletus pulverulentus Opatowski; with René Maire (1927) – On Boletus pulverulentus.
- Les Agaricales. Classification, revision des espèces, iconographie, comestibilité, with André Maublanc (1948) – Agaricales; classification. revision of species, iconography, edibility.

In 1949 mycologist Eugène Mayor published Konrad's necrology in the journal "Bulletin de la Société neuchâteloise des sciences naturelles".
