= Cathaemasiidae =

Scientific classification
- Kingdom: Animalia
- Phylum: Platyhelminthes
- Class: Trematoda
- Order: Plagiorchiida
- Suborder: Echinostomata
- Family: Cathaemasiidae; Fuhrmann, 1928

Family of flatworms

Cathaemasiidae is a family of flatworms belonging to the order Plagiorchiida.

Genera:

- Cathaemasia Looss, 1899
- Cathaemasioides Teixeira de Freitas, 1941
- Pulchrosoma Travassos, 1916
- Reesella Mettrick, 1956
