= Le Locle =

- Municipality
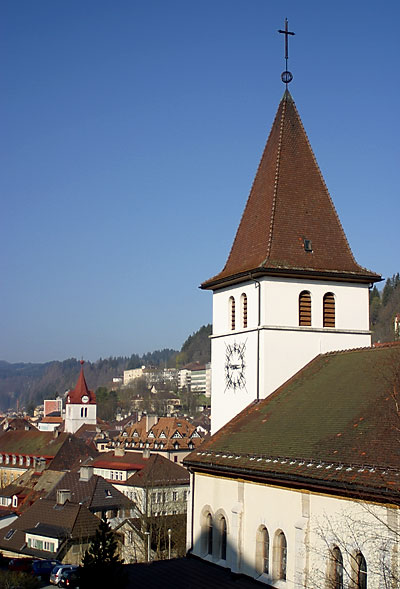

- Flag Coat of arms
- Location of Le Locle
- Location within Switzerland Location within Canton of Neuchâtel
- Coordinates: 47°03′11″N 6°44′53″E
- Country: Switzerland
- Canton: Neuchâtel

Government
  - Executive: Conseil communal with 5 members
  - Mayor: Président du Conseil communal (list); Denis de la Reussille (as of March 2014)
  - Parliament: Conseil général with 41 members

Area
  - Total: 23.14 km^{2} (8.93 sq mi)
- Elevation: 945 m (3,100 ft)

Population (2013)
  - Total: 10,422
  - Density: 450.4/km^{2} (1,167/sq mi)
- Time zone: UTC+01:00 (CET)
  - Summer (DST): UTC+02:00 (CEST)
- Postal code: 2400
- SFOS number: 6436
- ISO 3166 code: CH-NE
- Surrounded by: La Chaux-de-Fonds, La Chaux-du-Milieu, La Sagne, Le Cerneux-Péquignot, Les Brenets, Les Planchettes, Les Ponts-de-Martel, Villers-le-Lac (FR-25)
- Website: www.lelocle.ch

Le Locle
UNESCO World Heritage Site
- Interactive map of Le Locle
- Part of: La Chaux-de-Fonds / Le Locle, Watchmaking Town Planning
- Criteria: Cultural: (iv)
- Reference: 114719
- Inscription: 2009 (33rd Session)
- Area: 70.2 ha (173 acres)
- Buffer zone: 1,620.2 ha (4,004 acres)

Le Locle (French pronunciation: [lə lɔkl]; German: Luggli) is a municipality in the Canton of Neuchâtel in Switzerland.

It is situated in the Jura Mountains, a few kilometers from the city of La Chaux-de-Fonds. It is the third smallest city in Switzerland (in Switzerland a place needs more than 10,000 inhabitants to be considered a city).

Le Locle is known as a center of Swiss watchmaking, even cited as the birthplace of the industry, with roots dating back to the 1600s. The municipality has been home to manufactures such as Favre-Leuba, Mido, Zodiac, Tissot, Ulysse Nardin, Zenith, Montblanc, Certina as well as Universal Genève, before the latter relocated to Geneva. The town's history in watchmaking is documented at one of the world's premier horological museums, the Musée d'Horlogerie du Locle, Monts Castle, located in a 19th-century country manor on a hill north of the city. Restored historic underground mills (grainmill, oilmill, sawmill) can be seen in a cave located about one kilometer (0.6 miles) west of the city center.

The name of the town derives from the word for lake or trou d'eau.

== Unesco World Heritage Sites ==
Le Locle, as well as La Chaux-de-Fonds, owes its survival to the manufacturing and exports of watches. The industry of watch making was brought to Le Locle in the 17th century by Daniel Jeanrichard, a self-taught watchmaker who encouraged the farmers of the area to start manufacturing watch components for him during the long winters. In the 20th century, the micro-mechanical industry was added.

The watchmaking cities of Le Locle and La Chaux-de-Fonds have jointly received recognition from UNESCO for their universal value.

Due to the altitude (around 1,000 m (3,300 ft)) and the lack of water (porous limestone underground) the land is ill-suited to farming. Planning and buildings reflect the watch-making artisans' need for rational organization. They were rebuilt in the early 19th century, after extensive fires.

Along an open-ended scheme of parallel strips on which residential housing and workshops intermingle, their town planning reflects the needs of the local watch-making culture that dates back to the 17th century, and which is still alive today. Both towns present outstanding examples of mono-industrial manufacturing towns, which are still well-preserved and active. Their urban planning has accommodated the transition from the artisans’ production of a cottage industry to the more concentrated factory production of the late 19th and 20th centuries.

Karl Marx described La Chaux-de-Fonds as a “huge factory-town” in Das Kapital, where he analyzed the division of labour in the watch-making industry of the Jura.

It is the tenth Swiss site to be awarded World Heritage status, joining others such as the Old City of Bern, the Rhaetian Railway, and the Abbey and Convent of St. Gall.

== History ==
Le Locle is first mentioned in 1332 as dou Locle.

=== Prehistory ===
The earliest traces of human settlements come from the end of the Mesolithic period (6000–5000 BC) in shelter in the Col des Roches. The site includes the oldest pottery found in the Canton of Neuchâtel, along with many tools, the molar of a mammoth and deer and wild boar bones. The shelter was discovered in 1926 by a customs official and was the first site of its kind studied in Switzerland.

However, between 4000 BC and the Middle Ages nothing is known about the Le Locle area.

=== Middle Ages ===
In 1150 the valley, in which Le Locle would later be built, was granted by Renaud and William Valanginian to the abbey of Fontaine-André. In 1360, John II of Aarberg, the Lord of Valanginian, received Le Locle as a fief from Count Louis of Neuchâtel. The heavily wooded portion of the Jura Mountains around Le Locle, were cleared by colonists who later received the status of free peasants. These first free farmers received a charter in 1372 which codified their rights and freedoms. At the beginning of the 15th century, this charter was reconfirmed during the foundation of the Mairie or town government. The inhabitants of Le Locle were given the right to own land that they had cleared, as long as they continued to farm it and paid taxes on it. The feudal lords granted them these freedoms to encourage settlements in the mountains. Beginning in the 14th century Le Locle and La Sagne formed a parish together. The Church of Mary Magdalene in Le Locle was built in 1351.

As a result of increasing cross-border conflicts, in 1476, Le Locle entered into a defensive alliance with Bern.

In 1502, 37 people in Le Locle were given the opportunity to pay £1780 for the title of "Citizen of Valangin". These citizens had the privilege to lead the community and to choose their own mayor and bailiff.

=== Early modern era ===
The tower of the Church of Mary Magdalene, the landmark of the city, arose early in the 16th century. A few years after the tower was built, in 1536, Le Locle converted to the Protestant faith. This old church was rebuilt in the mid-18th century. A German church was built in 1844, but demolished in 1967. The Catholic chapel was built in 1861.

In 1592, the Valangin fiefs returned to the County of Neuchâtel, but neither the legal status of residents of the Mairie of Le Locle or its function as a district court was affected. The 1476 alliance with Bern remained in effect and during the Thirty Years' War as well as the invasion of Louis XIV in Franche-Comté, Bernese soldiers came to support the town. Le Locle sent soldiers to support their ally in 1712 during the battles of Mellingen and Villmergen.

Le Locle's location near the French border meant that the town often enjoyed a close relationship with France. This was especially true during the years leading up to the French Revolution. Many residents of Le Locle met in the Jacobin club in Morteau to swear their support of the Constitution of 1792. The revolutionary spirit led to conflicts between supporters of the revolution and the old government. The subsequent government repression drove many residents of Le Locle into exile in the spring of 1793. Several hundred people moved to Besançon, where they found work at the National Watch Factory which had been established by the National Convention. When they returned to Le Locle, they brought skilled watchmakers along with a republican attitude.

In 1707, the Principality of Neuchâtel went to King Frederick I in Prussia of the Berlin-based Hohenzollern, who then ruled Neuchâtel in personal union. Napoléon Bonaparte deposed King Frederick William III of Prussia as prince of Neuchâtel and appointed instead his chief of staff Louis-Alexandre Berthier. In 1814 the principality was restored to Frederick William III. A year later he agreed to allow the principality to join the Swiss Confederation, then not yet an integrated federation, but a confederacy, as a full member. Thus Neuchâtel became the first and only monarchy to join the otherwise entirely republican Swiss cantons. This changed in 1848, when the peaceful Neuchâtel Revolution started in Le Locle. The royalist forces quickly surrendered and on 28 February 1848, the flag of the Helvetic Republic, a symbol of the republic, was hoisted over the city. The new republic and canton established the Le Locle Prefecture, which existed until 1935. During the unsuccessful counter-revolution of 1856 the town was briefly occupied by the royalists.

Le Locle was repeatedly burned by large fires (1683, 1765, 1833). It was rebuilt to its present appearance in the second quarter of the 19th century, as it became a center of the watch industry.

=== Modern era ===
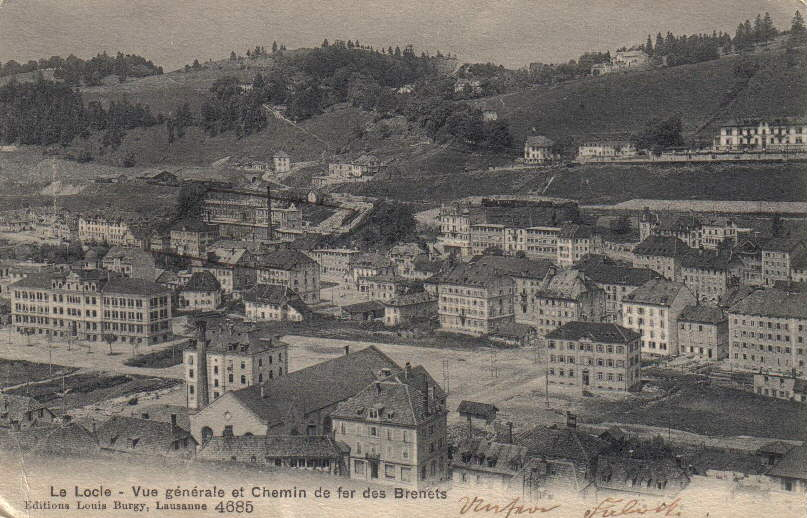
Le Locle in 1907

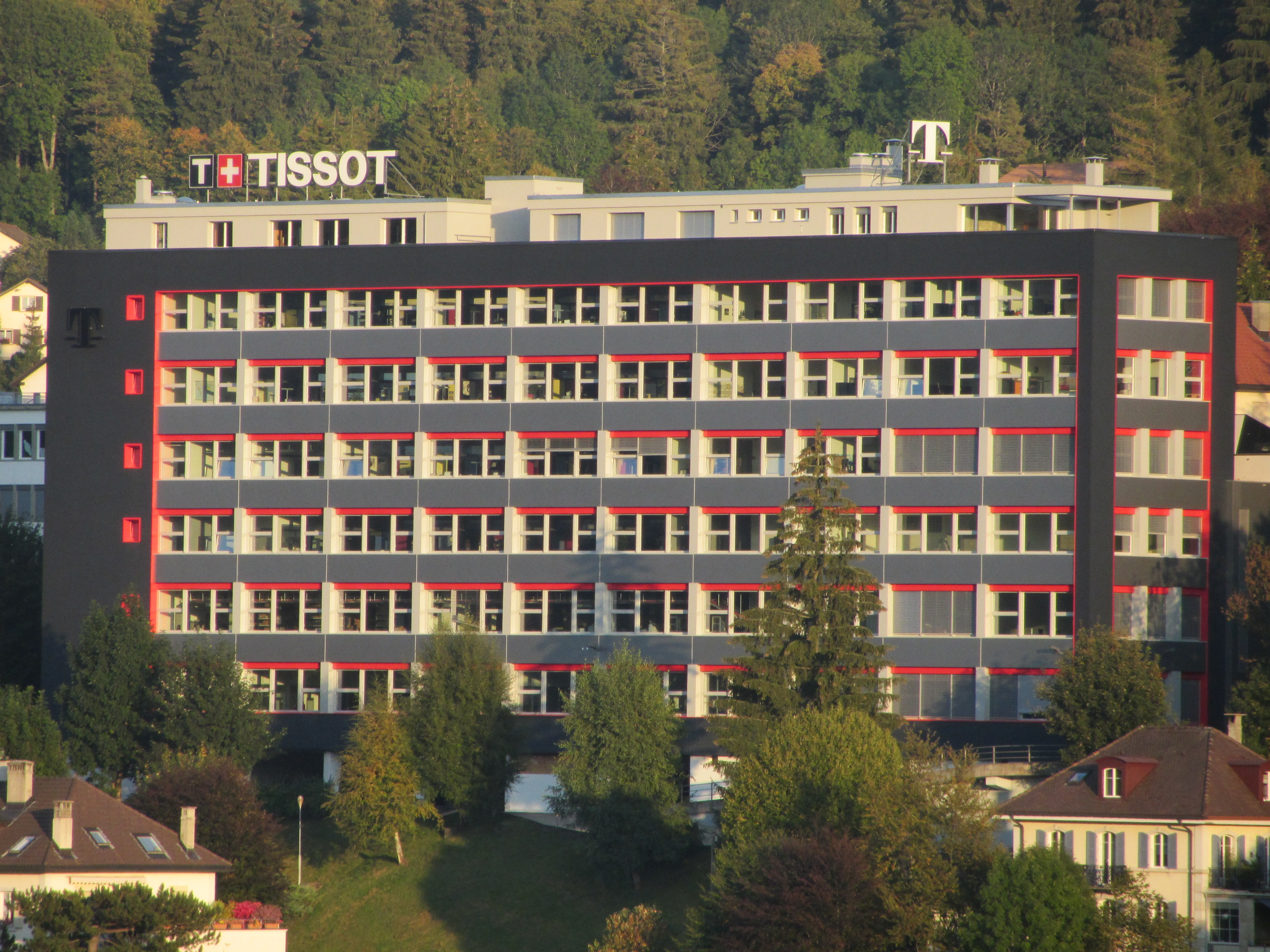
Tissot factory in Le Locle

Because the small Bied river often flooded the valley, a channel was cut through the valley to the Col des Roches at the beginning of the 19th century. Until 1898 the river was used to provide power for several underground mills.

The city government established the high school in 1855 and opened a teacher training college in 1866 followed by a trade school in 1897. The watchmaking school was established in 1868 which was the foundation for the technical school established in 1901–02. This school eventually became the Engineering Department of the Haute école d'arts appliqués Arc as well as the engineering school of the inter-regional vocational education center Montagnes neuchâteloises.

The city made great efforts in the construction of railways. The first line to La Chaux-de-Fonds (1857) was joined by lines to Besançon (1884) and Les Brenets (1890). Nevertheless, Le Locle suffers from a certain isolation and a large amount of traffic that is only passing through.

Le Locle owes its prosperity essentially to the watch industry, in particular the manufacture of precision watches and machine tools. Daniel Jeanrichard was among the pioneers who founded this branch of industry in and around Le Locle. In the Le Locle region, there were only some 77 watchmakers who were active in 1750. By 1800, that number had increased to over 800. Watchmaking began to replace agriculture and lace making as the main industries. By the end of the 18th century, the city employed about 500 lace makers.

One of the first anarchist newspapers in history, Le Bulletin de la Fédération jurassienne, was published in the city for a time before moving to La Chaux-de-Fonds.

Le Locle was home to a number of famous watchmakers and inventors, including Abraham-Louis Perrelet, Jacques-Frédéric Houriet, Frédéric-Louis Favre-Bulle and David-Henri Grandjean. Watch manufacturers such as Tissot, Zenith, Ulysse Nardin, Universal Genève, and Doxa all trace their roots to Le Locle. In the 19th century the town was known for its pocket and marine chronometers. The watchmaking industry transformed Le Locle into an industrial city. Initially all the work was done by hand in small shops, but by the last quarter of the 19th century the first factories were built. The introduction of mechanized production, pushed the industry from completed watches toward machine tools and watch components. During the two World Wars, some plants, such as Zenith, later Dixi, specialized in the production of weapons. Watchmaking also required a number of associated artists and inventors. The bookseller and publisher Samuel Girardet (1730–1807) started decorating clock cases and eventually founded a dynasty of artists and engravers. The Huguenin became famous for their work painting clock housings and medals. Opening in 1856, the chocolate and confectionery factory Klaus operated until 1992.

As in most watchmaking cities in the Jura, the political and social life in Le Locle was heavily influenced by the ideas of radicalism, socialism and later anarchism. Professor James Guillaume proposed the creation of a section of the Workers International in 1866. German-speaking socialist organizations including the Grütliverein and the Arbeiterverein testify that by the end of the 19th century, many workers from the German-speaking Switzerland worked in Le Locle. The Socialists organized themselves into a political party in 1897 and by 1912 were a majority in the municipality. In 1956, they allied and were supported by the Swiss Party of Labour. The Socialists lost their seat in the local government council in the 1992 elections, to the movement Droit de parole, which does not have a traditional party platform. In 2004, for the first time the council was determined by a plebiscite, which gave the Swiss Party of Labour (PdA) three seats, the Social Democratic Party of Switzerland (PS) and the liberale Parti progressiste national one seat each.

=== Les Brenets ===
Les Brenets is first mentioned in 1325 as chiez le Bruignet.

== Geography ==
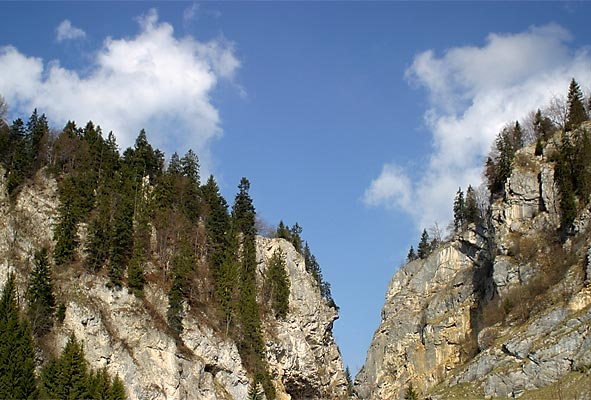
Col des Roches canyon

Aerial view (1959)

Le Locle is located on the Swiss side of the cluse (gorge) Col des Roches, which forms the border between France and Switzerland.

Le Locle has an area, (as of the 2004/09 survey), of 34.69 km^{2} (13.39 sq mi). Of this area, 12.41 km^{2} (4.79 mi^{2}) or 53.6% is used for agricultural purposes, while 6.91 km^{2} (2.67 mi^{2}) or 29.9% is forested. Of the rest of the land, 3.69 km^{2} (1.42 mi^{2}) or 15.9% is settled (buildings or roads) and 0.05 km^{2} (12.36 acres) or 0.2% is unproductive land.

Of the built up area, industrial buildings made up 1.4% of the total area while housing and buildings made up 7.7% and transportation infrastructure made up 4.7%. while parks, green belts and sports fields made up 1.3%. Out of the forested land, 26.7% of the total land area is heavily forested and 3.2% is covered with orchards or small clusters of trees. Of the agricultural land, 0.0% is used for growing crops and 33.8% is pastures and 19.6% is used for alpine pastures.

The former capital of the Le Locle district, until its elimination in 2018, is located at an elevation of 946 m (3,104 ft).

On 1 January 2021 the former municipality of Les Brenets merged into the municipality of Le Locle.

== Coat of arms ==
The blazon of the municipal coat of arms is Lozengy Gules and Or, on a Bar Argent a Barrulet wavy Azure, in Base on a panel Argent issuant from three mounts Vert as many Pine trees of the same. However, the official coat of arms (which is rarely used) is Quartered: bendy of eight serrated gules and vert in 1 and 4 and or five flamules azure issuant from the flank in 2 and 3, overall a cross argent.

== Demographics ==
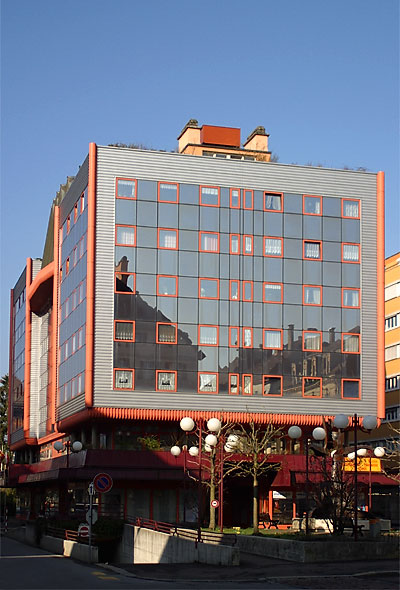
Hotel Trois Rois in Le Locle

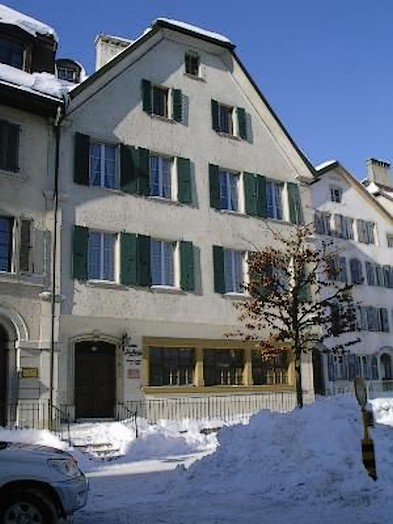
Maison duBois in Le Locle

Le Locle has a population (as of December 2020) of 9,864. As of 2008, 26.0% of the population are resident foreign nationals. Over the last 10 years (2000–2010) the population has changed at a rate of −2.8%. It has changed at a rate of 0% due to migration and at a rate of −2.2% due to births and deaths.

Most of the population (as of 2000) speaks French (9,264 or 88.0%) as their first language, Italian is the second most common (423 or 4.0%) and German is the third (203 or 1.9%). There are 6 people who speak Romansh.

As of 2008, the population was 49.2% male and 50.8% female. The population was made up of 3,593 Swiss men (35.7% of the population) and 1,354 (13.5%) non-Swiss men. There were 3,949 Swiss women (39.3%) and 1,156 (11.5%) non-Swiss women. Of the population in the municipality, 3,884 or about 36.9% were born in Le Locle and lived there in 2000. There were 1,882 or 17.9% who were born in the same canton, while 1,576 or 15.0% were born somewhere else in Switzerland, and 2,639 or 25.1% were born outside of Switzerland.

As of 2000, children and teenagers (0–19 years old) make up 22.5% of the population, while adults (20–64 years old) make up 56.8% and seniors (over 64 years old) make up 20.7%.

As of 2000, there were 3,891 people who were single and never married in the municipality. There were 5,133 married individuals, 867 widows or widowers and 638 individuals who are divorced.

As of 2000, there were 4,713 private households in the municipality, and an average of 2.1 persons per household. There were 1,787 households that consist of only one person and 229 households with five or more people. In 2000, a total of 4,584 apartments (81.3% of the total) were permanently occupied, while 391 apartments (6.9%) were seasonally occupied and 663 apartments (11.8%) were empty. As of 2009, the construction rate of new housing units was 0.1 new units per 1000 residents. The vacancy rate for the municipality, in 2010, was 5.71%.

The historical population is given in the following chart:

== Heritage sites of national significance ==
The Ancien Hôtel des Postes, Monts Castle and the Museum d’horlogerie, City Hall, the Immeuble, Moulins souterrains du Col-des-Roches (Cave mills in the Col des Roches), the Villa Favre-Jacot and Zenith SA are listed as Swiss heritage site of national significance. It is part of the UNESCO World Heritage Site: La Chaux-de-Fonds/Le Locle, Watchmaking Town Planning (since 2009) and the entire town of Le Locle and village of Les Brenets are part of the Inventory of Swiss Heritage Sites.

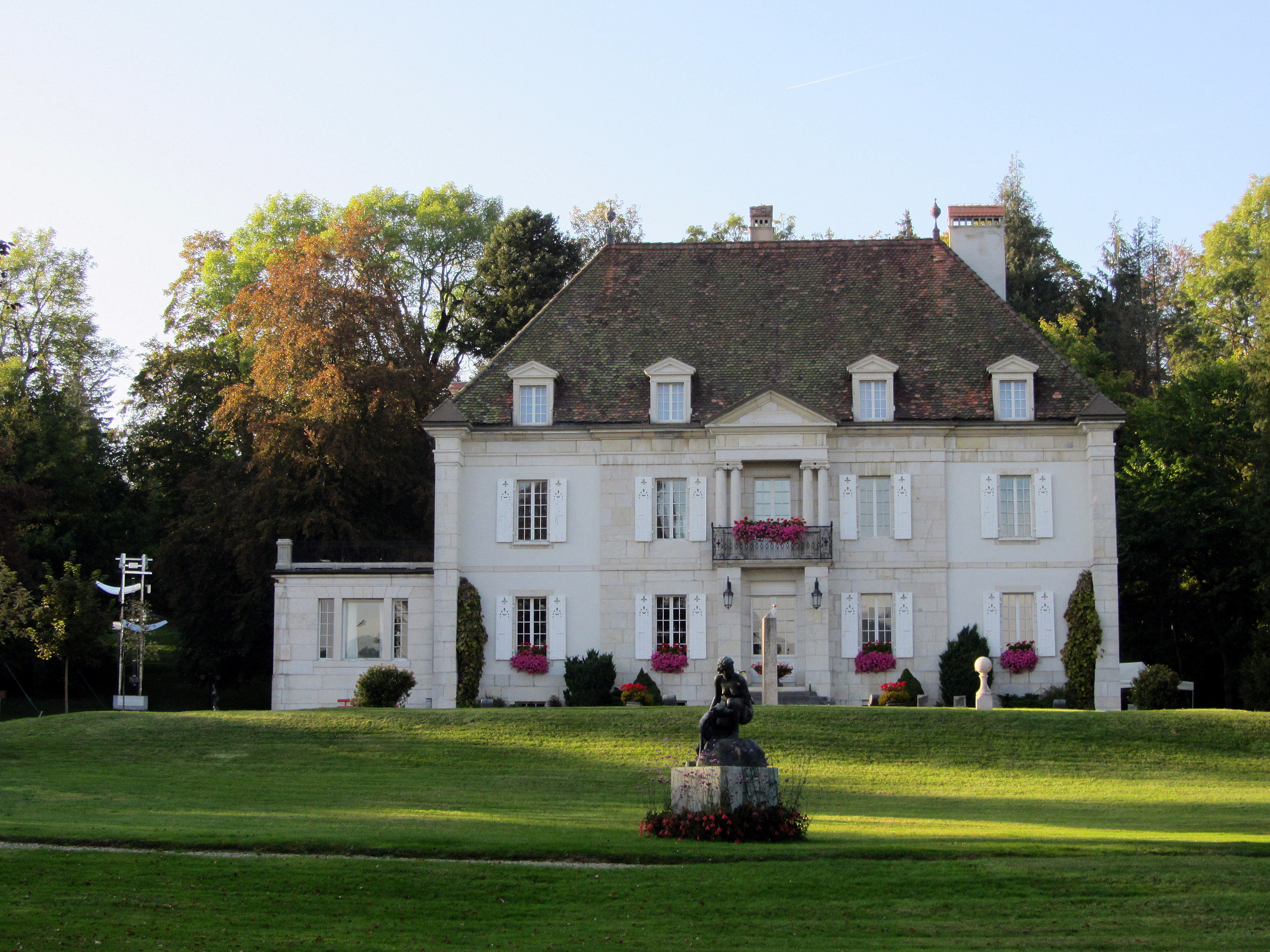
Château des Monts

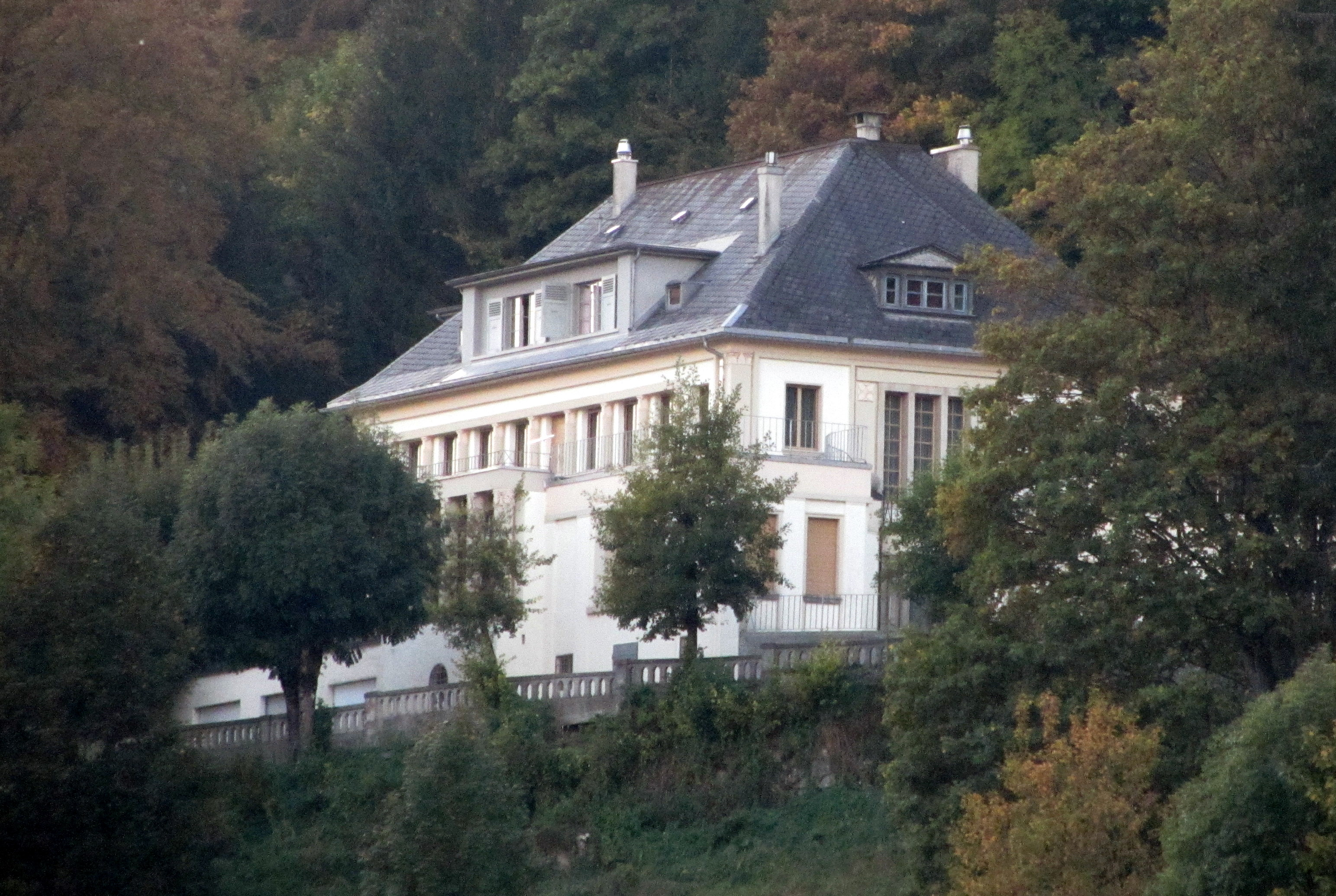
Villa Favre-Jacot

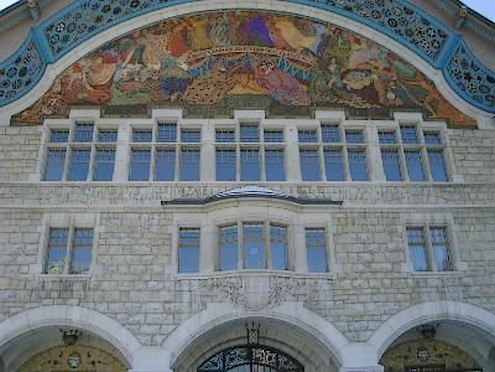
Town hall

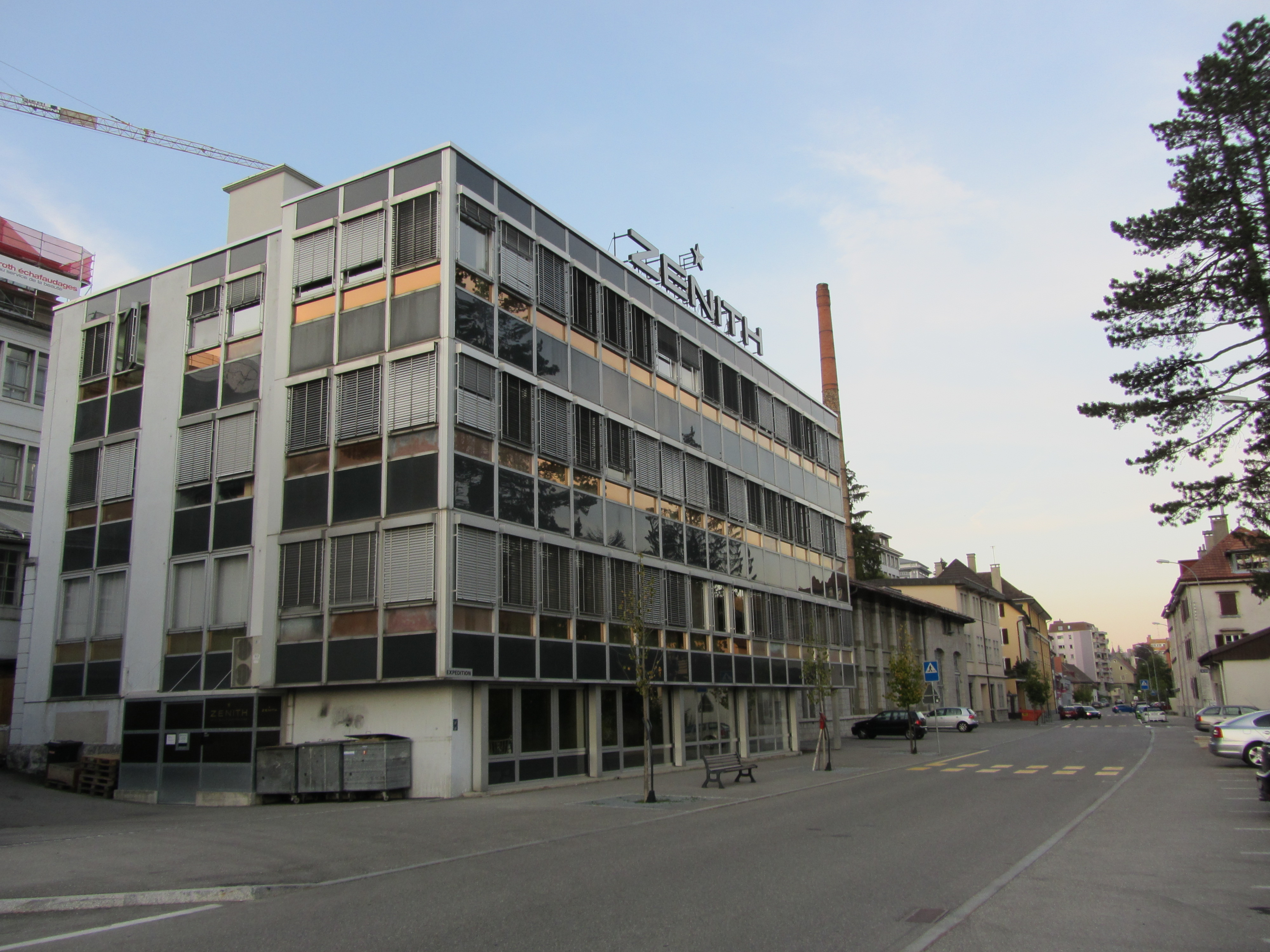
Zenith building

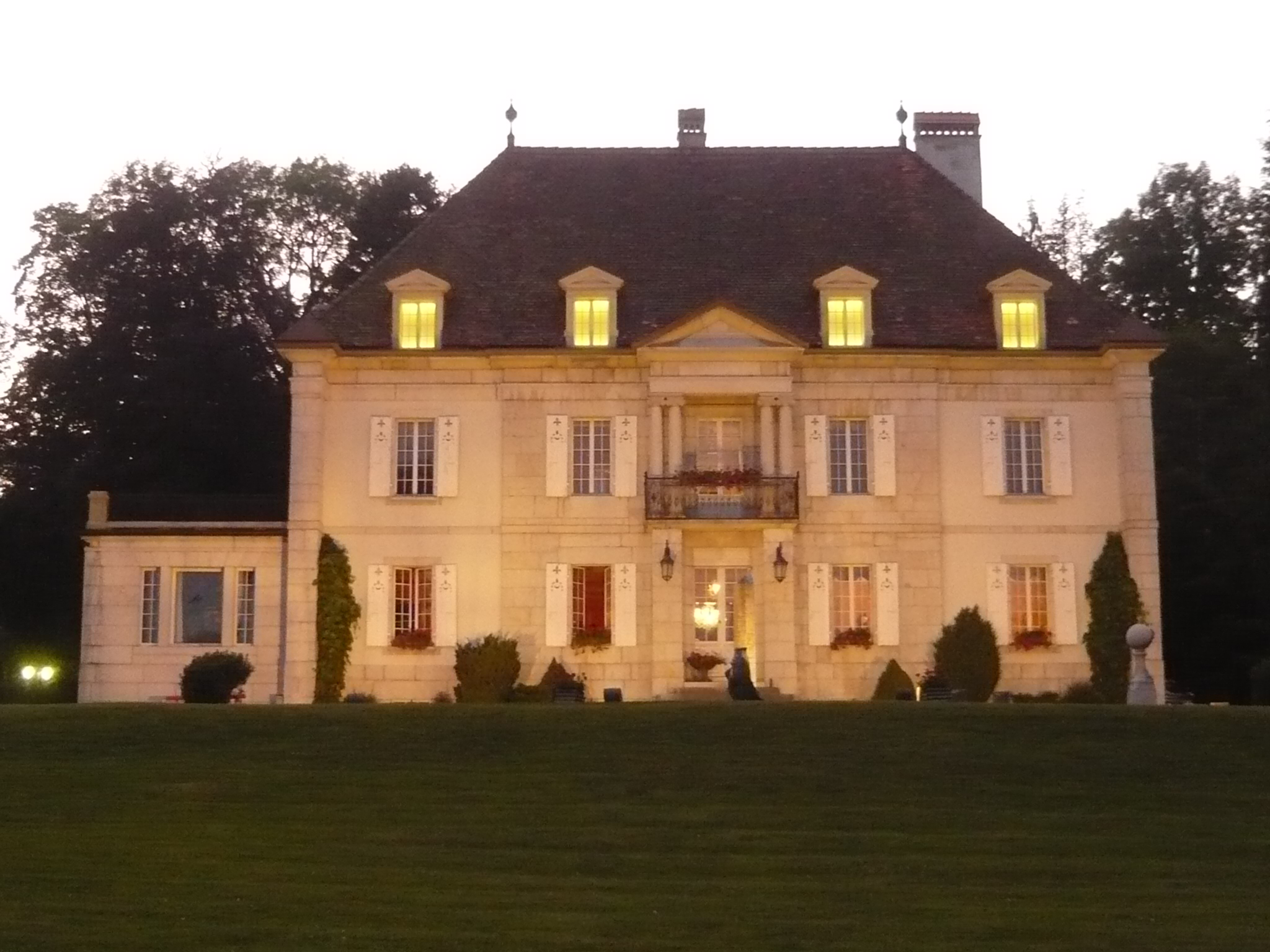
Watch Museum of Le Locle at Château des Monts

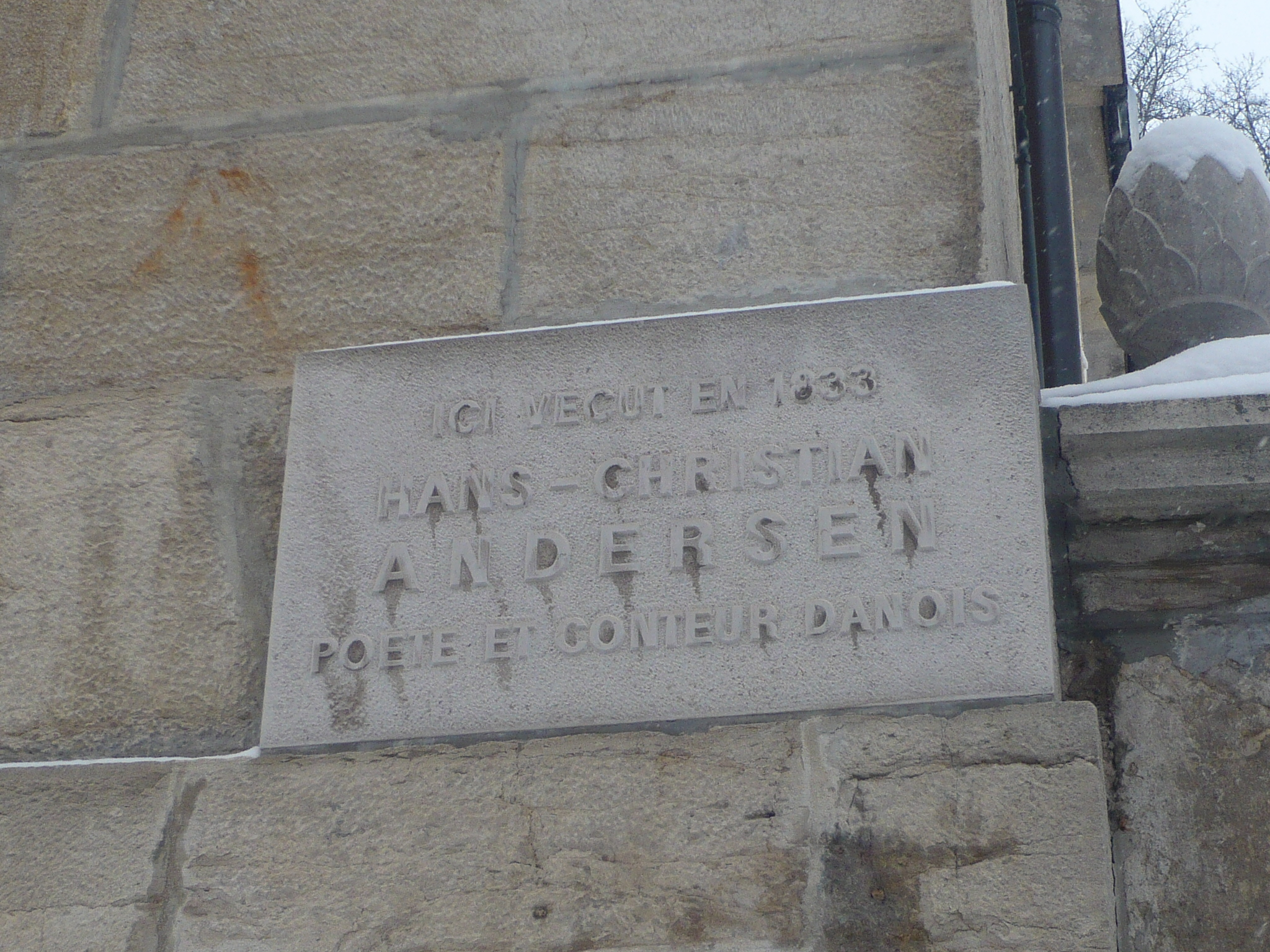
Street Crêt Vaillant 28, Houriet house

== Modern Art ==
Exomusée was born in 2018 with one painted wall. In 2025 this open-air museum shows 47 houses with masterpieces of urban art.

- https://exomusee.ch/

== Politics ==
In the 2007 federal election the most popular party was the PdA Party which received 24.8% of the vote. The next three most popular parties were the SP (22.38%), the SVP (20.57%) and the LPS Party (16.13%). In the federal election, a total of 3,204 votes were cast, and the voter turnout was 49.3%.

== Economy ==
As of 2010, Le Locle had an unemployment rate of 7.6%. As of 2008, there were 95 people employed in the primary economic sector and about 38 businesses involved in this sector. 5,355 people were employed in the secondary sector and there were 196 businesses in this sector. 2,409 people were employed in the tertiary sector, with 300 businesses in this sector. There were 4,855 residents of the municipality who were employed in some capacity, of which women made up 44.0% of the workforce.

In 2008 the total number of full-time equivalent jobs was 7,160. The number of jobs in the primary sector was 71, of which 49 were in agriculture, 17 were in forestry or lumber production and 5 were in fishing or fisheries. The number of jobs in the secondary sector was 5,141 of which 4,944 or (96.2%) were in manufacturing, 1 was in mining and 150 (2.9%) were in construction. The number of jobs in the tertiary sector was 1,948. In the tertiary sector; 591 or 30.3% were in wholesale or retail sales or the repair of motor vehicles, 79 or 4.1% were in the movement and storage of goods, 128 or 6.6% were in a hotel or restaurant, 13 or 0.7% were in the information industry, 58 or 3.0% were the insurance or financial industry, 94 or 4.8% were technical professionals or scientists, 349 or 17.9% were in education and 409 or 21.0% were in health care.

In 2000, there were 4,232 workers who commuted into the municipality and 1,877 workers who commuted away. The municipality is a net importer of workers, with about 2.3 workers entering the municipality for every one leaving. About 26.2% of the workforce coming into Le Locle are coming from outside Switzerland, while 0.2% of the locals commute out of Switzerland for work. Of the working population, 13.7% used public transportation to get to work, and 59.6% used a private car.

== Religion ==
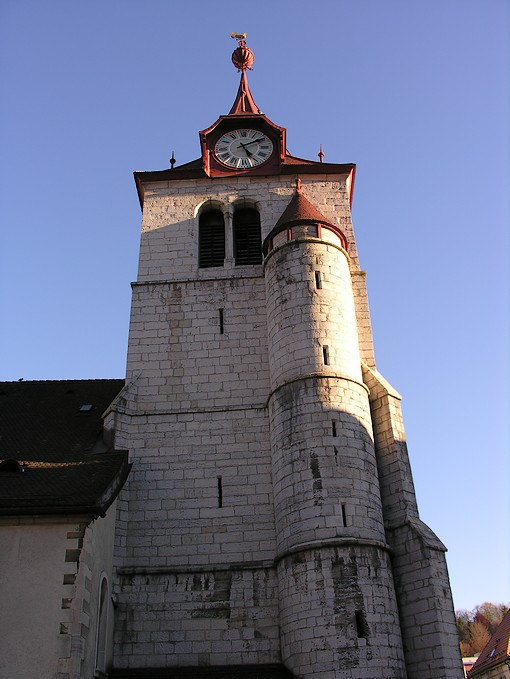
Protestant church in Le Locle

From the 2000 census, 3,582 or 34.0% were Roman Catholic, while 3,140 or 29.8% belonged to the Swiss Reformed Church. Of the rest of the population, there were 56 members of an Orthodox church (or about 0.53% of the population), there were 27 individuals (or about 0.26% of the population) who belonged to the Christian Catholic Church, and there were 677 individuals (or about 6.43% of the population) who belonged to another Christian church. There were 329 (or about 3.12% of the population) who were Islamic. There were 27 individuals who were Buddhist, 1 person who was Hindu and 8 individuals who belonged to another church. 2,415 (or about 22.94% of the population) belonged to no church, are agnostic or atheist, and 599 individuals (or about 5.69% of the population) did not answer the question.

== Education ==
In Le Locle about 3,445 or (32.7%) of the population have completed non-mandatory upper secondary education, and 1,035 or (9.8%) have completed additional higher education (either university or a Fachhochschule). Of the 1,035 who completed tertiary schooling, 55.7% were Swiss men, 22.1% were Swiss women, 15.6% were non-Swiss men and 6.7% were non-Swiss women.

In the canton of Neuchâtel most municipalities provide two years of non-mandatory kindergarten, followed by five years of mandatory primary education. The next four years of mandatory secondary education is provided at thirteen larger secondary schools, which many students travel out of their home municipality to attend. During the 2010–11 school year, there were 10 kindergarten classes with a total of 185 students in Le Locle. In the same year, there were 31 primary classes with a total of 564 students.

As of 2000, there were 622 students in Le Locle who came from another municipality, while 250 residents attended schools outside the municipality.

Le Locle is home to the Bibliothèque de la Ville Le Locle library.

== Transportation ==
Le Locle has several railway stations; the primary one is Le Locle, on the Neuchâtel–Le Locle-Col-des-Roches line, with frequent service to La Chaux-de-Fonds and Neuchâtel.

Le Remontoir is an inclined elevator between Le Locle railway station and the city centre.

== International relations ==
Le Locle is twinned with:

Gérardmer, France	Sidmouth, Devon, England

== Notable people ==
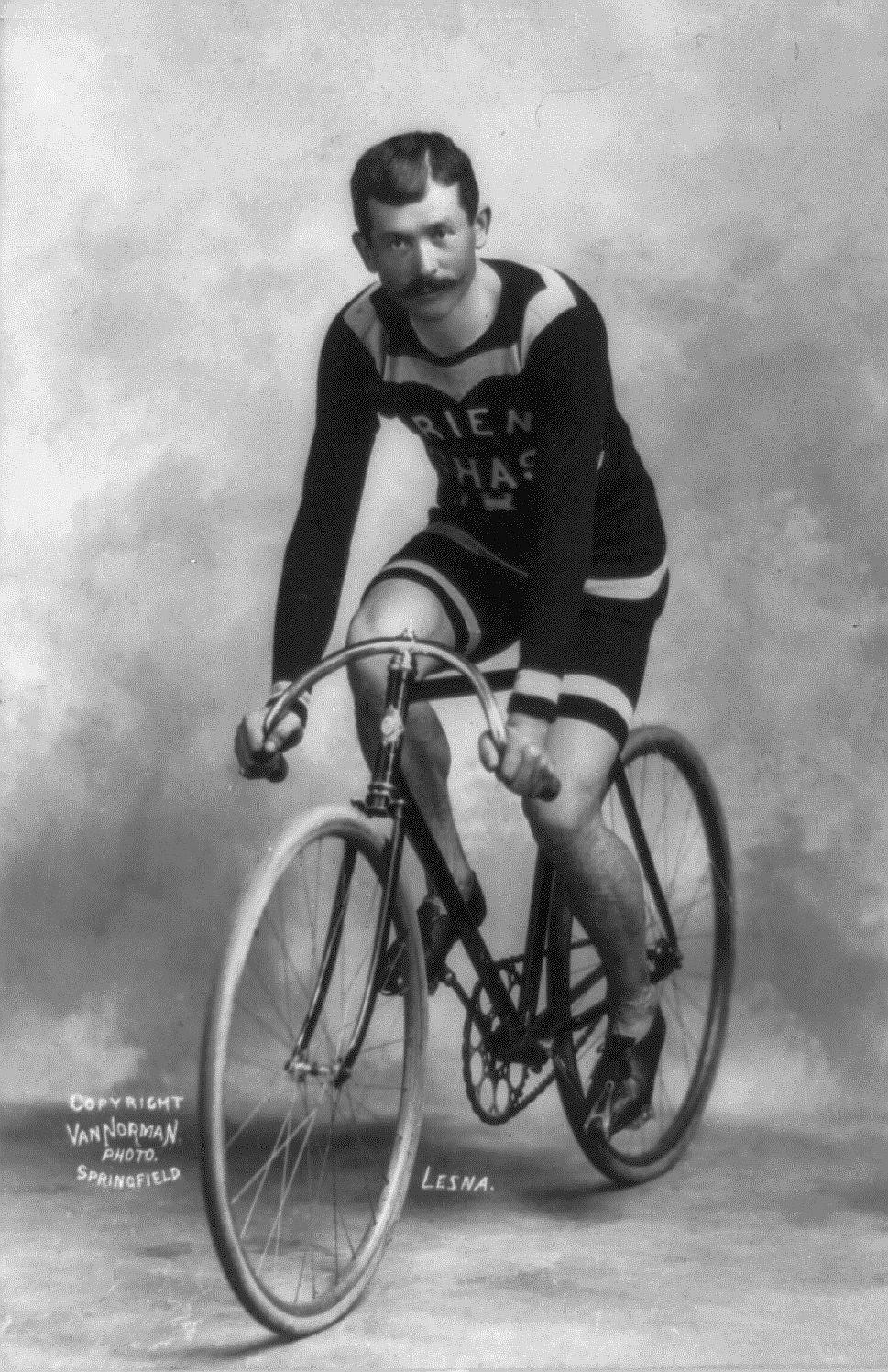
Lucien Lesna, ca. 1898

- Charles Girardet (1813 in Le Locle – 1871) a painter and illustrator
- Charles-Alexandre Steinhäuslin (1827 in Le Locle – 1890) a Swiss artist, soldier, businessman and politician
- Charles B. Borel (1883 in Le Locle – 1960) an American horse racing jockey, won the 1917 Kentucky Derby
- Lucien Lesna (1863 in Le Locle – 1932) cyclist, won the 1901 and 1902 Paris–Roubaix races
- Oscar Tschirky (1866–1950) Maître d'hôtel at Hotel Waldorf Astoria New York
- Paul Konrad (1877 in Le Locle – 1948) a Swiss geometrician and amateur mycologist
- Henri Rheinwald (1884 in Le Locle – 1968) cyclist
- Pierre Favre (born 1937 in Le Locle) jazz drummer
- André Jeanquartier (born 1941 in Le Locle) a Swiss jazz pianist
- Francis Matthey (born 1942 in Le Locle) Swiss politician
- Bernard Challandes (born 1951 in Le Locle) soccer coach
- Sébastien Jeanneret (born 1973 in Le Locle) a former Swiss football player, nearly 300 club caps and 18 for Switzerland
