= Watch Museum of Le Locle =

Museum in Le Locle, Switzerland

Coordinates: 47.0636°N 6.7499°E

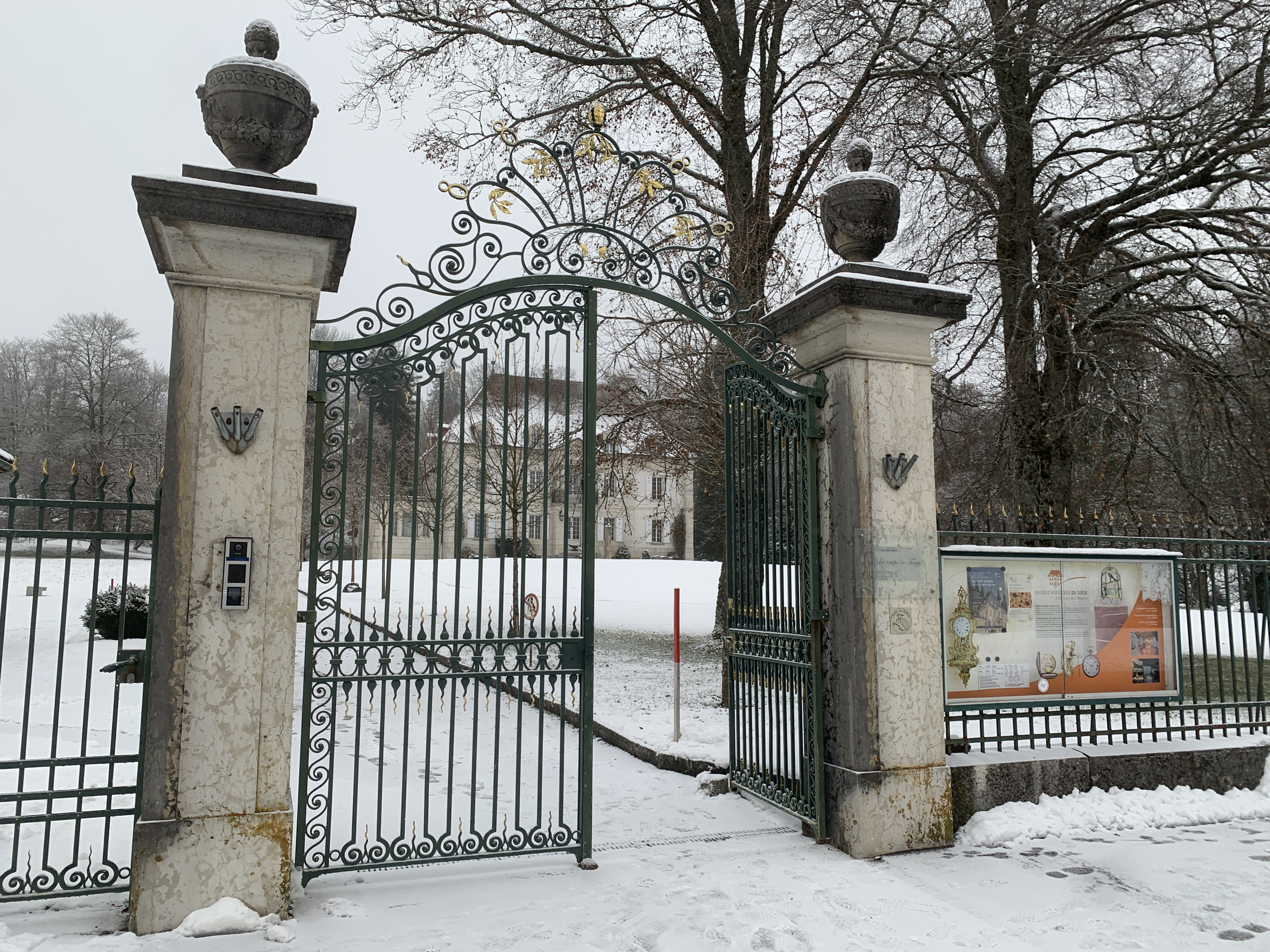
Watch Museum of Le Locle: view through the main gate

The Watch Museum of Le Locle (French: Musée d'Horlogerie du Locle) is a municipal museum specializing in horology, located in Le Locle, Canton of Neuchâtel, Switzerland. It is open to the public.

The museum is located in Château des Monts, a small historic country manor house about one kilometer north of the city center, on a hill.

Most visitors combine a visit to this museum with the other world-class horological museum in the region the Musée international d'horlogerie in La Chaux-de-Fonds, a few kilometers further east.

== Collection ==
One of the French-made wall pendule clocks on display on the second floor of the Musée d'Horlogerie du Locle, Château des Monts

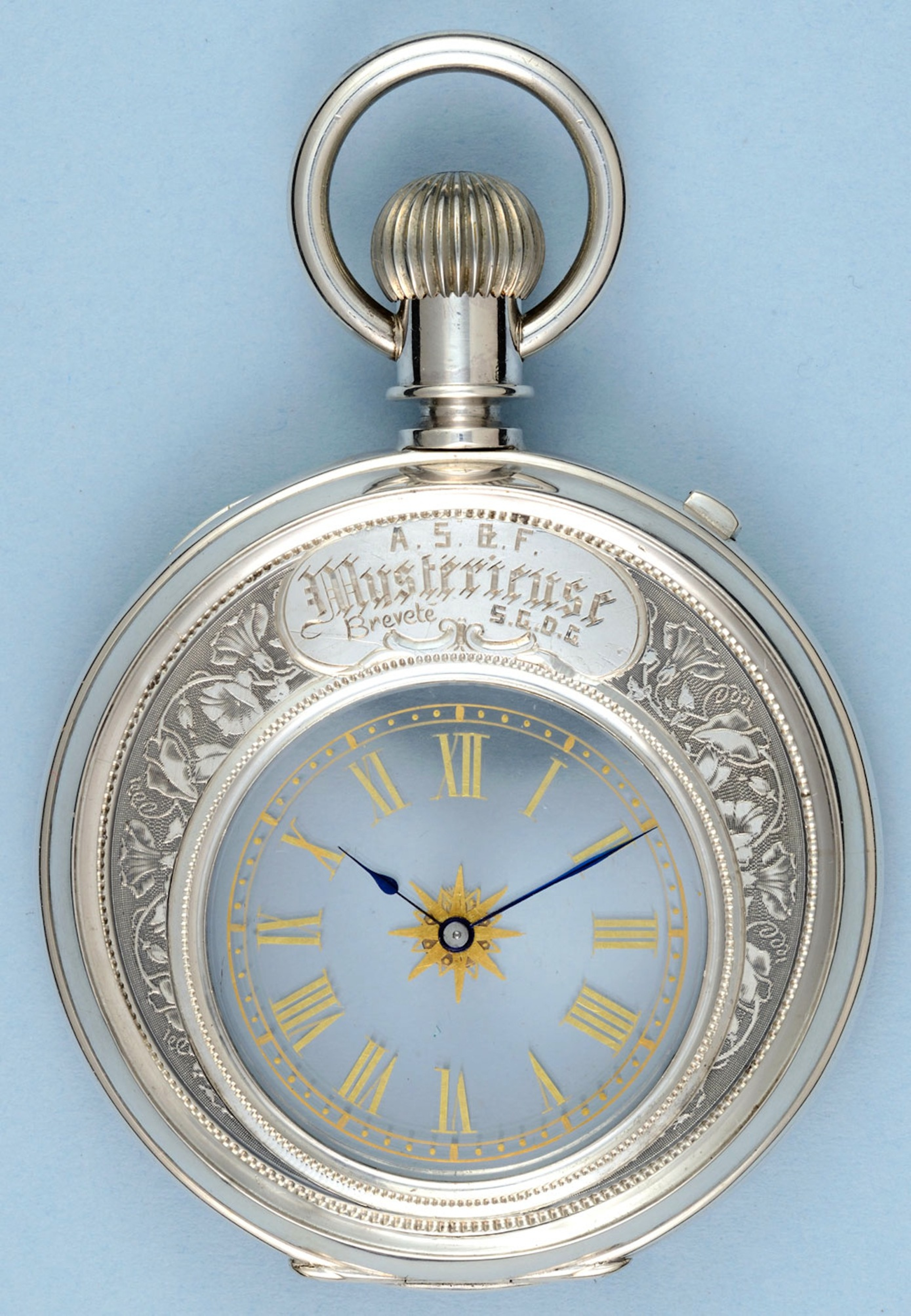
A so-called mystery watch, circa 1889, with a specimen of morning glory engraved in the dust cover by using the tapisserie technique.

The core of the museum collection is made up of several important legacies:

- The Collection Maurice Yves Sandoz; the collection is particularly rich in Swiss-made automatons from the 18th and 19th century, many including mechanical music or singing bird automatons.
- The Collection Henri Jeanmaire; the strength of this collection is the marquetry clock cases by Charles André Boulle in the Louis XIV era.
- The Collection Alfred Huguenin, focusing on the history of the Neuchâtel style pendule.

In these three specialized areas of horological history, several of the exhibited pieces are among the best specimens globally that are on display to the public.

On the ground floor there also is a highly concentrated comprehensive technical history of the watch movement.

The museum features also a small auditorium where a video presentation allows visitors to witness the exhibited automatons in action.

The park-like garden features several sundials and larger, sculptural clocks, including a replica of the Elephant clock of al-Jazari.

At most times there is at least one additional temporary exhibition on a horological theme.

The museum has an excellent horological library, incorporating the research archives of the Swiss horological scholar and historian Alfred Chapuis, and the former library of the French horological author Tardy. The library is open for horological scholars by appointment only.

== Events ==
A biannual chronometry competition has been organized by the museum since 2009.

== See also ==
- Horology
- List of museums in Switzerland
