= La Chaux-de-Fonds District =

Coordinates: 47°06′05″N 6°49′30″E

La Chaux-de-Fonds District District de la Chaux-de-Fonds
- District
- Country: Switzerland
- Canton: Neuchâtel
- Capital: La Chaux-de-Fonds
- Dissolved: 1 January 2018

Area
  - Total: 92.94 km^{2} (35.88 sq mi)

Population (2017)
  - Total: 39,796
  - Density: 428.2/km^{2} (1,109/sq mi)
- Time zone: UTC+1 (CET)
  - Summer (DST): UTC+2 (CEST)
- Municipalities: 3

La Chaux-de-Fonds District was one of the six districts of the canton of Neuchâtel, Switzerland, until the district level was eliminated on 1 January 2018. The district capital was the town of La Chaux-de-Fonds. It had a population of 39,796.

== Municipalities ==
La Chaux-de-Fonds contains three municipalities:

Flag	Coat of arms	Municipality	Population (31 December 2020)	Area km^{2}
La Chaux-de-Fonds	La Chaux-de-Fonds	La Chaux-de-Fonds	36,915	55.66
La Sagne	La Sagne	La Sagne	1,058	25.55
Les Planchettes	Les Planchettes	Les Planchettes	210	11.73
		Total	39,796	92.94

== Demographics ==
La Chaux-de-Fonds district had a population (as of 2017) of 39,796.

Most of the population (as of 2000) speaks French (32,804 or 85.8%) as their first language, Italian is the second most common (1,344 or 3.5%) and Portuguese is the third (1,175 or 3.1%). There are 945 people who speak German and 32 people who speak Romansh.

As of 2008, the population was 48.1% male and 51.9% female. The population was made up of 12,983 Swiss men (33.5% of the population) and 5,616 (14.5%) non-Swiss men. There were 15,077 Swiss women (39.0%) and 5,025 (13.0%) non-Swiss women.

Of the population in the district, 15,595 or about 40.8% were born in La Chaux-de-Fonds and lived there in 2000. There were 4,229 or 11.1% who were born in the same canton, while 7,172 or 18.8% were born somewhere else in Switzerland, and 9,747 or 25.5% were born outside of Switzerland.

As of 2000, there were 14,871 people who were single and never married in the district. There were 17,843 married individuals, 2,700 widows or widowers and 2,824 individuals who are divorced.

There were 7,211 households that consist of only one person and 786 households with five or more people.

The historical population is given in the following chart:

== Politics ==
In the 2007 federal election the most popular party was the SP which received 27.76% of the vote. The next three most popular parties were the SVP (25.93%), the PdA Party (13.98%) and the Green Party (11.92%). In the federal election, a total of 10,791 votes were cast, and the voter turnout was 47.3%.

== Religion ==
From the 2000 census, 11,545 or 30.2% were Roman Catholic, while 10,955 or 28.6% belonged to the Swiss Reformed Church. Of the rest of the population, there were 207 members of an Orthodox church (or about 0.54% of the population), there were 302 individuals (or about 0.79% of the population) who belonged to the Christian Catholic Church, and there were 2,418 individuals (or about 6.32% of the population) who belonged to another Christian church. There were 132 individuals (or about 0.35% of the population) who were Jewish, and 1,372 (or about 3.59% of the population) who were Islamic. There were 91 individuals who were Buddhist, 83 individuals who were Hindu and 47 individuals who belonged to another church. 10,265 (or about 26.85% of the population) belonged to no church, are agnostic or atheist, and 2,014 individuals (or about 5.27% of the population) did not answer the question.

== Education ==
In La Chaux-de-Fonds about 12,764 or (33.4%) of the population have completed non-mandatory upper secondary education, and 4,056 or (10.6%) have completed additional higher education (either university or a Fachhochschule). Of the 4,056 who completed tertiary schooling, 52.0% were Swiss men, 28.5% were Swiss women, 11.8% were non-Swiss men and 7.7% were non-Swiss women.

In the canton of Neuchâtel most municipalities provide two years of non-mandatory kindergarten, followed by five years of mandatory primary education. The next four years of mandatory secondary education is provided at thirteen larger secondary schools, which many students travel out of their home municipality to attend. During the 2010-11 school year, there were 40 kindergarten classes with a total of 762 students in District de la Chaux-de-Fonds. In the same year, there were 116 primary classes with a total of 2,102 students.
