= Charles-Alexandre Steinhäuslin =

Swiss artist, soldier, politician (1827–1890)

Charles-Alexandre Steinhäuslin (4 April 1827 – 17 August 1890) was a Swiss artist, soldier, businessman and politician.

Born in Le Locle as a pastor's son, he was educated in Bern and, after discovering his artistic talent, began attending the Städelschule in Frankfurt am Main in October 1846.

With the outbreak of the Sonderbund War in autumn 1847, Steinhäuslin was recalled to Switzerland. He served as a lieutenant in a Bernese unit on the Federal side (the 19th battalion, 2nd brigade, II. Division), which participated in the campaigns against Fribourg and Lucerne without having to engage in combat. In the field, he made a number of ink drawings illustrating the actions of his unit as well as of the major engagements of the war, based on the testimony of fellow soldiers. After the war, he continued to pursue his military career, rising to the grade of lieutenant-colonel commanding a brigade in the army mobilization of 1870. Promoted to colonel three years later, his health prevented him from assuming command of a division.

In civilian life, Steinhäuslin lived and worked in Bern as inspector general of the Société d'assurance mobilière for the French-speaking part of Switzerland. He was elected to the city council and to the Grand Council of Bern, where he sat with the Conservatives. It can be inferred from the obituaries following his death in 1890 that he must have been a most engaging personality.

== Works ==
- Steinhäuslin, Charles Alexandre (1848). Bilder aus dem Sonderbundskriege im November 1847. Zürich: Schulthess.
