= Cryptobatrachus fuhrmanni =

Conservation status
- Least Concern (IUCN 3.1)

Scientific classification
- Kingdom: Animalia
- Phylum: Chordata
- Class: Amphibia
- Order: Anura
- Family: Hemiphractidae
- Genus: Cryptobatrachus
- Species: C. fuhrmanni

Binomial name
- Cryptobatrachus fuhrmanni (Peracca, 1914)

Synonyms
- Hyla fuhrmanni Peracca, 1914; Hyloscirtus fuhrmanni — Noble, 1917; Cryptobatrachus incertus Barbour, 1926

Species of amphibian

Cryptobatrachus fuhrmanni commonly known as Fuhrmann's backpack frog is a species of frog belonging to the family Hemiphractidae. It is endemic to Colombia and occurs on all three Andean cordilleras: the eastern slope of the Cordillera Occidental, the northern and eastern flanks of the Cordillera Central, and the western slope of the Cordillera Oriental. The specific name fuhrmanni is in honor of Otto Fuhrmann, a Swiss zoologist and helminthologist.

== Description ==
Adult males measure 28–52 mm (1.1–2.0 in) and adult females 51–73 mm (2.0–2.9 in) in snout–vent length. The snout is short and the tympanum is small, showing no sexual dimorphism. The dorsolateral folds are thin, and the skin on the dorsum is finely granular with scattered larger warts. The fingers lack webbing but expanded disks at the tips with subarticular adhesive pads present.

Female frogs carry eggs on their backs, which undergo direct development, hatching as froglets (i.e., there is no free-living larval stage).

== Habitat and conservation ==
Cryptobatrachus fuhrmanni is a common species of frog found on rocks in fast-flowing mountain streams within transition and montane forest at elevations ranging from 380–2,050 m (1,250–6,730 ft) above sea level. While habitat loss due to agriculture and logging poses a threat to this species, it has shown tolerance for some habitat perturbation. Notably, it is found in the Reserva Regional Bosque de Florencia in Caldas.
