= Paul Cruchet =

Swiss mycologist

Paul Cruchet (25 September 1875, Montpreveyres – 31 March 1964, Morges) was a Swiss mycologist who specialized in parasitic fungi. His scientific work contributed to the study and knowledge of Swiss and general mycological flora, particularly in the field of parasitic microfungi of plants.

== Biography ==
Paul Cruchet was born in Montpreveyres, Vaud, Switzerland, where his father, Denis Cruchet (1847–1926), served as a pastor. Denis Cruchet was also a notable scientist, recognized as a modest yet distinguished mycologist known in Switzerland and beyond its national borders.

Cruchet completed his university studies at the University of Lausanne, obtaining his doctorate in sciences in 1906. He began his career as a professor at the college in Payerne in 1906. In 1922, he was appointed professor at the college in Morges, where he remained until his retirement in 1935. He lived in Morges until his death on 31 March 1964, at the age of 89.

== Scientific work ==
Under the influence of his father, Paul Cruchet developed an interest in botany, specifically mycology and the study of parasitic microfungi of plants. Throughout his career, he conducted field research, often in collaboration with colleague Eugène Mayor of Neuchâtel. Their scientific excursions covered the Jura Mountains, the Alps (particularly in Valais), Ticino, and southern France.

Cruchet was known for his scientific precision and thoroughness in his field work. His colleague Mayor noted that "nothing escaped him, and one can say without exaggeration that there remained nothing to find after his passage at any location". His meticulous microscopic examinations of parasitic fungi often involved preparing microscopic sections, and his completed studies were considered definitive.

Throughout his scientific career, Paul Cruchet published numerous scientific papers in various journals, including the Bulletin of La Murithienne. He described and provided detailed studies of nine parasitic fungi new to science, contributing significantly to mycological taxonomy. Beginning in 1898, he accumulated extensive research materials that were carefully preserved in his herbarium. He also inherited his father's equally rich collections, and following Paul's wishes, both of these important herbaria were deposited at the Botanical Institute of the University of Lausanne, where they remain available for consultation by specialists in the field.

== Professional affiliations ==
Cruchet was a member of several scientific societies:

- A member of La Murithienne (the Valais Society of Natural Sciences) since 1902
- An active member of the Société Vaudoise des Sciences Naturelles, serving as its president from 1924 to 1925, and being named an emeritus member in June 1963
- Member of the Swiss Society of Natural Sciences (Société helvétique des sciences naturelles)
- Member of the Swiss Botanical Society

== Character and legacy ==
Beyond his scientific pursuits, Cruchet was known for his intellectual openness and moral qualities. Described as exceptionally modest and humble like his father, he often hesitated to share his research findings and sometimes needed encouragement from colleagues to publish his studies. Eugène Mayor, who wrote his obituary, emphasized that Cruchet "was all humility and modesty, but throughout his life he thought only of doing good, always seeking to bring peace". His family life was considered exemplary, and those who had the privilege of entering his intimate circle acknowledged the significant impact he had on their lives.

The herbarium collections of both Paul Cruchet and his father Denis constitute an important scientific legacy, now housed at the Botanical Institute of the University of Lausanne, where they remain available for consultation by specialists.

== Selected publications ==
- Cruchet, P. (1908). "Note sur deux nouveaux parasites du Polygonum alpinum L.". Bulletin de l'Herbier Boissier. 2 (in French). 7: 245–247.
- Cruchet, D.; Mayor, E.; Cruchet, P. (1911). "Contribution à l'étude de la flore cryptogamique du Canton du Valais". Bulletin de la Murithiènne (in French). 37: 94–99.
- Cruchet, P. (1913). "Contribution à l'étude des uredinées". Mykologisches Zentralblatt (in French). 3: 209–214.
- Cruchet, P. (1916). "Deux urédinées nouvelles". Bulletin de la Société Vaudoise de Sciences Naturelles (in French). 51: 73–79.
- Cruchet, P. (1921). "Herborisation mycologique à Montorge et au Sanetoch en août 1919". Bull. Murithiènne (in French). 41: 67–69.
