= Monts Castle =

Castle in Le Locle, Switzerland

Coordinates: 47°03′49″N 6°45′00″E

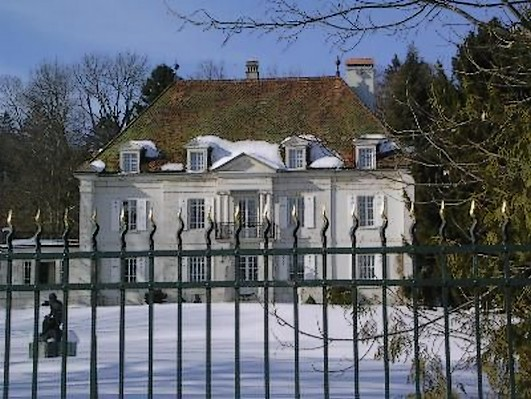
Monts Castle

Monts Castle is a castle in the municipality of Le Locle of the Canton of Neuchâtel in Switzerland. It is a Swiss heritage site of national significance.

== See also ==
- List of castles in Switzerland
- Château
