= Les Planchettes =

- Municipality
- Flag Coat of arms
- Location of Les Planchettes
- Location within Switzerland Location within Canton of Neuchâtel
- Coordinates: 47°7′N 6°46′E
- Country: Switzerland
- Canton: Neuchâtel

Area
  - Total: 11.73 km^{2} (4.53 sq mi)
- Elevation: 1,063 m (3,488 ft)

Population (December 2007)
  - Total: 227
  - Density: 19.4/km^{2} (50.1/sq mi)
- Time zone: UTC+01:00 (CET)
  - Summer (DST): UTC+02:00 (CEST)
- Postal code: 2325
- SFOS number: 6422
- ISO 3166 code: CH-NE
- Surrounded by: Grand'Combe-des-Bois (France), La Chaux-de-Fonds, Le Locle, Villers-le-Lac (France)
- Twin towns: Bardouville (France)
- Website: www.les-planchettes.ch

Les Planchettes (French pronunciation: [le plɑ̃ʃɛt]) is a municipality in the canton of Neuchâtel in Switzerland.

== History ==
Les Planchettes is first mentioned in 1455 as Les Planchotes.

== Geography ==
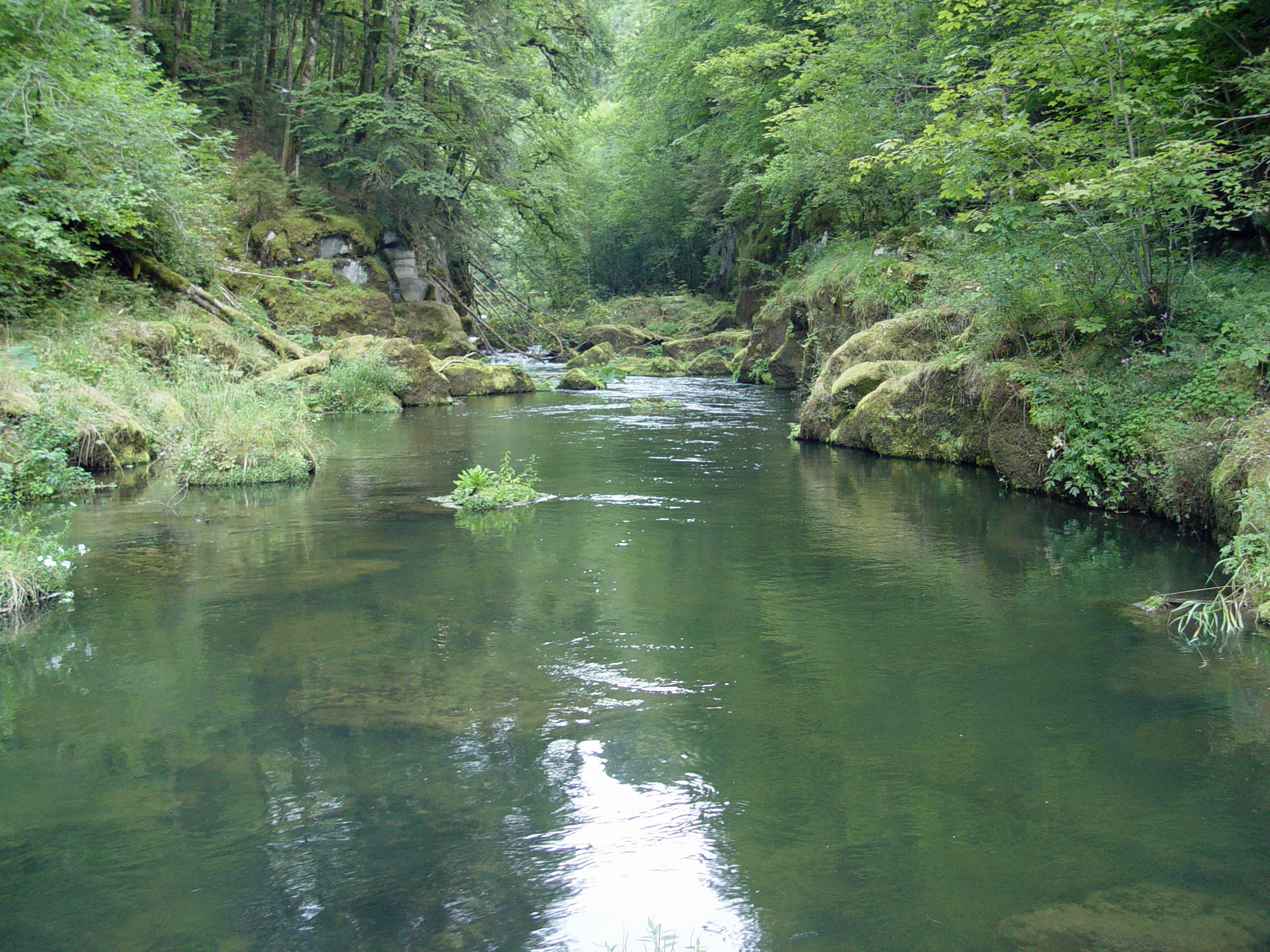
Doubs river near Les Planchettes village

Aerial view (1955)

Les Planchettes has an area, as of 2009, of 11.7 square kilometers (4.5 mi^{2}). Of this area, 4.39 km^{2} (1.69 mi^{2}) or 37.4% is used for agricultural purposes, while 6.66 km^{2} (2.57 mi^{2}) or 56.8% is forested. Of the rest of the land, 0.35 km^{2} (0.14 mi^{2}) or 3.0% is settled (buildings or roads), 0.3 km^{2} (0.12 mi^{2}) or 2.6% is either rivers or lakes and 0.02 km^{2} (4.9 acres) or 0.2% is unproductive land.

Of the built up area, housing and buildings made up 1.5% and transportation infrastructure made up 1.1%. Of the forested land, 52.3% of the total land area is heavily forested and 4.4% is covered with orchards or small clusters of trees. Of the agricultural land, 0.3% is used for growing crops, 22.6% is pastures and 14.6% is used for alpine pastures. Of the water in the municipality, 1.8% is in lakes and 0.8% is in rivers and streams.

The municipality is located north of La Chaux-de-Fonds. The municipality stretches from the Doubs river to the northern slope of the Pouillerel. It was located in the district of La Chaux-de-Fonds, until the district level was eliminated on 1 January 2018.

== Coat of arms ==
The blazon of the municipal coat of arms is Chevron raised Argent, and Argent an inscription 1812 Sable. 1812 refers to the foundation of the municipality.

== Demographics ==
Les Planchettes has a population (as of December 2020) of 210. As of 2008, 6.4% of the population are resident foreign nationals. Over the last 10 years (2000–2010) the population has changed at a rate of 0.4%. It has changed at a rate of -8.7% due to migration and at a rate of 9.1% due to births and deaths.

Most of the population (as of 2000) speaks French (205 or 91.1%) as their first language, German is the second most common (16 or 7.1%) and Dutch is the third (2 or 0.9%). There is 1 person who speaks Italian.

As of 2008, the population was 48.9% male and 51.1% female. The population was made up of 100 Swiss men (45.2% of the population) and 8 (3.6%) non-Swiss men. There were 109 Swiss women (49.3%) and 4 (1.8%) non-Swiss women. Of the population in the municipality, 71 or about 31.6% were born in Les Planchettes and lived there in 2000. There were 89 or 39.6% who were born in the same canton, while 43 or 19.1% were born somewhere else in Switzerland, and 14 or 6.2% were born outside of Switzerland.

As of 2000, children and teenagers (0–19 years old) make up 34.7% of the population, while adults (20–64 years old) make up 56% and seniors (over 64 years old) make up 9.3%.

As of 2000, there were 105 people who were single and never married in the municipality. There were 105 married individuals, 9 widows or widowers and 6 individuals who are divorced.

As of 2000, there were 72 private households in the municipality, and an average of 2.8 persons per household. There were 16 households that consist of only one person and 11 households with five or more people. In 2000, a total of 72 apartments (63.2% of the total) were permanently occupied, while 37 apartments (32.5%) were seasonally occupied and 5 apartments (4.4%) were empty.

The historical population is given in the following chart:

== Politics ==
In the 2007 federal election the most popular party was the SVP which received 31.06% of the vote. The next three most popular parties were the SP (20.96%), the Green Party (12.63%) and the PdA Party (12.12%). In the federal election, a total of 83 votes were cast, and the voter turnout was 50.9%.

== Economy ==
As of 2010, Les Planchettes had an unemployment rate of 6.5%. As of 2008, there were 27 people employed in the primary economic sector and about 14 businesses involved in this sector. 10 people were employed in the secondary sector and there was 1 business in this sector. 12 people were employed in the tertiary sector, with 3 businesses in this sector. There were 108 residents of the municipality who were employed in some capacity, of which females made up 38.0% of the workforce.

In 2008 the total number of full-time equivalent jobs was 39. The number of jobs in the primary sector was 20, all of which were in agriculture. The number of jobs in the secondary sector was 10, all in construction. The number of jobs in the tertiary sector was 9. In the tertiary sector; 6 or 66.7% were in a hotel or restaurant.

In 2000, there were 10 workers who commuted into the municipality and 62 workers who commuted away. The municipality is a net exporter of workers, with about 6.2 workers leaving the municipality for every one entering. Of the working population, 6.5% used public transportation to get to work, and 51.9% used a private car.

== Religion ==
From the 2000 census, 48 or 21.3% were Roman Catholic, while 114 or 50.7% belonged to the Swiss Reformed Church. Of the rest of the population, there were 6 individuals (or about 2.67% of the population) who belonged to another Christian church. There was 1 individual who was Islamic. 44 (or about 19.56% of the population) belonged to no church, are agnostic or atheist, and 15 individuals (or about 6.67% of the population) did not answer the question.

== Education ==
In Les Planchettes about 75 or (33.3%) of the population have completed non-mandatory upper secondary education, and 16 or (7.1%) have completed additional higher education (either university or a Fachhochschule). Of the 16 who completed tertiary schooling, 68.8% were Swiss men, 18.8% were Swiss women.

In the canton of Neuchâtel most municipalities provide two years of non-mandatory kindergarten, followed by five years of mandatory primary education. The next four years of mandatory secondary education is provided at thirteen larger secondary schools, which many students travel out of their home municipality to attend. The primary school in Les Planchettes is combined with La Chaux-de-Fonds. During the 2010–11 school year, there were 0.5 kindergarten classes with a total of 7 students in Les Planchettes. In the same year, there were 113 primary classes with a total of 2,042 students.

As of 2000, there were 26 students from Les Planchettes who attended schools outside the municipality.
