= La Sagne =

- Municipality
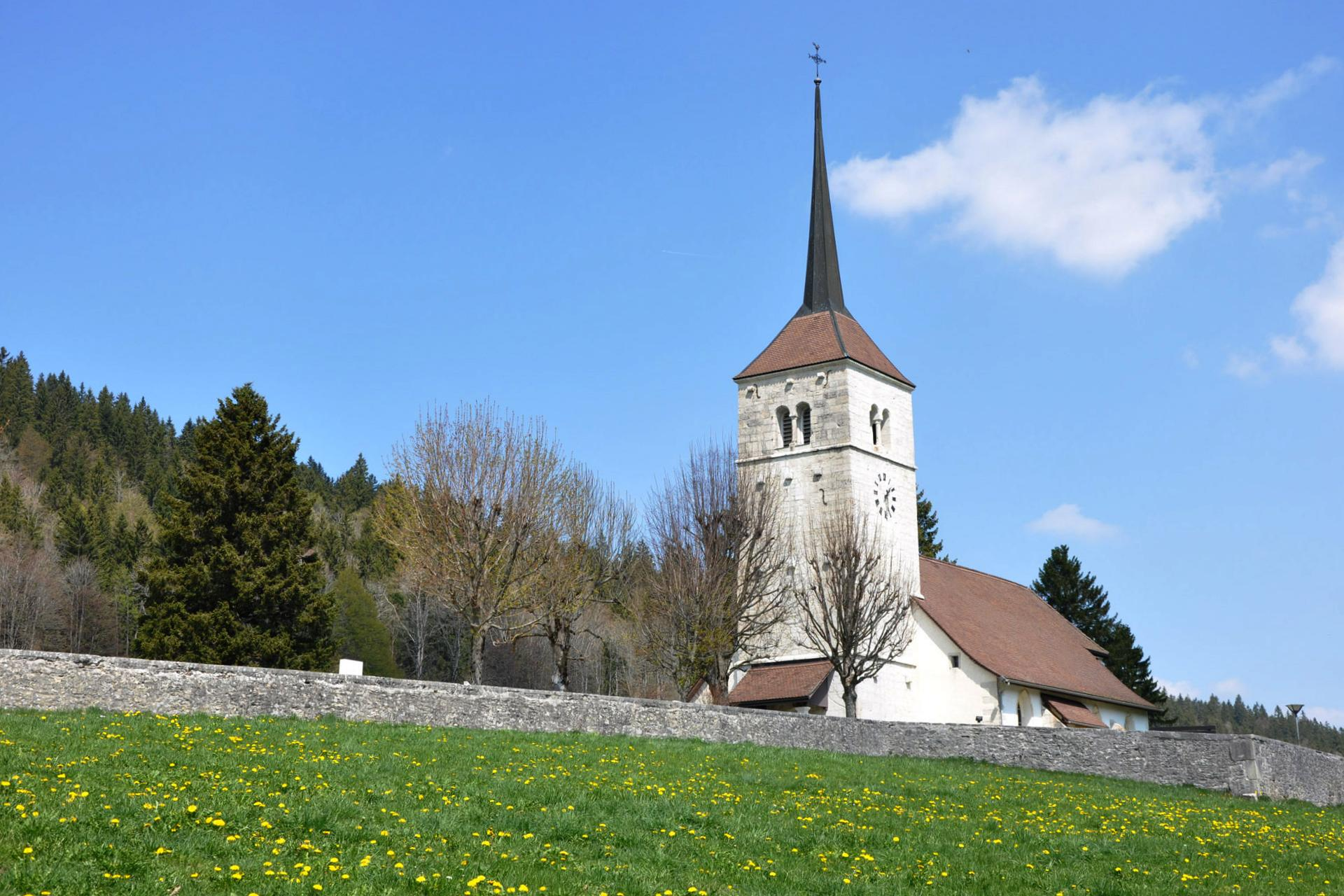
- La Sagne village church

- Flag Coat of arms
- Location of La Sagne
- Location within Switzerland Location within Canton of Neuchâtel
- Coordinates: 47°2′N 6°48′E
- Country: Switzerland
- Canton: Neuchâtel

Area
  - Total: 25.55 km^{2} (9.86 sq mi)
- Elevation: 1,039 m (3,409 ft)

Population (December 2007)
  - Total: 968
  - Density: 37.9/km^{2} (98.1/sq mi)
- Time zone: UTC+01:00 (CET)
  - Summer (DST): UTC+02:00 (CEST)
- Postal code: 2314
- SFOS number: 6423
- ISO 3166 code: CH-NE
- Surrounded by: Boudevilliers, Brot-Plamboz, Coffrane, Fontaines, La Chaux-de-Fonds, Le Locle, Les Geneveys-sur-Coffrane, Les Hauts-Geneveys, Les Ponts-de-Martel, Montmollin, Rochefort
- Twin towns: Rosières-aux-Salines (France)
- Website: http://www.lasagne.ch

La Sagne (French pronunciation: [la saɲ]) is a municipality in the canton of Neuchâtel in Switzerland.

== History ==
La Sagne is first mentioned in 1332 as la Sagne.

== Geography ==
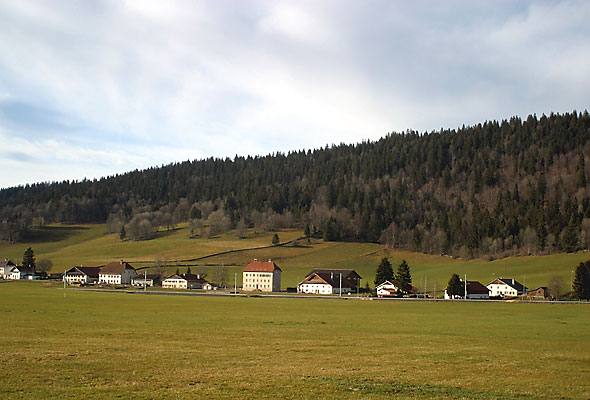
La Sagne village

Aerial view (1949)

La Sagne has an area, as of 2009, of 25.6 square kilometers (9.9 mi^{2}). Of this area, 15.29 km^{2} (5.90 mi^{2}) or 59.8% is used for agricultural purposes, while 9.45 km^{2} (3.65 mi^{2}) or 37.0% is forested. Of the rest of the land, 0.8 km^{2} (0.31 mi^{2}) or 3.1% is settled (buildings or roads), 0.04 km^{2} (9.9 acres) or 0.2% is either rivers or lakes and 0.02 km^{2} (4.9 acres) or 0.1% is unproductive land.

Of the built up area, housing and buildings made up 1.5% and transportation infrastructure made up 1.3%. Out of the forested land, 33.7% of the total land area is heavily forested and 3.3% is covered with orchards or small clusters of trees. Of the agricultural land, 0.5% is used for growing crops and 45.8% is pastures and 13.5% is used for alpine pastures. All the water in the municipality is flowing water.

The municipality was located in the district of La Chaux-de-Fonds until the district level was eliminated on 1 January 2018. It is in the eastern part of the Vallée de La Sagne et des Ponts-de-Martel and consists of the linear village of La Sagne and the hamlets of Les Cœudres, Le Crêt, Miéville, La Sagne-Eglise and La Corbatière.

== Coat of arms ==
The blazon of the municipal coat of arms is Argent, issuant from three Mounts Vert as many Pine trees of the same.

== Demographics ==
La Sagne has a population (as of December 2020) of 1,058. As of 2008, 6.0% of the population are resident foreign nationals. Over the last 10 years (2000–2010) the population has changed at a rate of 5.1%. It has changed at a rate of 7.6% due to migration and at a rate of 3.7% due to births and deaths.

Most of the population (as of 2000) speaks French (946 or 94.9%) as their first language, German is the second most common (29 or 2.9%) and Italian is the third (8 or 0.8%).

As of 2008, the population was 49.0% male and 51.0% female. The population was made up of 439 Swiss men (45.9% of the population) and 30 (3.1%) non-Swiss men. There were 455 Swiss women (47.5%) and 33 (3.4%) non-Swiss women. Of the population in the municipality, 360 or about 36.1% were born in La Sagne and lived there in 2000. There were 362 or 36.3% who were born in the same canton, while 167 or 16.8% were born somewhere else in Switzerland, and 82 or 8.2% were born outside of Switzerland.

As of 2000, children and teenagers (0–19 years old) make up 23.8% of the population, while adults (20–64 years old) make up 55.6% and seniors (over 64 years old) make up 20.7%.

As of 2000, there were 386 people who were single and never married in the municipality. There were 453 married individuals, 118 widows or widowers and 40 individuals who are divorced.

As of 2000, there were 374 private households in the municipality, and an average of 2.4 persons per household. There were 108 households that consist of only one person and 28 households with five or more people. In 2000, a total of 363 apartments (85.0% of the total) were permanently occupied, while 51 apartments (11.9%) were seasonally occupied and 13 apartments (3.0%) were empty. As of 2009, the construction rate of new housing units was 1 new units per 1000 residents. The vacancy rate for the municipality, in 2010, was 1.08%.

The historical population is given in the following chart:

== Heritage sites of national significance ==
The Double House and the Church are listed as Swiss heritage site of national significance. The entire village of La Sagne is part of the Inventory of Swiss Heritage Sites.

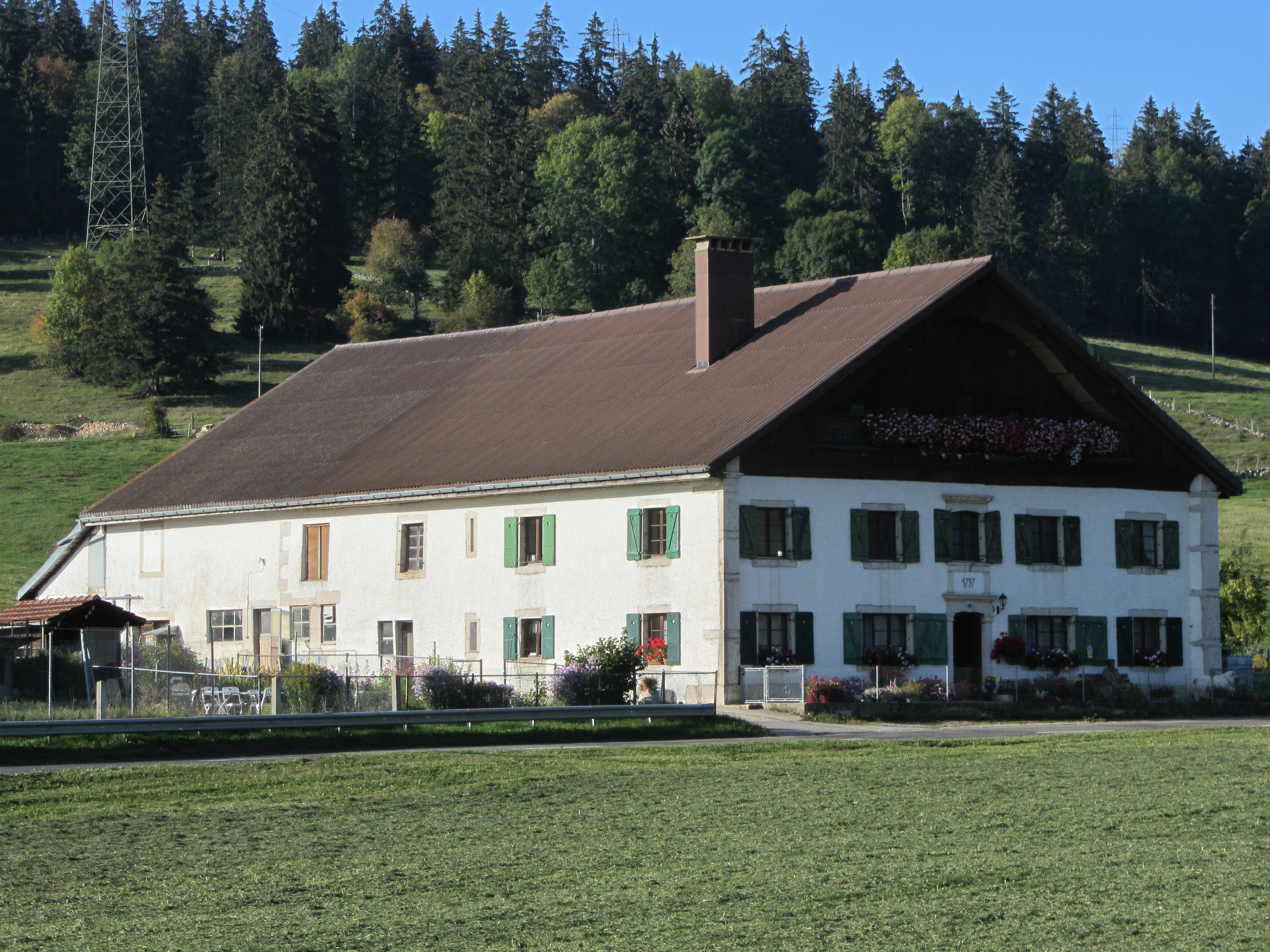
Double House

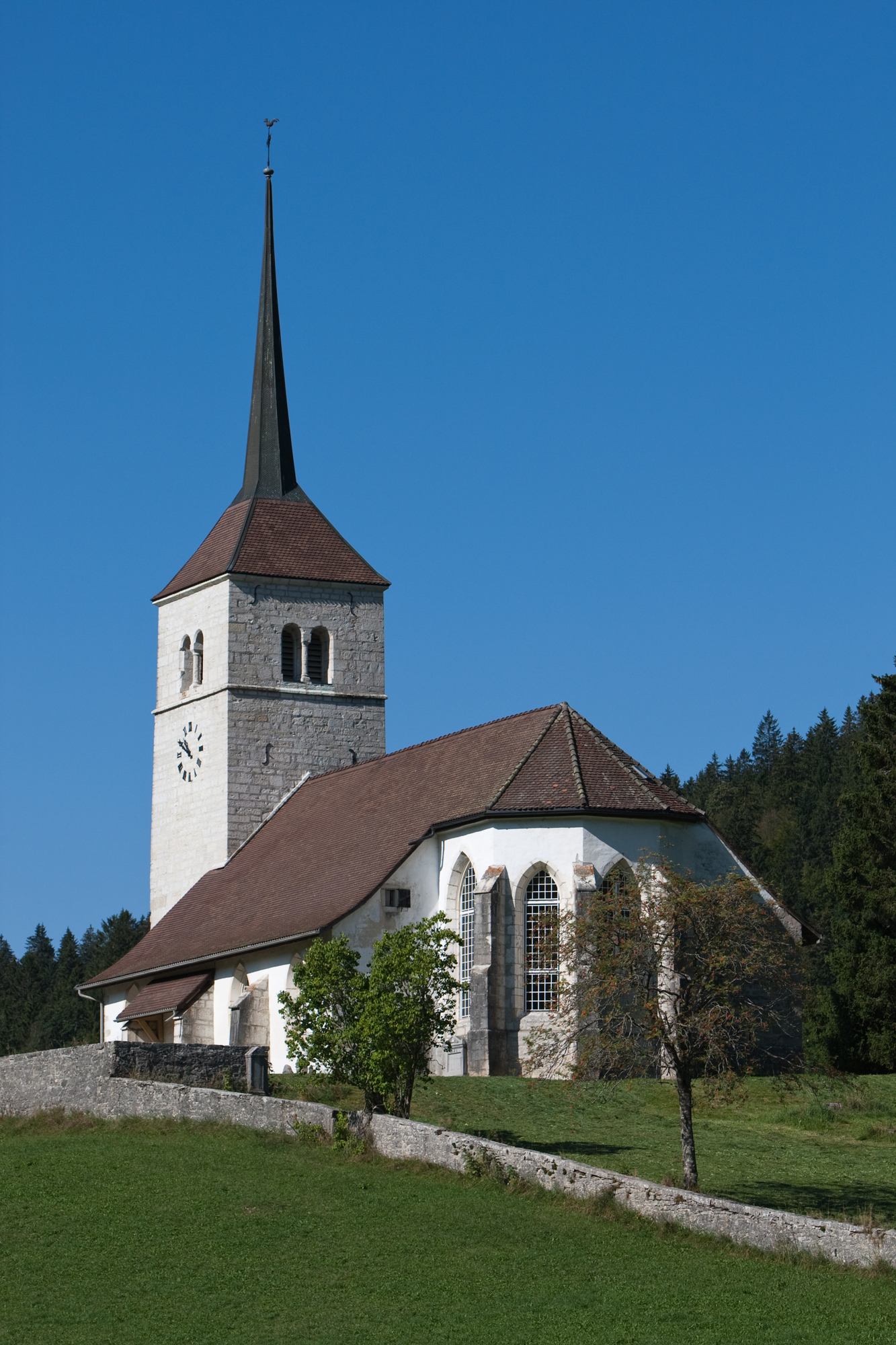
La Sagne-Eglise Church

== Politics ==
In the 2007 federal election the most popular party was the SVP which received 29.8% of the vote. The next three most popular parties were the SP (18.71%), the FDP (16.12%) and the LPS Party (13.48%). In the federal election, a total of 415 votes were cast, and the voter turnout was 51.6%.

== Economy ==
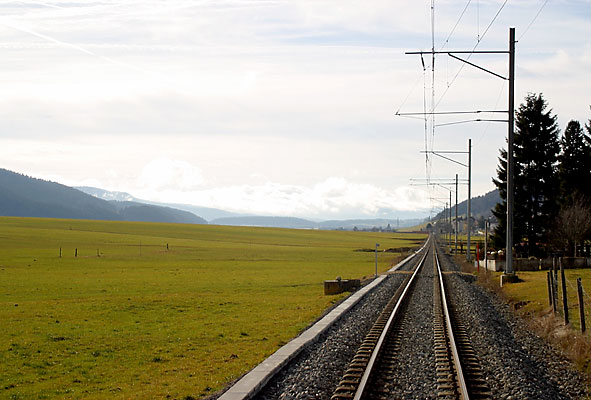
Rail line through Vallée des Pont near La Sagne

As of 2010, La Sagne had an unemployment rate of 2.6%. As of 2008, there were 89 people employed in the primary economic sector and about 40 businesses involved in this sector. 71 people were employed in the secondary sector and there were 15 businesses in this sector. 222 people were employed in the tertiary sector, with 30 businesses in this sector. There were 494 residents of the municipality who were employed in some capacity, of which females made up 43.3% of the workforce.

In 2008 the total number of full-time equivalent jobs was 314. The number of jobs in the primary sector was 69, of which 68 were in agriculture and 1 was in forestry or lumber production. The number of jobs in the secondary sector was 66 of which 43 or (65.2%) were in manufacturing and 23 (34.8%) were in construction. The number of jobs in the tertiary sector was 179. In the tertiary sector; 33 or 18.4% were in wholesale or retail sales or the repair of motor vehicles, 12 or 6.7% were in the movement and storage of goods, 16 or 8.9% were in a hotel or restaurant, 1 was in the information industry, 1 was the insurance or financial industry, 24 or 13.4% were technical professionals or scientists, 4 or 2.2% were in education and 82 or 45.8% were in health care.

In 2000, there were 167 workers who commuted into the municipality and 274 workers who commuted away. The municipality is a net exporter of workers, with about 1.6 workers leaving the municipality for every one entering. About 16.8% of the workforce coming into La Sagne are coming from outside Switzerland. Of the working population, 9.9% used public transportation to get to work, and 53.2% used a private car.

== Transportation ==
The municipality has five railway stations on the La Chaux-de-Fonds–Les Ponts-de-Martel line: La Corbatière, La Sagne-Eglise, La Sagne, Les Coeudres-Est, and Les Coeudres, providing hourly service to Les Ponts-de-Martel and La Chaux-de-Fonds.

== Religion ==
From the 2000 census, 177 or 17.8% were Roman Catholic, while 583 or 58.5% belonged to the Swiss Reformed Church. Of the rest of the population, there were 2 members of an Orthodox church (or about 0.20% of the population), there were 2 individuals (or about 0.20% of the population) who belonged to the Christian Catholic Church, and there were 47 individuals (or about 4.71% of the population) who belonged to another Christian church. There were 3 individuals (or about 0.30% of the population) who were Jewish, and 2 (or about 0.20% of the population) who were Islamic. There was 1 person who was Buddhist and 2 individuals who belonged to another church. 162 (or about 16.25% of the population) belonged to no church, are agnostic or atheist, and 39 individuals (or about 3.91% of the population) did not answer the question.

== Education ==
In La Sagne about 342 or (34.3%) of the population have completed non-mandatory upper secondary education, and 97 or (9.7%) have completed additional higher education (either university or a Fachhochschule). Of the 97 who completed tertiary schooling, 59.8% were Swiss men, 29.9% were Swiss women and 7.2% were non-Swiss women.

In the canton of Neuchâtel most municipalities provide two years of non-mandatory kindergarten, followed by five years of mandatory primary education. The next four years of mandatory secondary education is provided at thirteen larger secondary schools, which many students travel out of their home municipality to attend. During the 2010-11 school year, there were 1.5 kindergarten classes with a total of 27 students in La Sagne. In the same year, there were 3 primary classes with a total of 60 students.

As of 2000, there was one student in La Sagne who came from another municipality, while 88 residents attended schools outside the municipality.
