= Otto Fuhrmann =

Swiss parasitologist (1871–1945)

Otto Fuhrmann (1 April 1871 in Basel – 27 January 1945) was a Swiss parasitologist who specialized in the field of helminthology.

He studied at the University of Basel as a pupil of Ludwig Ruetimeyer and Friedrich Zschokke. He then continued his education at Geneva, where he was persuaded by zoologist Carl Vogt to focus his studies on parasitic flatworms. In 1894 he received his doctorate with the thesis "Die Turbellarien der Umgebung von Basel", and following a stint as an assistant at the University of Geneva, he relocated to the University of Neuchâtel, where from 1895 to 1941 he taught classes in comparative anatomy and zoology.

He is credited with introducing a new classification schema for Cyclophyllidea (order of tapeworms), in which the order was divided into ten families with eight subfamilies — of its 66 total genera, 20 were new to science. The frog Cryptobatrachus fuhrmanni (Fuhrmann's backpack frog) was named in his honor by Mario Giacinto Peracca.

== Selected works ==
- Die Cestoden der Vögel, 1909 – Avian cestodes.
- Voyage d'exploration scientifique en Colombie, 1914 (with Eugéne Mayor) – Voyage of exploration in Colombia.
- Cestodes d'oiseaux de la Nouvelle-Calédonie et des Iles Loyalty, 1918 – Avian cestodes of New Caledonia and the Loyalty Islands.
- Cestodes, 1926 – Cestoda.
- Brasilianische Cestoden aus Reptilien und Vögeln, 1927 – Brazilian cestodes of reptiles and birds.
- Les ténias des oiseaux, avec 147 figures dans le texte, 1932 – Tapeworms of birds.
