= Eugène Mayor =

Swiss mycologist (1877–1976)

Eugène Mayor (7 June 1877, Neuchâtel – 14 September 1976, Neuchâtel) was a Swiss physician and mycologist known for his research on parasitic microfungi. After graduating in medicine from Geneva in 1906, he gained international recognition through his 1910 scientific expedition to Colombia with Otto Fuhrmann, which resulted in the discovery of 126 new fungal species. He served as a physician at the cantonal hospice of Perreux-sur-Boudry from 1913 to 1942, after which he continued his mycological research at the University of Neuchâtel, ultimately publishing nearly 120 scientific works.

== Early life and career ==
Eugène Mayor was born in Neuchâtel, Switzerland. He studied medicine in Geneva, graduating in 1906, and initially developed an interest in natural sciences, particularly ornithology and later mycology. His introduction to microscopic fungi came through pastor Denis Cruchet. Throughout his life, he maintained an intense focus on parasitic microfungi, conducting detailed biological studies and experimental infections to accurately identify species.

In 1910, Mayor participated in a scientific expedition to Colombia with the parasitologist Otto Fuhrmann. The specimens collected during this trip were studied by various specialists, and in 1913 their work described 126 new fungal species, considerably enhancing Mayor's international reputation among mycologists. This work eventually led to the publication of Voyage d'exploration scientifique en Colombie, a description of their expedition. From 1913 to 1942 he served as a physician at the cantonal hospice of Perreux-sur-Boudry (Neuchâtel).

== Professional activities ==
From 1913 to 1942, Mayor served as a physician at the cantonal hospice of Perreux-sur-Boudry (Neuchâtel). After retirement in 1942, he continued his mycological research at first in the Institute of Zoology and later at the Institute of Botany in Neuchâtel. Throughout his career, Mayor accumulated extensive mycological collections, renowned for their high quality and scientific value. These collections, donated by Mayor in 1969, are preserved at the Institute of Botany of the University of Neuchâtel and have been frequently referenced by leading mycologists globally.

Mayor was actively involved in scientific societies. He was president of the Société Neuchâteloise des Sciences Naturelles from 1912 to 1914, a member of various commissions including the Neuchâtel commission for nature conservation, the Swiss commission for cryptogamic flora, and the commission of the Neuchâtel Museum of Natural History. He was also the French editor of the Revue hospitalière suisse from 1949 to 1962 and the editor of Feuilles d'hygiène de Neuchâtel.

== Awards and honours ==
Mayor received honorary degrees from the Universities of Bern and Neuchâtel, and was awarded the Chevalier of the Legion of Honour in France. He also received the prestigious prize from the Société Neuchâteloise des Sciences Naturelles for his comprehensive 1958 "Catalogue des Péronosporales, Taphrinales, Erysiphacées, Ustilaginales et Urédinales du canton de Neuchâtel". He was the author of numerous articles on mycology (Notes mycologiques) in the publication, "Bulletin de la Société Neuchâteloise".

== Selected works ==
Mayor published nearly 120 scientific works from 1901 to 1976, including numerous articles in the Bulletin de la Murithienne and Bulletin de la Société Neuchâteloise. Some notable publications include:

- Contribution a l’étude des champignons du Canton de Neuchâtel, 1911 – Contribution to the study of fungi of the canton of Neuchâtel.
- Recherches expérimentales sur quelques urédinées hétéroiques, 1911 – Experimental research on some heteroecious rusts.
- Contribution à l’étude de la flore cryptogamique du Canton du Valais, 1911 (with Denis Cruchet, Paul Cruchet) – Contribution to the study of cryptogamic flora of the canton of Valais.
- Contribution à l’etude des urédinées de Colombie, 1913 – Contribution to the study of rusts of Colombia.
- Les maladies de nos cultures maraichères, 1915.
- Contribution à l’étude des micromycètes de Languedoc et de Provence, 1949 (with Georges Viennot-Bourgin) – Contribution to the study of microfungi of Languedoc and Provence.
- Contribution à l’étude des micromycètes de Corse, 1950 (with Georges Viennot-Bourgin) – Contribution to the study of microfungi of Corsica.
- Contribution à la connaissance de micromycètes de la Côte d’Ivoire, 1951 (with Georges Viennot-Bourgin) – Contribution to the knowledge of microfungi of the Ivory Coast.
