= Villers-le-Lac =

- Commune
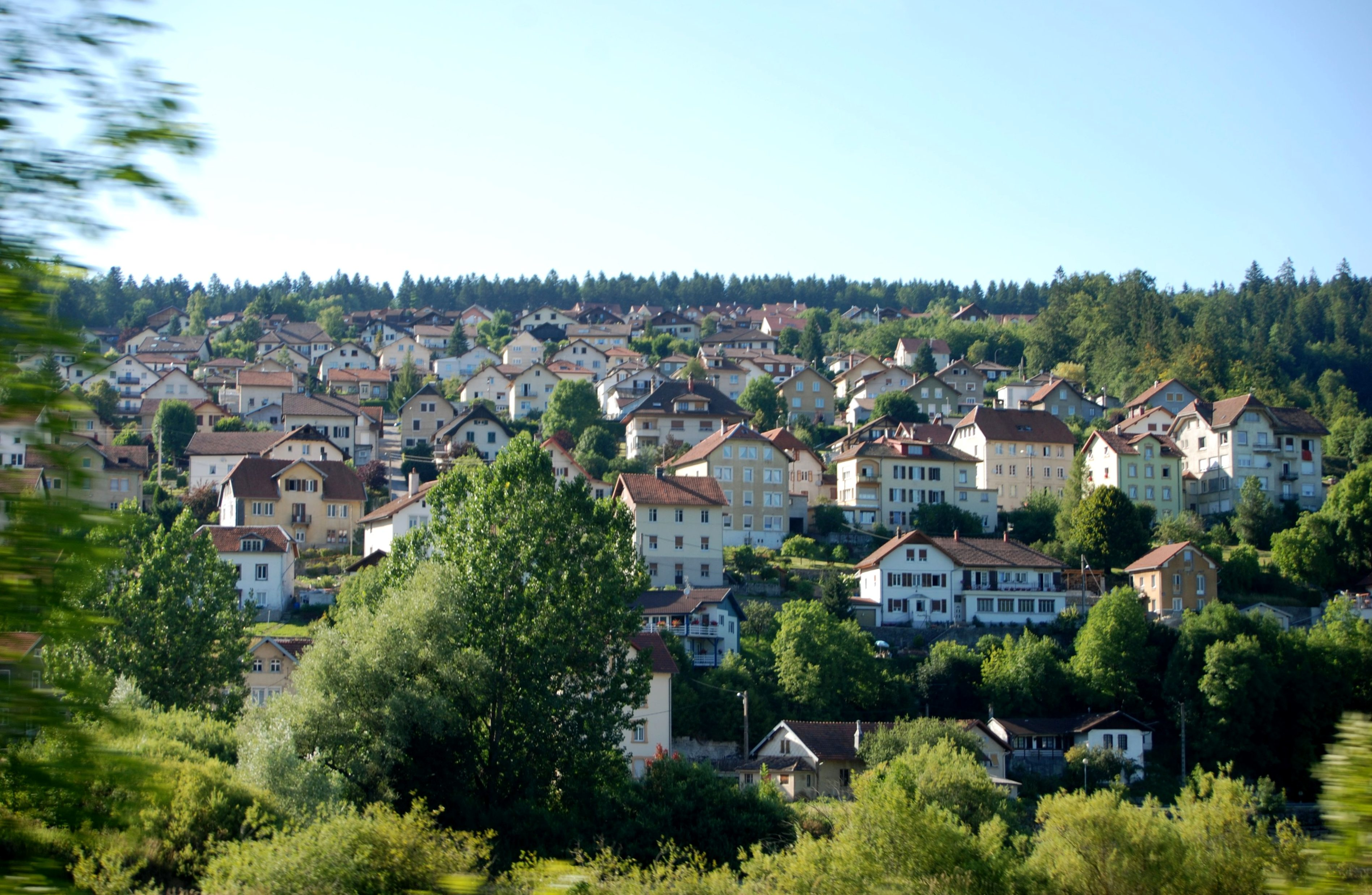
- A general view of Villers-le-Lac

- Coat of arms
- Location of Villers-le-Lac
- Location within France Location within Bourgogne-Franche-Comté
- Coordinates: 47°03′41″N 6°40′15″E
- Country: France
- Region: Bourgogne-Franche-Comté
- Department: Doubs
- Arrondissement: Pontarlier
- Canton: Morteau
- Intercommunality: Val de Morteau

Government
  - Mayor (2020–2026): Dominique Mollier
- Area^{1}: 30.17 km^{2} (11.65 sq mi)
- Highest elevation: 1,260 m (4,130 ft)
- Lowest elevation: 650 m (2,130 ft)
- Population (2023): 5,292
  - Density: 175.4/km^{2} (454.3/sq mi)
- Time zone: UTC+01:00 (CET)
  - Summer (DST): UTC+02:00 (CEST)
- INSEE/Postal code: 25321 /25130
- ^{1} French Land Register data, which excludes lakes, ponds, glaciers > 1 km^{2} (0.386 sq mi or 247 acres) and river estuaries.

Villers-le-Lac (French pronunciation: [vilɛʁ lə lak], before 1948: Lac-ou-Villers) is a commune in the Doubs department in the Bourgogne-Franche-Comté region in eastern France.

== Geography ==
The commune lies in the Jura Mountains on the Swiss border.

== Population ==
Historical population
Year	Pop.	±% p.a.
1968	3,828	—
1975	4,428	+2.10%
1982	4,142	−0.95%
1990	4,203	+0.18%
1999	4,196	−0.02%
2007	4,352	+0.46%
2012	4,569	+0.98%
2017	4,985	+1.76%
2023	5,292	+1.00%
Source: INSEE

== See also ==
- Communes of the Doubs department
