= Le Locle District =

Coordinates: 47°03′25″N 6°44′55″E

Le Locle District District du Locle
- District
- Country: Switzerland
- Canton: Neuchâtel
- Capital: Le Locle
- Dissolved: 1 January 2018

Area
  - Total: 137.85 km^{2} (53.22 sq mi)

Population (2017)
  - Total: 14,414
  - Density: 104.56/km^{2} (270.82/sq mi)
- Time zone: UTC+1 (CET)
  - Summer (DST): UTC+2 (CEST)
- Municipalities: 7

Le Locle District was one of the six districts of the canton of Neuchâtel, Switzerland, until the district level was eliminated on 1 January 2018. The district capital was the town of Le Locle. It had a population of 14,414.

== Municipalities ==
The district consists of the following municipalities:

Coat of Arms	Municipality	Population (31 December 2020)	Area km^{2}
Brot-Plamboz	Brot-Plamboz	290	16.03
La Brévine	La Brévine	624	41.82
Les Brenets	Les Brenets	1,014	11.53
Le Cerneux-Péquignot	Le Cerneux-Péquignot	313	15.67
La Chaux-du-Milieu	La Chaux-du-Milieu	514	17.28
Le Locle	Le Locle	9,864	23.14
Les Ponts-de-Martel	Les Ponts-de-Martel	1,230	18.23
Total		14,414	143.7

== Demographics ==
Most of the population (as of 2000) speaks French (13,143 or 90.0%) as their first language, Italian is the second most common (449 or 3.1%) and German is the third (309 or 2.1%). There are 8 people who speak Romansh.

As of 2008, the population was 49.3% male and 50.7% female. The population was made up of 5,456 Swiss men (38.7% of the population) and 1,490 (10.6%) non-Swiss men. There were 5,875 Swiss women (41.7%) and 1,282 (9.1%) non-Swiss women.

Of the population in the district, 5,591 or about 38.3% were born in Locle and lived there in 2000. There were 3,149 or 21.6% who were born in the same canton, while 2,136 or 14.6% were born somewhere else in Switzerland, and 3,037 or 20.8% were born outside of Switzerland.

As of 2000, there were 5,484 people who were single and never married in the district. There were 7,154 married individuals, 1,143 widows or widowers and 822 individuals who are divorced.

There were 2,228 households that consist of only one person and 397 households with five or more people.

The historical population is given in the following chart:

== Politics ==
In the 2007 federal election the most popular party was the SVP which received 23.35% of the vote. The next three most popular parties were the SP (21.15%), the PdA Party (19.12%) and the LPS Party (17.32%). In the federal election, a total of 4,969 votes were cast, and the voter turnout was 51.8%.

== Religion ==
From the 2000 census, 4,491 or 30.8% were Roman Catholic, while 5,275 or 36.1% belonged to the Swiss Reformed Church. Of the rest of the population, there were 66 members of an Orthodox church (or about 0.45% of the population), there were 32 individuals (or about 0.22% of the population) who belonged to the Christian Catholic Church, and there were 1,096 individuals (or about 7.51% of the population) who belonged to another Christian church. There were 351 (or about 2.40% of the population) who were Islamic. There were 32 individuals who were Buddhist, 1 person who was Hindu and 20 individuals who belonged to another church. 3,006 (or about 20.58% of the population) belonged to no church, are agnostic or atheist, and 772 individuals (or about 5.29% of the population) did not answer the question.

== Education ==
In Locle about 4,907 or (33.6%) of the population have completed non-mandatory upper secondary education, and 1,364 or (9.3%) have completed additional higher education (either university or a Fachhochschule). Of the 1,364 who completed tertiary schooling, 57.6% were Swiss men, 22.7% were Swiss women, 13.3% were non-Swiss men and 6.4% were non-Swiss women.

In the canton of Neuchâtel most municipalities provide two years of non-mandatory kindergarten, followed by five years of mandatory primary education. The next four years of mandatory secondary education is provided at thirteen larger secondary schools, which many students travel out of their home municipality to attend. During the 2010-11 school year, there were 15.5 kindergarten classes with a total of 277 students in District du Locle. In the same year, there were 45.5 primary classes with a total of 828 students.
