= Le Cerneux-Péquignot =

- Municipality
- Flag Coat of arms
- Location of Le Cerneux-Péquignot
- Location within Switzerland Location within Canton of Neuchâtel
- Coordinates: 47°1′N 6°40′E
- Country: Switzerland
- Canton: Neuchâtel

Area
  - Total: 15.67 km^{2} (6.05 sq mi)
- Elevation: 1,088 m (3,570 ft)

Population (December 2007)
  - Total: 330
  - Density: 21/km^{2} (55/sq mi)
- Time zone: UTC+01:00 (CET)
  - Summer (DST): UTC+02:00 (CEST)
- Postal code: 2414
- SFOS number: 6434
- ISO 3166 code: CH-NE
- Surrounded by: Grand'Combe-Châteleu (FR-25), La Brévine, La Chaux-du-Milieu, Le Locle, Montlebon (FR-25), Villers-le-Lac (FR-25)
- Website: http://www.cerneux-pequignot.ch

Le Cerneux-Péquignot is a municipality in the canton of Neuchâtel in Switzerland.

== History ==
Le Cerneux-Péquignot is first mentioned in the 13th century in connection with the Pequignot of Montlebon family.

== Geography ==
Aerial view (1950)

Le Cerneux-Péquignot has an area, as of 2009, of 15.7 square kilometers (6.1 mi^{2}). Of this area, 8.61 km^{2} (3.32 mi^{2}) or 54.9% is used for agricultural purposes, while 6.34 km^{2} (2.45 mi^{2}) or 40.5% is forested. Of the rest of the land, 0.45 km^{2} (0.17 mi^{2}) or 2.9% is settled (buildings or roads), 0.01 km^{2} (2.5 acres) or 0.1% is either rivers or lakes and 0.24 km^{2} (0.093 mi^{2}) or 1.5% is unproductive land.

Of the built up area, housing and buildings made up 1.4% and transportation infrastructure made up 1.1%. Out of the forested land, 36.2% of the total land area is heavily forested and 4.2% is covered with orchards or small clusters of trees. Of the agricultural land, 0.1% is used for growing crops and 35.2% is pastures and 19.7% is used for alpine pastures. All the water in the municipality is in lakes.

The municipality was located in the district of Le Locle, until the district level was eliminated on 1 January 2018. It is at an elevation of 1,070 meters (3,510 ft). It consists of the village of Le Cerneux-Péquignot, near the French border, along with a number of scattered hamlets and farm houses.

== Coat of arms ==
The blazon of the municipal coat of arms is Between four, one in dexter and three in sinister, Pine trees Vert, issuant from Base of the same a Plough Sable.

== Demographics ==
Le Cerneux-Péquignot has a population (as of December 2020) of 313. As of 2008, 2.9% of the population are resident foreign nationals. Over the last 10 years (2000–2010 ) the population has changed at a rate of 2.5%. It has changed at a rate of -0.9% due to migration and at a rate of 5% due to births and deaths.

Most of the population (as of 2000) speaks French (300 or 95.8%) as their first language, German is the second most common (8 or 2.6%) and Portuguese is the third (3 or 1.0%).

As of 2008, the population was 53.1% male and 46.9% female. The population was made up of 167 Swiss men (51.5% of the population) and 5 (1.5%) non-Swiss men. There were 145 Swiss women (44.8%) and 7 (2.2%) non-Swiss women. Of the population in the municipality, 141 or about 45.0% were born in Le Cerneux-Péquignot and lived there in 2000. There were 99 or 31.6% who were born in the same canton, while 42 or 13.4% were born somewhere else in Switzerland, and 20 or 6.4% were born outside of Switzerland.

As of 2000, children and teenagers (0–19 years old) make up 26.2% of the population, while adults (20–64 years old) make up 58.8% and seniors (over 64 years old) make up 15%.

As of 2000, there were 120 people who were single and never married in the municipality. There were 170 married individuals, 17 widows or widowers and 6 individuals who are divorced.

As of 2000, there were 115 private households in the municipality, and an average of 2.7 persons per household. There were 21 households that consist of only one person and 14 households with five or more people. In 2000, a total of 109 apartments (86.5% of the total) were permanently occupied, while 14 apartments (11.1%) were seasonally occupied and 3 apartments (2.4%) were empty.

The historical population is given in the following chart:

== Politics ==
In the 2007 federal election the most popular party was the SVP which received 27.35% of the vote. The next three most popular parties were the LPS Party (24.22%), the Green Party (15.65%) and the SP (11.56%). In the federal election, a total of 155 votes were cast, and the voter turnout was 62.5%.

== Economy ==
As of 2010, Le Cerneux-Péquignot had an unemployment rate of 1.9%. As of 2008, there were 48 people employed in the primary economic sector and about 20 businesses involved in this sector. 28 people were employed in the secondary sector and there were 6 businesses in this sector. 24 people were employed in the tertiary sector, with 10 businesses in this sector. There were 152 residents of the municipality who were employed in some capacity, of which females made up 40.1% of the workforce.

In 2008 the total number of full-time equivalent jobs was 80. The number of jobs in the primary sector was 36, all of which were in agriculture. The number of jobs in the secondary sector was 26, all of which were in manufacturing. The number of jobs in the tertiary sector was 18. In the tertiary sector; 4 or 22.2% were in wholesale or retail sales or the repair of motor vehicles, 4 or 22.2% were in a hotel or restaurant, 1 was in the information industry, 2 or 11.1% were technical professionals or scientists, 3 or 16.7% were in education.

In 2000, there were 24 workers who commuted into the municipality and 70 workers who commuted away. The municipality is a net exporter of workers, with about 2.9 workers leaving the municipality for every one entering. About 29.2% of the workforce coming into Le Cerneux-Péquignot are coming from outside Switzerland. Of the working population, 5.9% used public transportation to get to work, and 44.1% used a private car.

== Religion ==
From the 2000 census, 171 or 54.6% were Roman Catholic, while 86 or 27.5% belonged to the Swiss Reformed Church. Of the rest of the population, there was 1 member of an Orthodox church and 1 individual who was Islamic. 40 (or about 12.78% of the population) belonged to no church, are agnostic or atheist, and 14 individuals (or about 4.47% of the population) did not answer the question.

== Education ==
In Le Cerneux-Péquignot about 115 or (36.7%) of the population have completed non-mandatory upper secondary education, and 21 or (6.7%) have completed additional higher education (either university or a Fachhochschule). Of the 21 who completed tertiary schooling, 76.2% were Swiss men, 19.0% were Swiss women.

In the canton of Neuchâtel most municipalities provide two years of non-mandatory kindergarten, followed by five years of mandatory primary education. The next four years of mandatory secondary education is provided at thirteen larger secondary schools, which many students travel out of their home municipality to attend. During the 2010-11 school year, there were 0.5 kindergarten classes with a total of 6 students in Le Cerneux-Péquignot. In the same year, there were 1.5 primary classes with a total of 22 students.

As of 2000, there was one student in Le Cerneux-Péquignot who came from another municipality, while 31 residents attended schools outside the municipality.
