= Crêt du Cervelet =

Mountain in Switzerland

- Location within Switzerland

Highest point
- Elevation: 1,308 m (4,291 ft)
- Prominence: 158 m (518 ft)
- Parent peak: Grand Som Martel
- Coordinates: 46°57′44″N 6°38′20″E

Geography
- Location: Neuchâtel, Switzerland
- Parent range: Jura Mountains

The Crêt du Cervelet (1,307 m) is a mountain of the Jura, located between La Brévine and Couvet in the canton of Neuchâtel.
