= Edouard Matthey =

19th-century Swiss bookseller, publisher and translator

- Born: June 15, 1833; Le Locle, Switzerland
- Died: July 23, 1886 (aged 53); Prilly, Switzerland
- Occupations: Bookseller, publisher, translator
- Spouse: None (remained unmarried)
- Parent(s): Edouard-Constant Matthey; Sophie Gindraux

Edouard Matthey (15 June 1833 – 23 July 1886) was a Swiss bookseller, publisher and translator from Le Locle. He served as an important cultural mediator between the German-speaking and French-speaking regions of Switzerland, France and Germany during the 19th century.

== Early life ==
Little is known about Matthey's childhood and youth beyond the names of his parents, Edouard-Constant Matthey and Sophie née Gindraux. He was born on 15 June 1833 in Le Locle and remained unmarried throughout his life. He was Protestant and held citizenship of Le Locle and La Chaux-du-Milieu.

== Career ==
=== Bookseller and publisher ===
From approximately 1853 to 1858, Matthey directed a bookstore at Kramgasse 154 in Bern. He was responsible for French-language books and magazines published by Bernhard Friedrich Haller and collaborated with the Geneva-based publishing house of Joël Cherbuliez.

During this period, Matthey served as editor and publisher of several publications. He edited the magazine L'Ordre (which had only one issue in 1853) and worked on L'Educateur populaire, published by Jules Paroz. He also edited Etrennes helvétiennes. Album suisse, which had a single publication in 1856.

=== Translation work ===
Alongside his publishing activities, Matthey worked as a translator, primarily of German literature. His translations included works by Berthold Auerbach and Johann Peter Hebel. In 1854, he translated into French the novel Der Bauern-Spiegel (The Peasants' Mirror), which Albert Bitzius had published in 1837 under the pseudonym Jeremias Gotthelf. Matthey maintained correspondence with Bitzius and, although he called Gotthelf the "Walter Scott of Bern" in reference to his popularity, he personally preferred Abraham Emanuel Fröhlich.

Matthey also wrote reviews for the magazine Musée suisse and was in contact with French publicists, writers and translators such as Jules Champfleury and Max Buchon. In 1854, he published Buchon's French translation of Gotthelf tales under the title Nouvelles bernoises. However, Buchon subsequently refused to continue collaborating with Matthey, considering him unreliable in business matters. In contrast, Marc Monnier praised Matthey's entrepreneurial spirit and willingness to take risks in a review.

=== Financial difficulties ===
In 1856, Matthey went bankrupt and his book inventory was sold at auction the following year. Eduard Lutz, the bankruptcy administrator, approached the Neuchâtel State Council in 1858 to recover funds from certain cantonal enterprises to pay Matthey's creditors, but the authorities referred him to judicial proceedings.

== Later life ==
After his bankruptcy, Matthey's whereabouts became uncertain. It is possible he worked unofficially for the Leidecker bookstore in Neuchâtel or for a paper mill in Serrières, but his residence from 1858 onwards is unknown. He may have tried his luck abroad. His activities in Prilly, where he died, remain obscure.

A work titled Souvenirs de l'exil, published in 1871 in Brussels under the name Edouard Mathey, appears to be largely fictional, though some elements may be based on his experiences. However, authorship of this text remains uncertain, as it has also been attributed to Comtesse Dash.

== Death ==
Edouard Matthey died on 23 July 1886 in Prilly at the age of 53.
