= La Brévine =

- Municipality
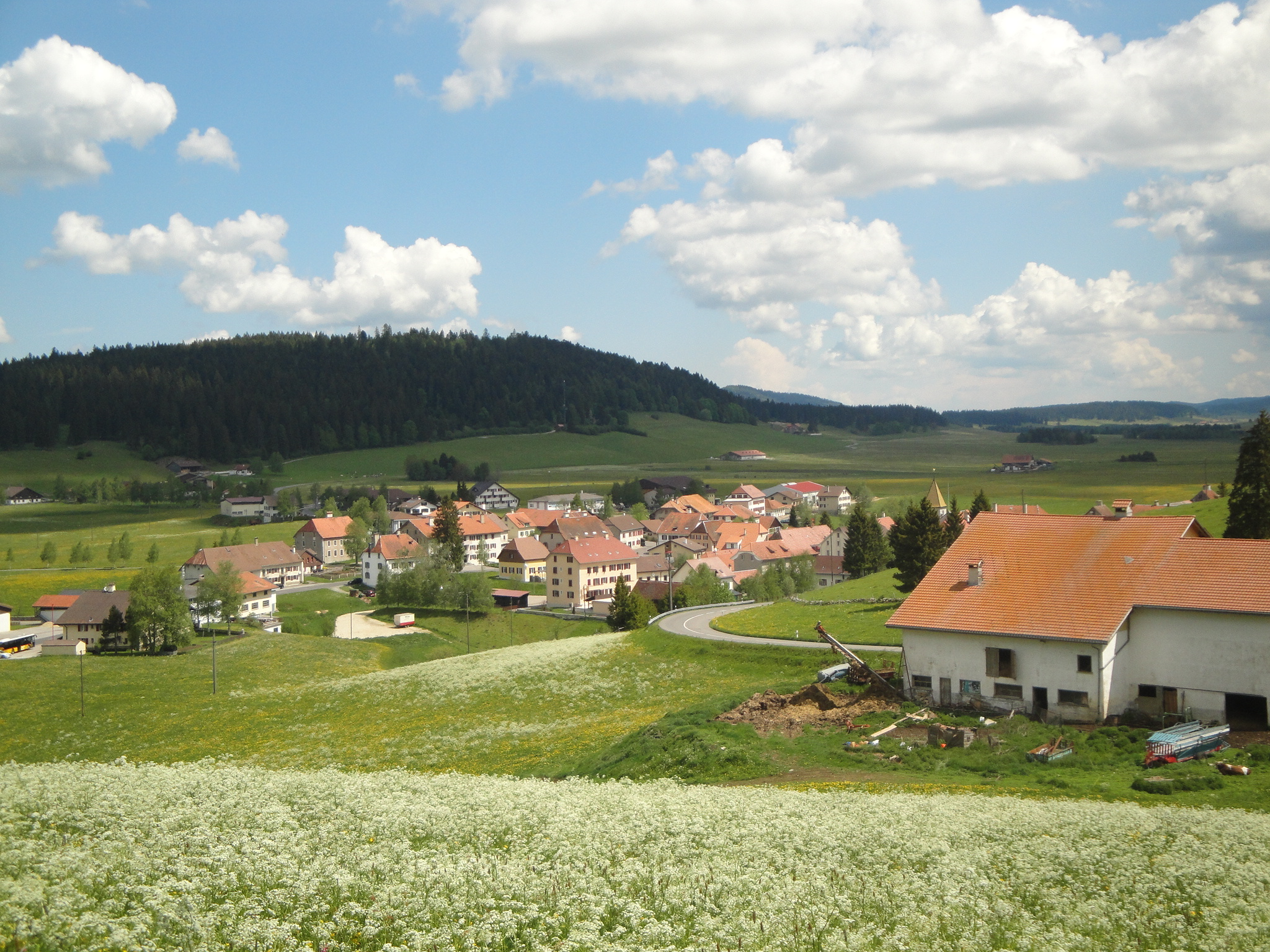
- Southwest view of La Brévine

- Flag Coat of arms
- Location of La Brévine
- Location within Switzerland Location within Canton of Neuchâtel
- Coordinates: 46°59′N 6°36′E
- Country: Switzerland
- Canton: Neuchâtel

Area
  - Total: 41.82 km^{2} (16.15 sq mi)
- Elevation: 1,043 m (3,422 ft)

Population (December 2007)
  - Total: 692
  - Density: 16.5/km^{2} (42.9/sq mi)
- Time zone: UTC+01:00 (CET)
  - Summer (DST): UTC+02:00 (CEST)
- Postal code: 2406
- SFOS number: 6432
- ISO 3166 code: CH-NE
- Surrounded by: Boveresse, Couvet, Grand'Combe-Châteleu (FR-25), Hauterive-la-Fresse (FR-25), La Chaux-du-Milieu, Le Cerneux-Péquignot, Les Bayards, Les Gras (FR-25), Les Ponts-de-Martel, Montbenoît (FR-25), Saint-Sulpice, Travers, Ville-du-Pont (FR-25)
- Twin towns: Leynes (France)
- Website: www.labrevine.ch

La Brévine (French pronunciation: [la bʁevin], Franco-Provençal: [la brəˈvəna]) is a municipality in the Neuchâtel Canton in Switzerland. It is the largest village in its eponymous valley, Vallée de la Brévine. The area is renowned for its complex microclimate, which is often much colder than nearby locations.

== History ==
Although the earliest history is murky and given to folklore and speculation, the Vallée de la Brévine was reclaimed by local settlers from the Val de Travers from the 13th century onwards. Emigrants from Burgundy arrived during the 14th century. The toponymy of the name La Brévine is disputed; some sources interpret it as a variant of the word abreuvoir ("watering hole"), while others trace it back to a Common Celtic *Bebrona ("beaver stream").

In the 17th century, "La Brévine" was used solely to refer to the village. It was not until the 18th century that the name was used to refer to the municipality. The hamlet of Bémont was first mentioned in 1266 as Bemont, and Les Taillères was first mentioned in 1304 as Chaul de Estaleres. In the mid-1600s, iron carbonate was discovered in parts of La Brevine. In the middle of the 19th century, baths were built there, thanks to a subsidy by King Frédéric-Guillaume IV of Prussia, who was then still Prince of Neuchâtel. Today, the baths are no longer functioning.

== Geography ==
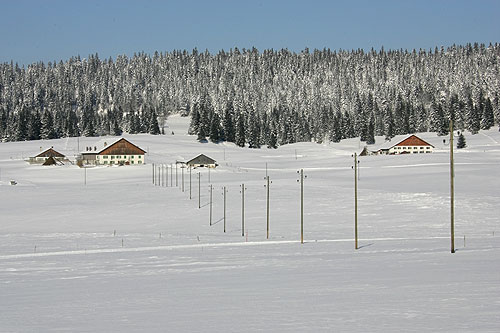
Farm houses in the Vallée de la Brévine

Aerial view (1950)

La Brévine's area is 41.8 square kilometres (16+1/8 sq mi) as of 2009. Of this area, 22.41 km2 (8+21/32 sq mi) or 53.6% is used for agricultural purposes, while 17.76 km2 (6+27/32 sq mi) or 42.5% is forested. Of the rest of the land, 0.97 km2 (240 acres) or 2.3% is settled (buildings or roads), 0.42 km2 (104 acres) or 1.0% is either rivers or lakes, and 0.4 km2 (100 acres) or 1.0% is unproductive land.

Of the built-up area, housing and buildings made up 1.3%, and transportation infrastructure made up 0.9%. Of the forested land, 37.5% is heavily forested, and 4.9% is covered with orchards or small clusters of trees. Of the agricultural land, 0.3% is used for growing crops, 32.9% is pastures, and 20.4% is used for alpine pastures. All the water in the municipality is in lakes.

The municipality was located in the district of Le Locle until the district level was eliminated on 1 January 2018. It is near the French border. It consists of the village of La Brévine (elevation 1,046 m or 3,432 ft) and the hamlets of Le Brouillet, Bémont, Les Taillères and La Châtagne, as well as scattered farmhouses.

The largest lake in the valley, the Lac des Taillères, is located 2 km (1+1/4 mi) from the village. The highest point of the valley, the Crêt du Cervelet, is located 3 km (2 mi) from the town.

== Coat of arms ==
The blazon of the municipal coat of arms is Azure bordered Or, a Fountain Argent.

== Demographics ==
La Brévine had a population of 624 (as of December 2020). As of 2008, 3.2% were resident foreign nationals. Over the 2000s, the population size changed by −0.1%. It has changed at a rate of −0.4% due to migration and a rate of 1% due to births and deaths.

As of 2000, most of the population spoke French (616 or 95.2%) as their first language, with German as the second most common language (22 or 3.4%), and Portuguese as the third (4 or 0.6%). There was one person who spoke Italian and one person who spoke Romansh.

As of 2008, the population was 48.9% male and 51.1% female. The population comprised 308 Swiss men (47.0%) and 12 (1.8%) non-Swiss men. There were 324 Swiss women (49.5%) and 11 (1.7%) non-Swiss women. Of the population in the municipality, 326 or about 50.4%, were born in La Brévine and lived there in 2000. There were 169, or 26.1%, born in the same canton, while 85 or 13.1%, were born somewhere else in Switzerland, and 28 or 4.3%, were born outside of Switzerland.

As of 2000, children and teenagers (0–19 years old) make up 27.5% of the population, while adults (20–64 years old) make up 56.1%, and seniors (over 64 years old) make up 16.4%.

As of 2000, 252 people were single and never married in the municipality. There were 332 married individuals, 36 widows or widowers and 27 individuals who were divorced.

As of 2000, there were 249 private households in the municipality and an average of 2.6 persons per household. Sixty-six households comprised only one person and 30 families with five or more people In 2000, a total of 244 apartments (72.4% of the total) were permanently occupied, while 65 apartments (19.3%) were seasonally occupied, and 28 apartments (8.3%) were empty.

The historical population is given in the following chart:

== Heritage sites of national significance ==
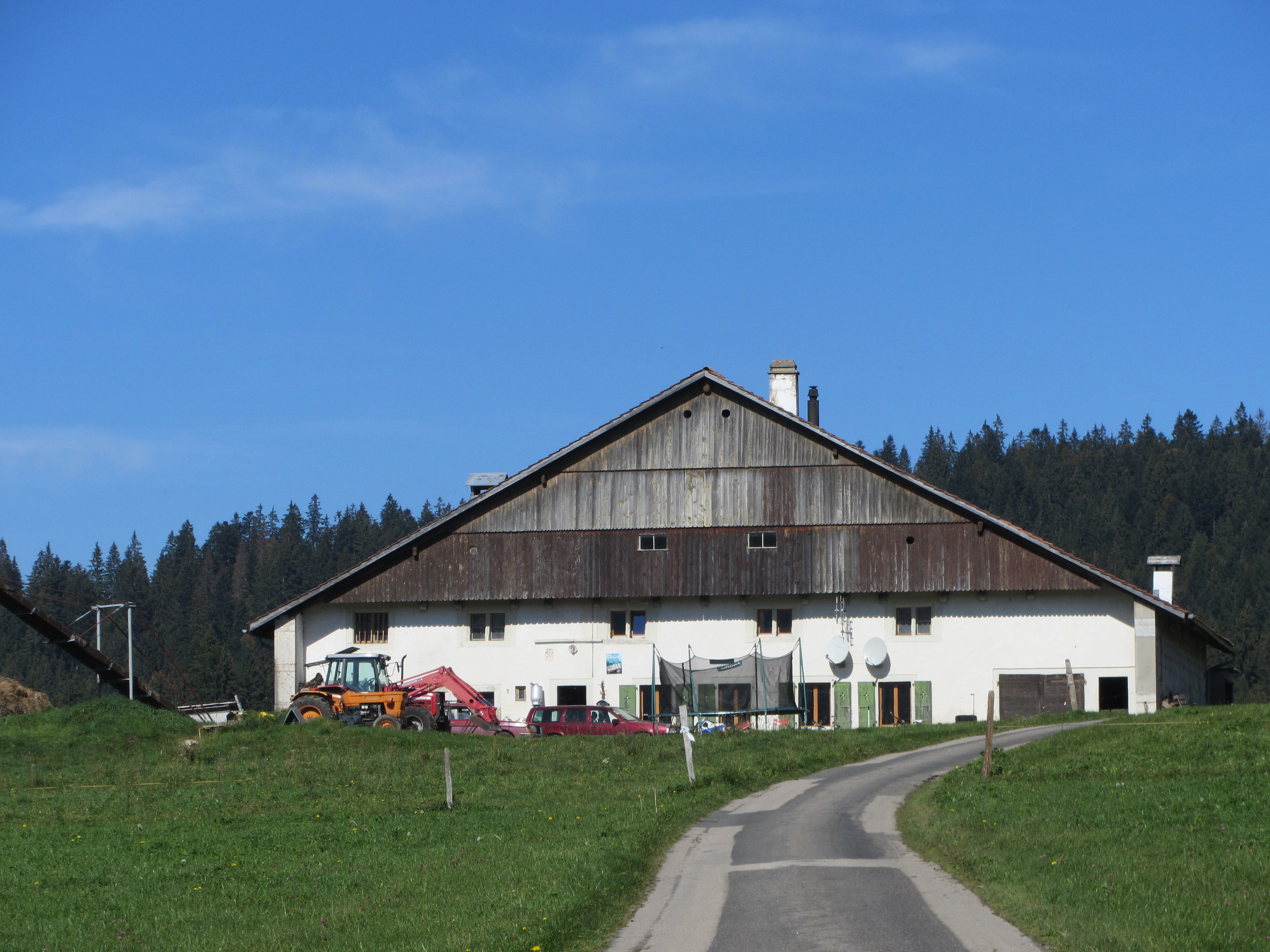
Maison double (double house) or La Grosse Maison

The Double House is listed as a Swiss heritage site of national significance.

== Politics ==
The most popular party in the 2007 federal election was the SVP which received 38.69% of the vote. The following three most popular parties were the LPS Party (21.44%), the FDP (14.57%) and the SP (10.17%). In the federal election, a total of 298 votes were cast, and the voter turnout was 54.3%.

== Economy ==
As of 2010, La Brévine had an unemployment rate of 1.1%. As of 2008, there were 157 people employed in the primary economic sector and about 61 businesses involved in this sector. Sixty people were used in the secondary industry, and there were 13 businesses in this sector. One hundred and five people were employed in the tertiary sector, with 35 firms in this sector. Three hundred fifteen municipality residents were used in some capacity, of which women comprised 41.6% of the workforce.

In 2008, the total number of full-time equivalent jobs was 258. The number of jobs in the primary sector was 121, of which 118 were in agriculture and four were in forestry or lumber production. The number of jobs in the secondary sector was 57, of which 28 (49.1%) were in manufacturing, and 28 (49.1%) were in construction. The number of jobs in the tertiary sector was 80. In the tertiary sector, 28 or 35.0% were in wholesale or retail sales or the repair of motor vehicles, 16 or 20.0% were in the movement and storage of goods, 17 or 21.3% were in a hotel or restaurant, 1 was the insurance or financial industry, 3 or 3.8% were technical professionals or scientists, 8 or 10.0% were in education.

In 2000, 68 workers commuted into the municipality, and 109 workers commuted away. The municipality is a net exporter of workers, with about 1.6 workers leaving the city for everyone entering. About 20.6% of the workforce entering La Brévine comes from outside Switzerland. Of the working population, 3.5% used public transportation to get to work, and 42.2% used a private car.

== Religion ==
From the 2000 census, 107 or 16.5%, were Roman Catholic, while 447 or 69.1%, belonged to the Swiss Reformed Church. Of the rest of the population, 13 individuals (or about 2.01% of the population) belonged to another Christian church. 47 (or about 7.26% of the population) belonged to no church, were agnostic or atheist, and 39 individuals (or about 6.03%) did not answer the question.

== Climate ==
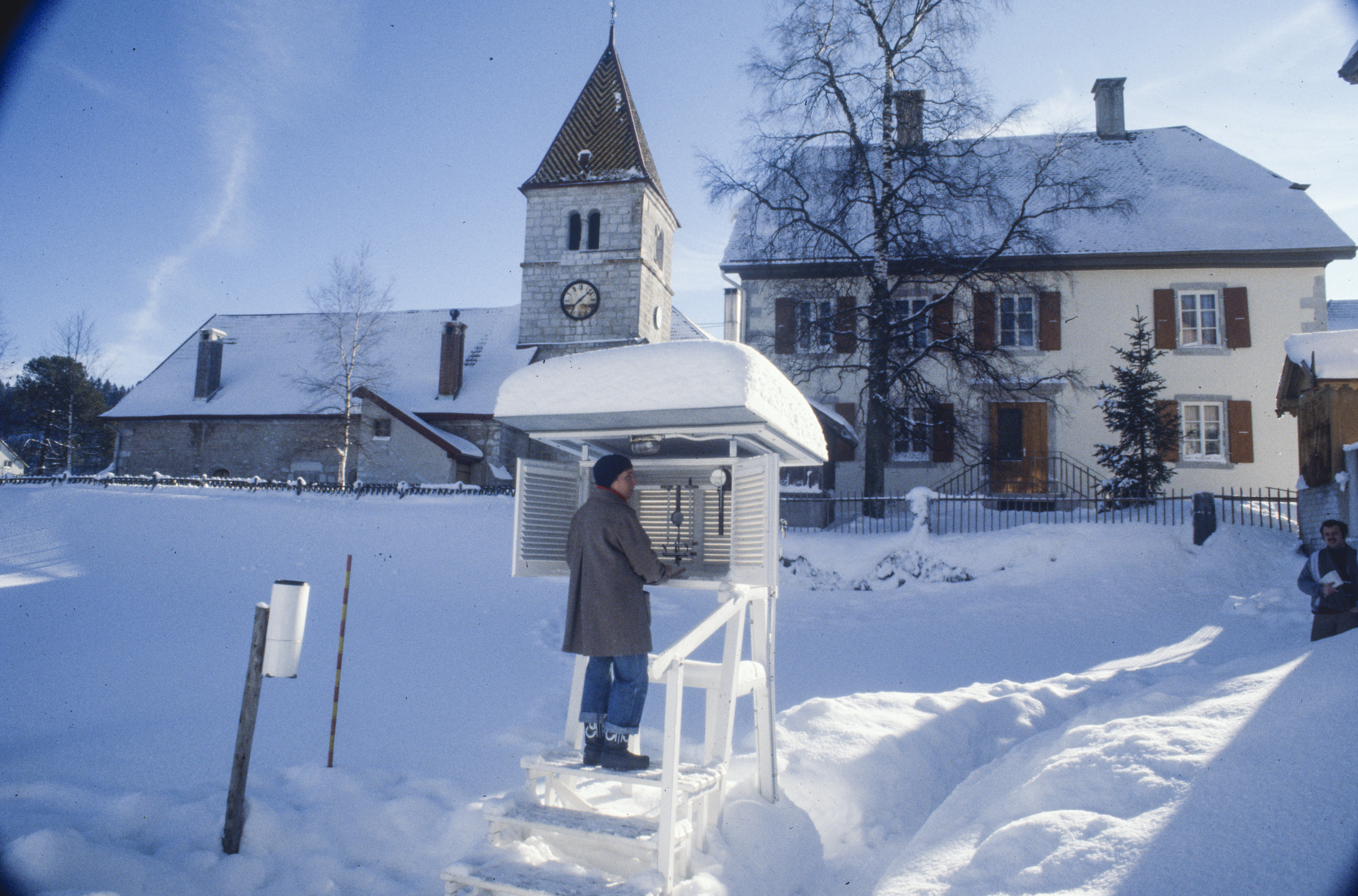
Weather station with the church in winter

La Brévine is known as the "Siberia of Switzerland" on account of its climatic extremes, being the inhabited locality where the lowest temperature was ever measured. The valley's microclimate is often much colder than other nearby locations. On 12 January 1987, the local weather station recorded a temperature of −41.8 °C (−43.2 °F), the coldest ever officially recorded by MeteoSwiss in Switzerland. In comparison, the hottest temperature in Switzerland was 41.5 °C (106.7 °F) in Grono. La Brévine is often popularized as the coldest location in the country, although many towns in the high Alps, for instance, Samedan, experience a much colder climate in general. Officially, the coldest place in Switzerland is the Jungfraujoch. Juf, as the highest village in the country, is probably its (or one of its) coldest inhabited place(s). Considering unofficial but notable measurements, lower temperatures were recorded in Switzerland, notably at Glattalp.

La Brévine has a borderline subarctic climate (Dfc) with mild, rainy summers and cold, snowy winters. Between 1991 and 2020, La Brévine had an average of 143.8 days of rain or snow per year and, on average, received 1,295 mm (51.0 in) of precipitation. The wettest month was July when La Brévine received an average of 131 mm (5.2 in) of rain or snow. During this month, there was precipitation for an average of 11.9 days. The month with the most days of precipitation was May, with an average of 14.2, but with only 128 mm (5.0 in) of rain or snow. The driest month of the year was February, with an average of 79 mm (3.1 in) of precipitation over 11.2 days.

Climate data for La Brévine, elevation 1,050 m (3,440 ft), (1991–2020)
Month	Jan	Feb	Mar	Apr	May	Jun	Jul	Aug	Sep	Oct	Nov	Dec	Year
Mean daily maximum °C (°F)	1.4 (34.5)	2.4 (36.3)	6.3 (43.3)	10.7 (51.3)	14.8 (58.6)	18.8 (65.8)	20.8 (69.4)	20.6 (69.1)	16.3 (61.3)	12.5 (54.5)	6.4 (43.5)	2.5 (36.5)	11.1 (52.0)
Daily mean °C (°F)	−3.5 (25.7)	−3.2 (26.2)	0.8 (33.4)	4.6 (40.3)	8.9 (48.0)	12.5 (54.5)	14.4 (57.9)	13.8 (56.8)	10.0 (50.0)	6.5 (43.7)	1.4 (34.5)	−2.1 (28.2)	5.3 (41.5)
Mean daily minimum °C (°F)	−9.4 (15.1)	−9.8 (14.4)	−5.4 (22.3)	−2.3 (27.9)	1.7 (35.1)	5.1 (41.2)	6.7 (44.1)	6.2 (43.2)	3.4 (38.1)	0.6 (33.1)	−4.0 (24.8)	−7.6 (18.3)	−1.2 (29.8)
Average precipitation mm (inches)	86.0 (3.39)	79.0 (3.11)	84.9 (3.34)	95.9 (3.78)	127.5 (5.02)	122.4 (4.82)	131.0 (5.16)	117.8 (4.64)	113.9 (4.48)	115.2 (4.54)	107.6 (4.24)	113.5 (4.47)	1,294.7 (50.97)
Average snowfall cm (inches)	68.4 (26.9)	68.3 (26.9)	54.4 (21.4)	23.8 (9.4)	4.2 (1.7)	0.0 (0.0)	0.0 (0.0)	0.0 (0.0)	0.0 (0.0)	2.4 (0.9)	29.7 (11.7)	56.4 (22.2)	307.6 (121.1)
Average precipitation days (≥ 1.0 mm)	12.2	11.2	11.4	11.6	14.2	11.8	11.9	11.4	10.6	12.4	12.0	13.1	143.8
Average snowy days (≥ 1.0 cm)	9.4	9.1	7.9	4.7	0.9	0.0	0.0	0.0	0.0	1.2	4.7	8.1	46.0
Average relative humidity (%)	86	84	81	78	79	78	78	79	83	84	86	86	82
Source 1: NOAA
Source 2: MeteoSwiss (snow 1981–2010)

== Education ==
In La Brévine, about 191 or (29.5%) of the population have completed non-mandatory upper secondary education, and 43 or (6.6%) have completed additional higher education (either university or a Fachhochschule). Of the 43 who completed tertiary schooling, 62.8% were Swiss men, and 32.6% were Swiss women.

In the canton of Neuchâtel, most municipalities provide two years of non-mandatory kindergarten, followed by five years of mandatory primary education. The next four years of compulsory secondary education are provided at thirteen larger secondary schools, which many students travel out of their home municipality to attend. During the 2010–11 school year, there was one kindergarten class with 11 students in La Brévine. In the same year, there were two primary classes with 40 students.

As of 2000, 18 students in La Brévine came from another municipality, while 30 residents attended schools outside the city.
