= Grand Som Martel =

Mountain in Switzerland

- Location within Switzerland

Highest point
- Elevation: 1,337 m (4,386 ft)
- Prominence: 212 m (696 ft)
- Parent peak: Mont Racine
- Coordinates: 47°01′23″N 6°45′03″E

Geography
- Location: Neuchâtel, Switzerland
- Parent range: Jura Mountains

The Grand Som Martel (1,337 m) is a mountain of the Jura, located between Le Locle and Les Ponts-de-Martel in the canton of Neuchâtel.
