= Rochefort, Neuchâtel =

Rochefort
- Municipality
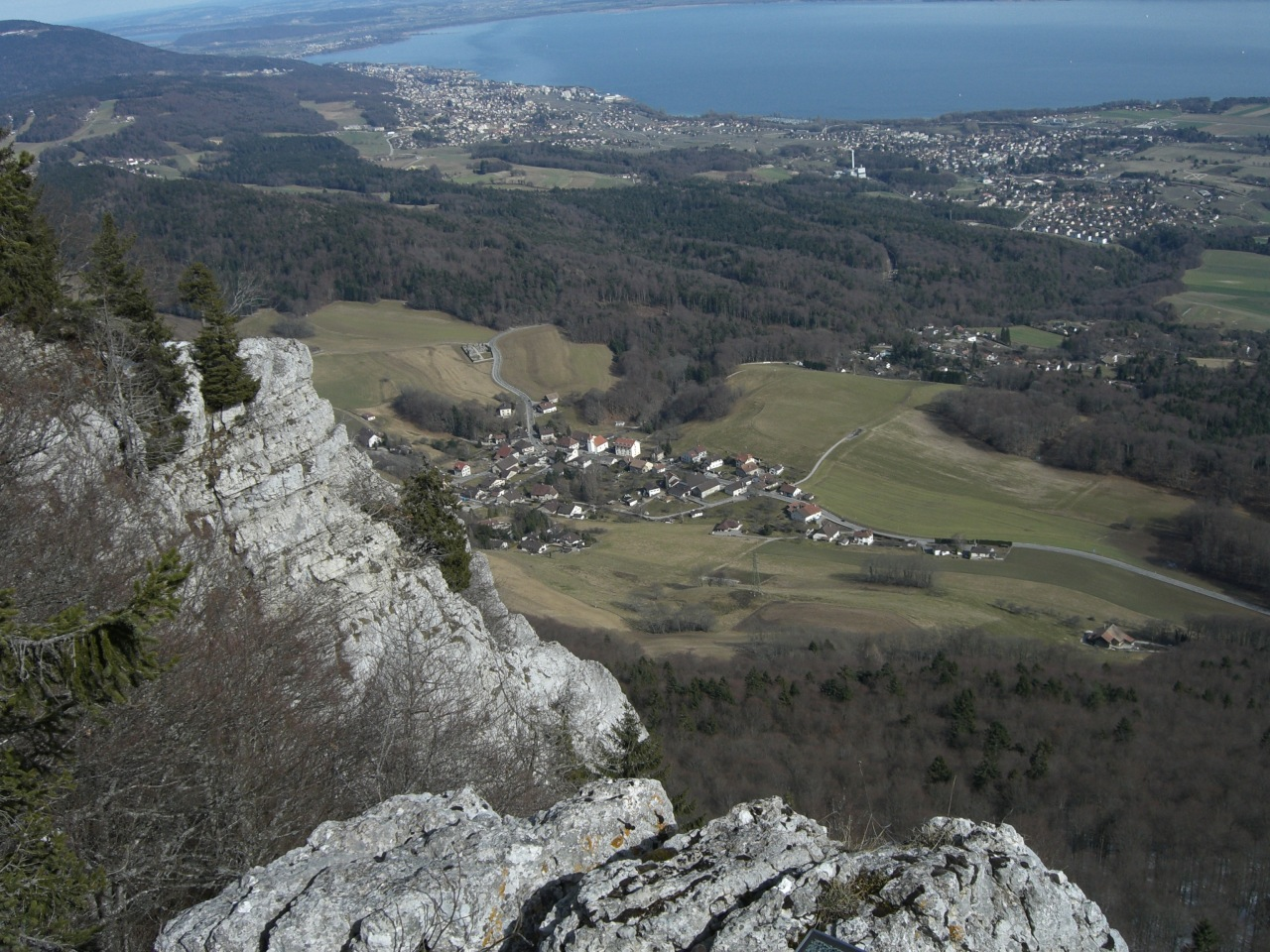

- Flag Coat of arms
- Location of Rochefort
- Location within Switzerland Location within Canton of Neuchâtel
- Coordinates: 46°59′N 6°49′E
- Country: Switzerland
- Canton: Neuchâtel

Area
  - Total: 20.89 km^{2} (8.07 sq mi)
- Elevation: 759 m (2,490 ft)

Population (December 2007)
  - Total: 1,035
  - Density: 49.55/km^{2} (128.3/sq mi)
- Time zone: UTC+01:00 (CET)
  - Summer (DST): UTC+02:00 (CEST)
- Postal code: 2019
- SFOS number: 6413
- ISO 3166 code: CH-NE
- Surrounded by: Boudry, Brot-Plamboz, Corcelles-Cormondrèche, La Sagne, Milvignes, Montmollin
- Website: www.rochefort.ch

Rochefort (French pronunciation: [ʁɔʃfɔʁ]) is a municipality in the canton of Neuchâtel in Switzerland. On 1 January 2016 it absorbed the small municipality of Brot-Dessous.

== History ==
Rochefort is first mentioned in 1184 as Rupeforti. In 1236 it was mentioned as Rochifort.

== Geography ==
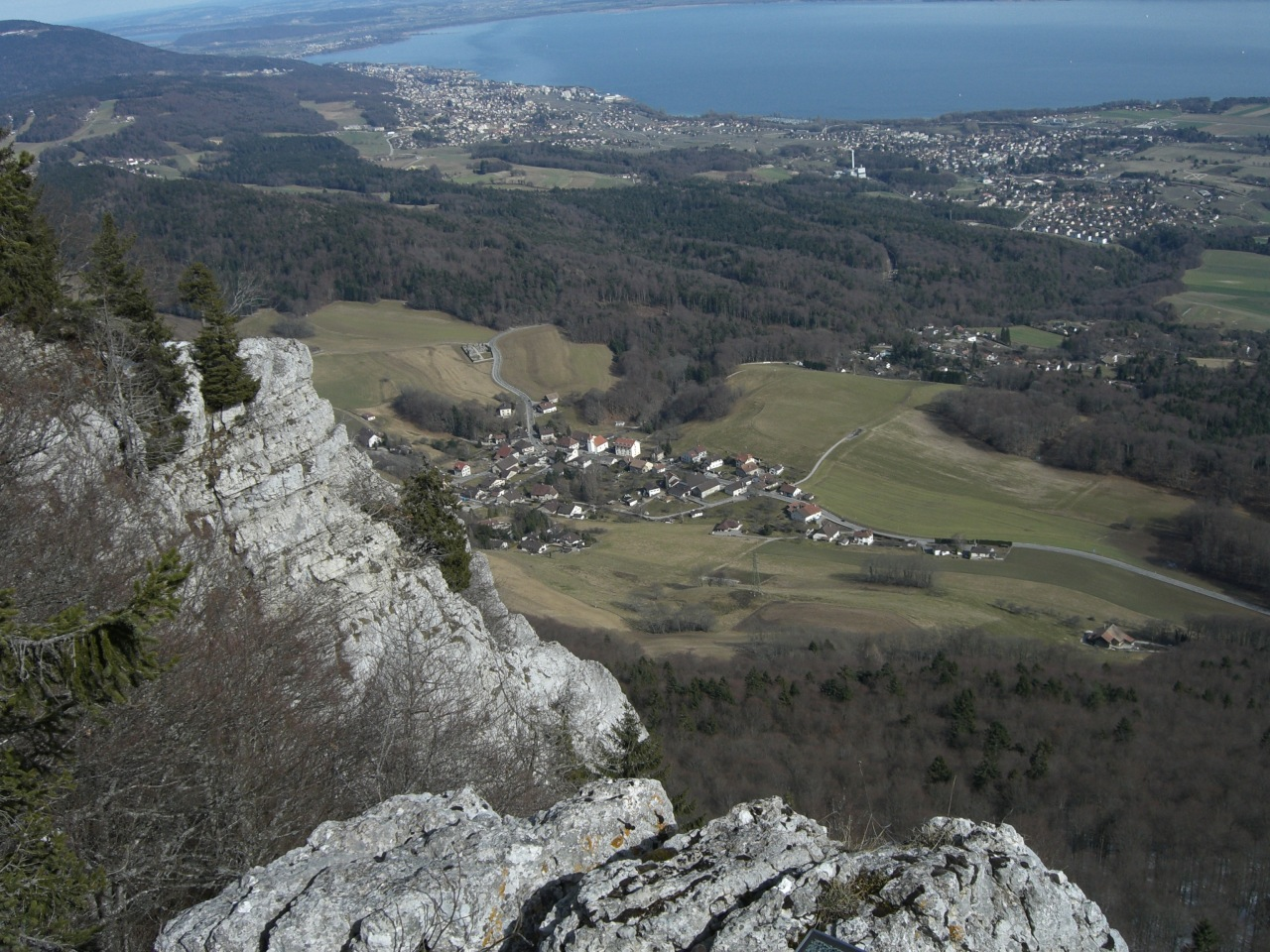
View from La Tourne, Rochefort is in the middle and Lake Neuchatel is in the background

Aerial view by Walter Mittelholzer (1927)

Before the 2016 merger Rochefort had an area, as of 2009, of 20.9 square kilometers (8.1 mi^{2}). Of this area, 6.76 km^{2} (2.61 mi^{2}) or 32.4% is used for agricultural purposes, while 13.05 km^{2} (5.04 mi^{2}) or 62.5% is forested. Of the rest of the land, 1.05 km^{2} (0.41 mi^{2}) or 5.0% is settled (buildings or roads) and 0.02 km^{2} (4.9 acres) or 0.1% is unproductive land.

Of the built up area, housing and buildings made up 3.0% and transportation infrastructure made up 1.8%. Out of the forested land, 58.3% of the total land area is heavily forested and 4.2% is covered with orchards or small clusters of trees. Of the agricultural land, 3.6% is used for growing crops and 10.9% is pastures and 17.5% is used for alpine pastures.

The municipality was located in the district of Boudry, until the district level was eliminated on 1 January 2018. It is at the intersection of the Colombier-Le Locle and Neuchatel-Pontarlier roads. It consists of the settlements of Rochefort, Montézillon, Chambrelien, Les Grattes, La Tourne and Crostand.

== Coat of arms ==
The blazon of the municipal coat of arms is Quartered Or and Gules and on a Border Sable eight Bezants.

== Demographics ==
Rochefort has a population (as of December 2020) of 1,291. As of 2008, 9.6% of the population are resident foreign nationals. Over the last 10 years (2000–2010 ) the population has changed at a rate of 11.7%. It has changed at a rate of 7.9% due to migration and at a rate of 3.5% due to births and deaths.

Most of the population (as of 2000) speaks French (909 or 87.7%) as their first language, German is the second most common (56 or 5.4%) and English is the third (14 or 1.4%). There are 9 people who speak Italian and 1 person who speaks Romansh.

As of 2008, the population was 49.2% male and 50.8% female. The population was made up of 462 Swiss men (43.5% of the population) and 60 (5.7%) non-Swiss men. There were 490 Swiss women (46.2%) and 49 (4.6%) non-Swiss women. Of the population in the municipality, 223 or about 21.5% were born in Rochefort and lived there in 2000. There were 369 or 35.6% who were born in the same canton, while 218 or 21.0% were born somewhere else in Switzerland, and 119 or 11.5% were born outside of Switzerland.

As of 2000, children and teenagers (0–19 years old) make up 25% of the population, while adults (20–64 years old) make up 62% and seniors (over 64 years old) make up 13%.

As of 2000, there were 441 people who were single and never married in the municipality. There were 505 married individuals, 48 widows or widowers and 42 individuals who are divorced.

As of 2000, there were 393 private households in the municipality, and an average of 2.4 persons per household. There were 111 households that consist of only one person and 29 households with five or more people. In 2000, a total of 371 apartments (78.9% of the total) were permanently occupied, while 85 apartments (18.1%) were seasonally occupied and 14 apartments (3.0%) were empty. As of 2009, the construction rate of new housing units was 1.9 new units per 1000 residents.

The historical population is given in the following chart:

== Heritage sites of national significance ==
The Cotencher, a Paleolithic cave, is listed as a Swiss heritage site of national significance.

== Politics ==
In the 2007 federal election the most popular party was the SP which received 20.85% of the vote. The next three most popular parties were the SVP (18.17%), the FDP (17.67%) and the Green Party (14.53%). In the federal election, a total of 441 votes were cast, and the voter turnout was 56.9%.

== Economy ==
As of 2010, Rochefort had an unemployment rate of 2.8%. As of 2008, there were 30 people employed in the primary economic sector and about 12 businesses involved in this sector. 27 people were employed in the secondary sector and there were 6 businesses in this sector. 131 people were employed in the tertiary sector, with 26 businesses in this sector. There were 531 residents of the municipality who were employed in some capacity, of which females made up 40.7% of the workforce.

In 2008 the total number of full-time equivalent jobs was 145. The number of jobs in the primary sector was 21, of which 17 were in agriculture and 4 were in forestry or lumber production. The number of jobs in the secondary sector was 26 of which 13 or (50.0%) were in manufacturing and 12 (46.2%) were in construction. The number of jobs in the tertiary sector was 98. In the tertiary sector; 9 or 9.2% were in wholesale or retail sales or the repair of motor vehicles, 23 or 23.5% were in the movement and storage of goods, 31 or 31.6% were in a hotel or restaurant, 15 or 15.3% were technical professionals or scientists, 4 or 4.1% were in education and 4 or 4.1% were in health care.

In 2000, there were 62 workers who commuted into the municipality and 424 workers who commuted away. The municipality is a net exporter of workers, with about 6.8 workers leaving the municipality for every one entering. Of the working population, 9.8% used public transportation to get to work, and 73.6% used a private car.

== Religion ==
From the 2000 census, 183 or 17.7% were Roman Catholic, while 484 or 46.7% belonged to the Swiss Reformed Church. Of the rest of the population, there were 56 individuals (or about 5.41% of the population) who belonged to another Christian church. There were 4 (or about 0.39% of the population) who were Islamic. There were 1 individual who belonged to another church. 229 (or about 22.10% of the population) belonged to no church, are agnostic or atheist, and 106 individuals (or about 10.23% of the population) did not answer the question.

== Education ==
In Rochefort about 376 or (36.3%) of the population have completed non-mandatory upper secondary education, and 175 or (16.9%) have completed additional higher education (either university or a Fachhochschule). Of the 175 who completed tertiary schooling, 57.7% were Swiss men, 27.4% were Swiss women, 8.0% were non-Swiss men and 6.9% were non-Swiss women.

In the canton of Neuchâtel most municipalities provide two years of non-mandatory kindergarten, followed by five years of mandatory primary education. The next four years of mandatory secondary education is provided at thirteen larger secondary schools, which many students travel out of their home municipality to attend. Both the kindergarten and the primary school are combined with Brot-Dessous. During the 2010-11 school year, there was one kindergarten class with a total of 16 students between the municipalities. In the same year, there were 3 primary classes with a total of 61 students.

As of 2000, there were 12 students in Rochefort who came from another municipality, while 97 residents attended schools outside the municipality.

== Transportation ==
The municipality has two railway stations: Champ-du-Moulin on the Neuchâtel–Pontarlier line and Chambrelien on the Neuchâtel–Le Locle-Col-des-Roches line. Between them it has frequent service to La Chaux-de-Fonds, Buttes, and Neuchâtel.
