= Lac des Taillères =

Lake in Neuchâtel, Switzerland

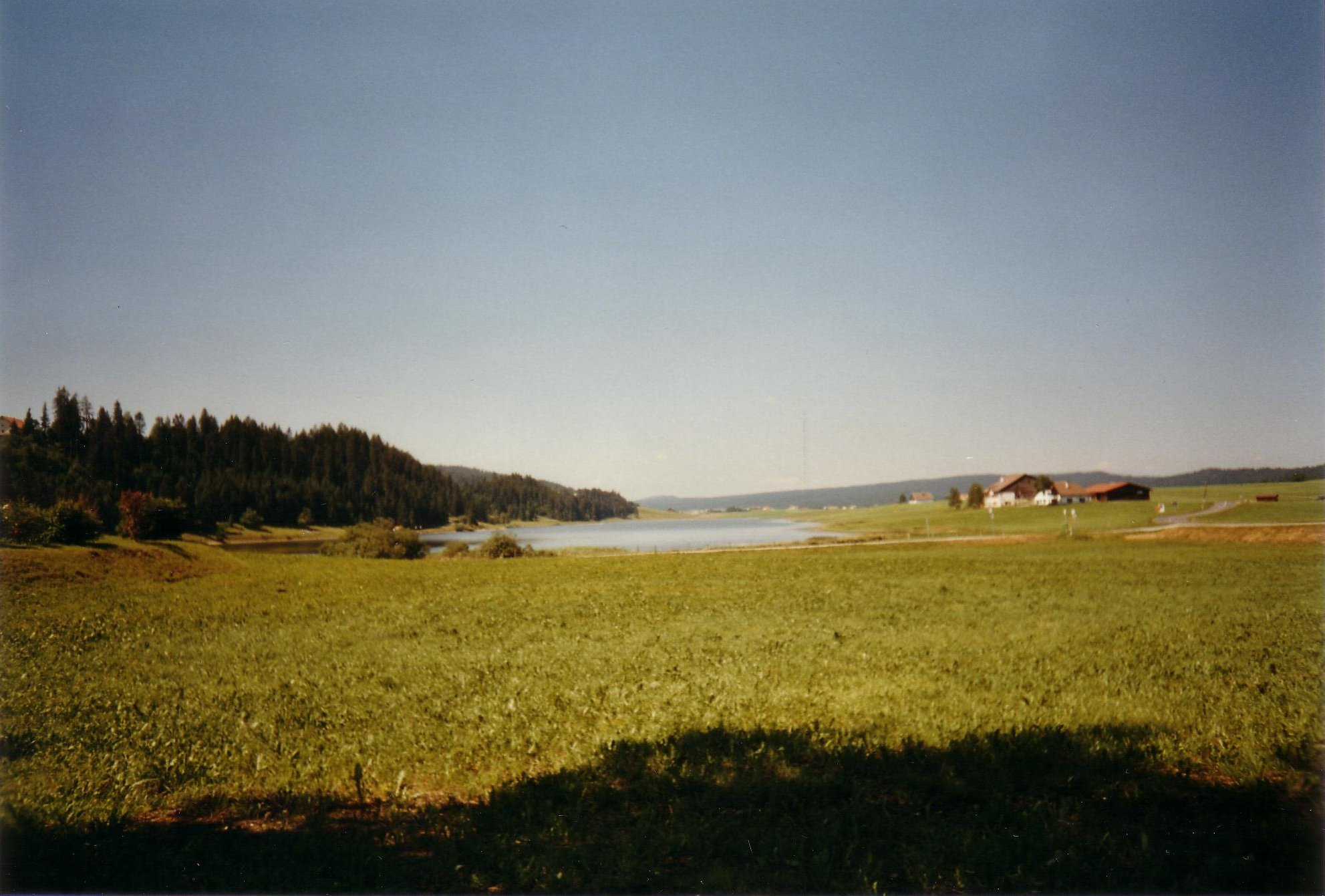
- The Lac des Taillères near the Brévine

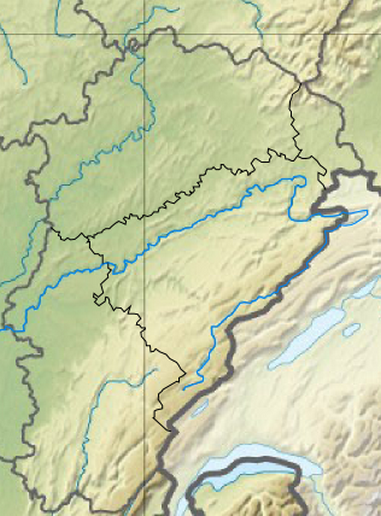
- Location within Canton of Neuchâtel Location within Franche-Comté Location within Switzerland Location within France Location within Alps
- Interactive map of Lac des Taillères
- Location: Canton of Neuchâtel
- Coordinates: 46°58′1″N 6°34′29″E
- Primary outflows: subterranean
- Basin countries: Switzerland
- Max. length: 1.9 km (1.2 mi)
- Max. width: 0.25 km (0.16 mi)
- Surface area: 0.45 km^{2} (0.17 sq mi)
- Max. depth: 7 m (23 ft)
- Surface elevation: 1,039.5 m (3,410 ft)
- Settlements: Les Taillères

Lac des Taillères (French pronunciation: [lak de tajɛʁ]) is a lake in the la Brévine valley in the Canton of Neuchâtel, Switzerland. Its surface area is 0.45 km^{2} (0.17 sq mi).

== See also ==
- List of lakes of Switzerland
- List of mountain lakes of Switzerland
