= Brot-Dessous =

- Former municipality
- Coat of arms
- Location of Brot-Dessous
- Location within Switzerland Location within Canton of Neuchâtel
- Coordinates: 46°57′N 6°45′E
- Country: Switzerland
- Canton: Neuchâtel
- District: Boudry

Area
  - Total: 5 km^{2} (1.9 sq mi)
- Elevation: 857 m (2,812 ft)

Population (December 2007)
  - Total: 90
  - Density: 18/km^{2} (47/sq mi)
- Time zone: UTC+01:00 (CET)
  - Summer (DST): UTC+02:00 (CEST)
- Postal code: 2149
- SFOS number: 6405
- ISO 3166 code: CH-NE
- Surrounded by: Boudry, Brot-Plamboz, Noiraigue, Rochefort
- Website: SFSO statistics

Brot-Dessous is a former municipality in the district of Boudry in the canton of Neuchâtel in Switzerland. On 1 January 2016 it was absorbed into Rochefort.

== History ==
Brot-Dessous is first mentioned in 998 as Broch in a document celebrating the founding of the priory of Bevaix. Between 1524 and 1730 it was part of the municipality of Rochefort.

== Geography ==
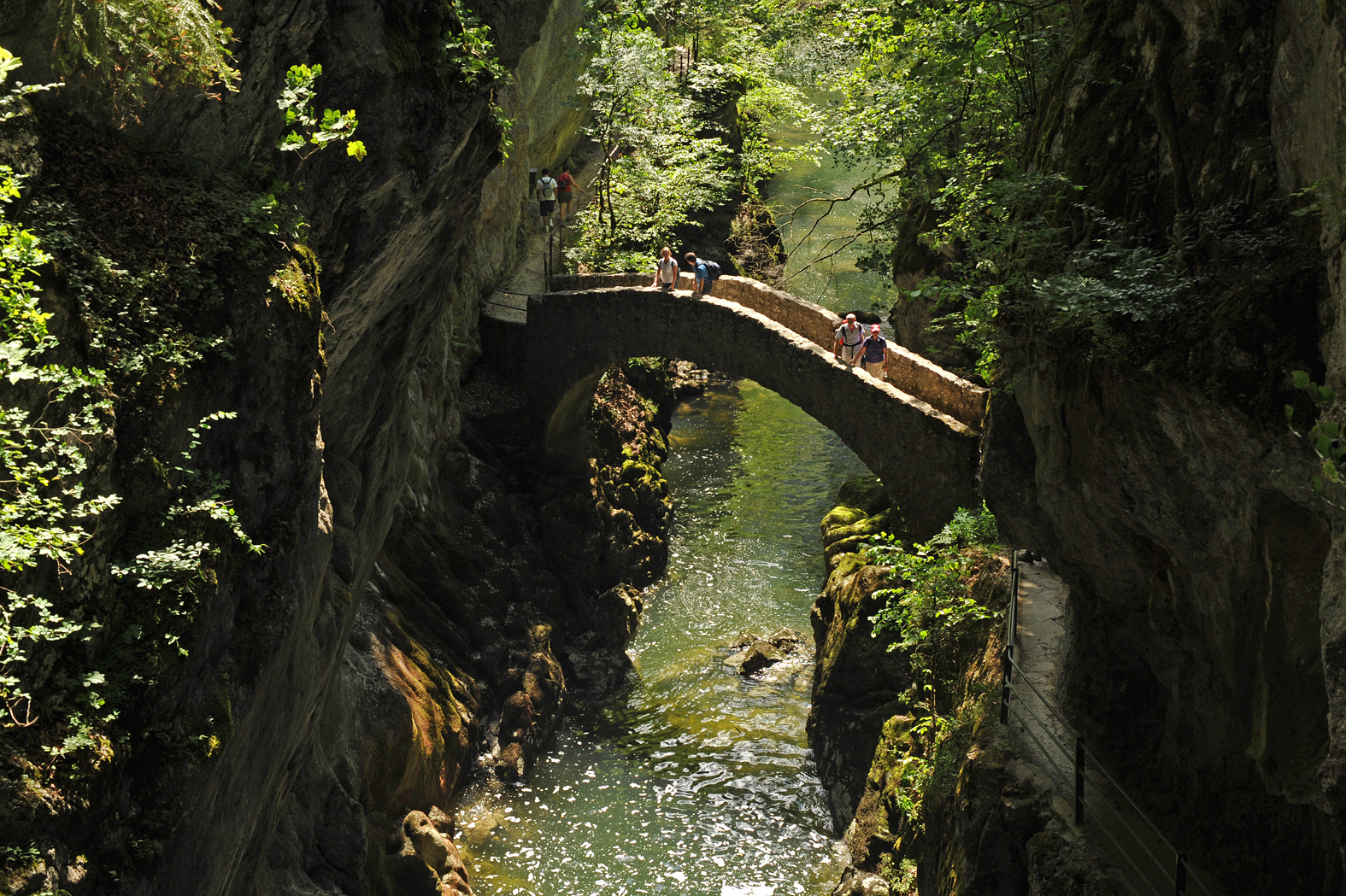
Bridge over the Areuse near Brot-Dessous

Brot-Dessous had an area, as of 2009, of 5 square kilometers (1.9 mi^{2}). Of this area, 0.62 km^{2} (0.24 mi^{2}) or 12.5% is used for agricultural purposes, while 3.92 km^{2} (1.51 mi^{2}) or 79.2% is forested. Of the rest of the land, 0.35 km^{2} (0.14 mi^{2}) or 7.1% is settled (buildings or roads), 0.01 km^{2} (2.5 acres) or 0.2% is either rivers or lakes and 0.06 km^{2} (15 acres) or 1.2% is unproductive land.

Of the built up area, housing and buildings made up 1.8% and transportation infrastructure made up 5.3%. Out of the forested land, all of the forested land area is covered with heavy forests. Of the agricultural land, 0.6% is used for growing crops and 9.9% is pastures and 2.0% is used for alpine pastures. All the water in the municipality is flowing water.

The former municipality is located in the Boudry district. The municipal borders are the Areuse river and the crest of the Solmont mountain.

== Coat of arms ==
The blazon of the municipal coat of arms is Per fess, an a mount Vert issuant a Tree of the same and a Plough Sable and Azure a Fish nainaint Argent.

== Demographics ==
Brot-Dessous had a population (as of 2014) of 98. As of 2008, 5.3% of the population are resident foreign nationals. Over the last 10 years (2000–2010 ) the population has changed at a rate of -11.3%. It has changed at a rate of -9.6% due to migration and at a rate of -3.5% due to births and deaths.

Most of the population (as of 2000) speaks French (86 or 90.5%) as their first language, German is the second most common (5 or 5.3%) and English is the third (2 or 2.1%). There is 1 person who speaks Italian.

As of 2008, the population was 49.5% male and 50.5% female. The population was made up of 44 Swiss men (45.4% of the population) and 4 (4.1%) non-Swiss men. There were 47 Swiss women (48.5%) and 2 (2.1%) non-Swiss women. Of the population in the municipality, 21 or about 22.1% were born in Brot-Dessous and lived there in 2000. There were 39 or 41.1% who were born in the same canton, while 22 or 23.2% were born somewhere else in Switzerland, and 11 or 11.6% were born outside of Switzerland.

As of 2000, children and teenagers (0–19 years old) make up 17.9% of the population, while adults (20–64 years old) make up 57.9% and seniors (over 64 years old) make up 24.2%.

As of 2000, there were 35 people who were single and never married in the municipality. There were 46 married individuals, 8 widows or widowers and 6 individuals who are divorced.

As of 2000, there were 47 private households in the municipality, and an average of 2.0 persons per household. There were 20 households that consist of only one person and 2 households with five or more people. In 2000, a total of 47 apartments (71.2% of the total) were permanently occupied, while 14 apartments (21.2%) were seasonally occupied and 5 apartments (7.6%) were empty.

The historical population is given in the following chart:

== Politics ==
In the 2007 federal election the most popular party was the SVP which received 42.8% of the vote. The next three most popular parties were the SP (18.93%), the PdA Party (11.93%) and the FDP (11.11%). In the federal election, a total of 50 votes were cast, and the voter turnout was 51.0%.

== Economy ==
As of 2010, Brot-Dessous had an unemployment rate of 9.7%. As of 2008, there were 3 people employed in the primary economic sector and about 1 business involved in this sector. 4 people were employed in the secondary sector and there were 2 businesses in this sector. No one was employed in the tertiary sector. There were 49 residents of the municipality who were employed in some capacity, of which females made up 46.9% of the workforce.

In 2008 the total number of full-time equivalent jobs was 6. The number of jobs in the primary sector was 2, both in agriculture. The number of jobs in the secondary sector was 4, of which 1 was in manufacturing.

In 2000, there were 6 workers who commuted into the municipality and 38 workers who commuted away. The municipality is a net exporter of workers, with about 6.3 workers leaving the municipality for every one entering. Of the working population, 8.2% used public transportation to get to work, and 73.5% used a private car.

== Religion ==
From the 2000 census, 22 or 23.2% were Roman Catholic, while 40 or 42.1% belonged to the Swiss Reformed Church. There was 1 individual who was Islamic. 26 (or about 27.37% of the population) belonged to no church, are agnostic or atheist, and 6 individuals (or about 6.32% of the population) did not answer the question.

== Education ==
In Brot-Dessous about 34 or (35.8%) of the population have completed non-mandatory upper secondary education, and 9 or (9.5%) have completed additional higher education (either university or a Fachhochschule). Of the 9 who completed tertiary schooling, 22.2% were Swiss men, 44.4% were Swiss women.

In the canton of Neuchâtel most municipalities provide two years of non-mandatory kindergarten, followed by five years of mandatory primary education. The next four years of mandatory secondary education is provided at thirteen larger secondary schools, which many students travel out of their home municipality to attend. Both the kindergarten and the primary school are combined with Rochefort. During the 2010-11 school year, there was one kindergarten class with a total of 16 students in shared between the two. In the same year, there were 3 primary classes with a total of 61 students.

As of 2000, there were 11 students from Brot-Dessous who attended schools outside the municipality.
