= Brot-Plamboz =

Municipality in the canton of Neuchâtel in Switzerland

- Municipality
- Coat of arms
- Location of Brot-Plamboz
- Location within Switzerland Location within Canton of Neuchâtel
- Coordinates: 46°58′N 6°44′E
- Country: Switzerland
- Canton: Neuchâtel

Area
  - Total: 16.0 km^{2} (6.2 sq mi)
- Elevation: 1,012 m (3,320 ft)

Population (December 2007)
  - Total: 265
  - Density: 16.6/km^{2} (42.9/sq mi)
- Time zone: UTC+01:00 (CET)
  - Summer (DST): UTC+02:00 (CEST)
- Postal code: 2318
- SFOS number: 6433
- ISO 3166 code: CH-NE
- Surrounded by: Brot-Dessous, La Sagne, Les Ponts-de-Martel, Montmollin, Noiraigue, Rochefort, Travers
- Website: http://www.brot-plamboz.ch SFSO statistics

Brot-Plamboz is a municipality in the canton of Neuchâtel in Switzerland.

== History ==
Brot-Plamboz is first mentioned in 998 in the founding documents of the priory of Bevaix, as Broch.

== Geography ==
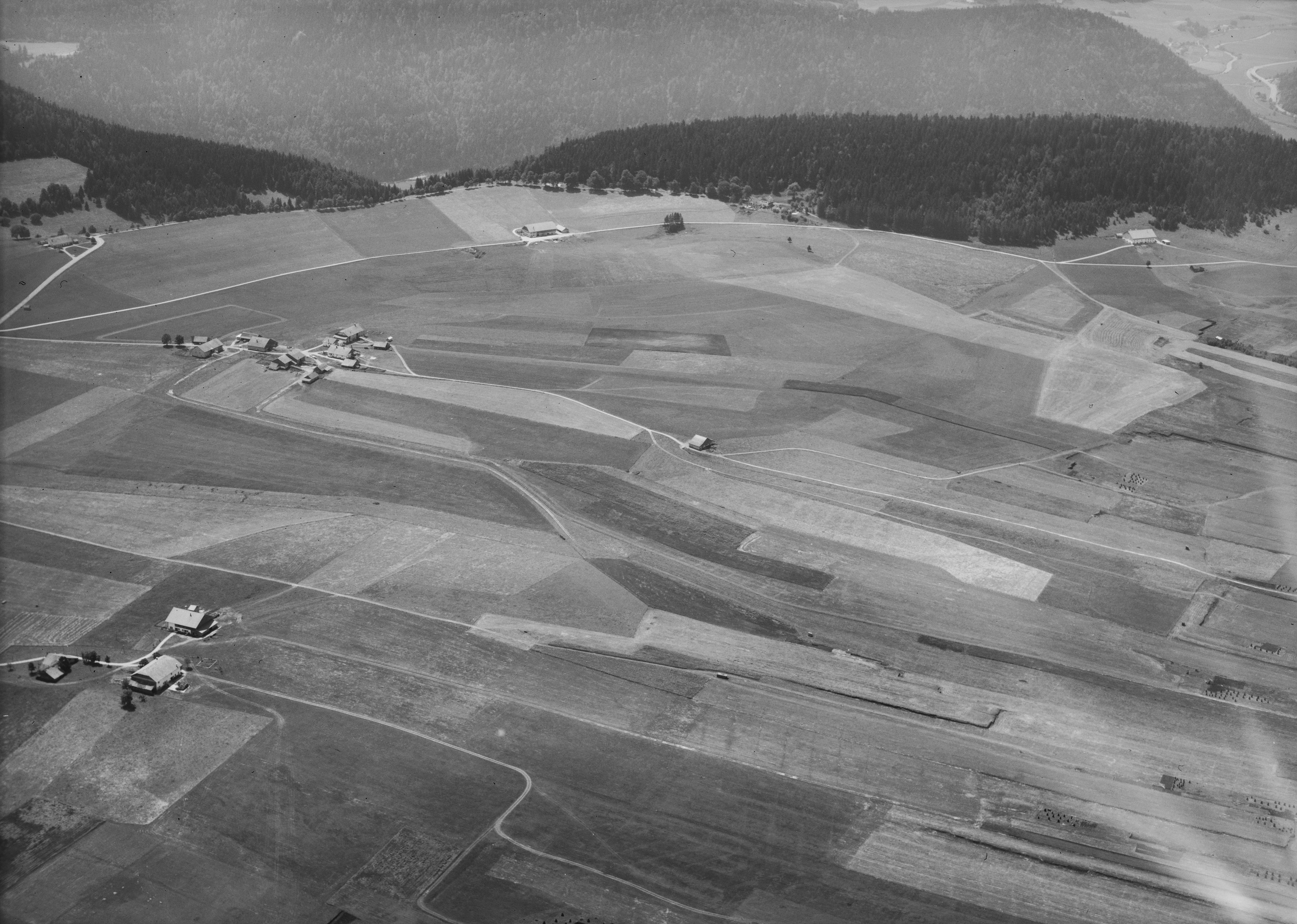
Aerial view (1964)

Brot-Plamboz has an area, as of 2009, of 16 square kilometers (6.2 mi^{2}). Of this area, 10.88 km^{2} (4.20 mi^{2}) or 67.9% is used for agricultural purposes, while 4.55 km^{2} (1.76 mi^{2}) or 28.4% is forested. Of the rest of the land, 0.43 km^{2} (0.17 mi^{2}) or 2.7% is settled (buildings or roads), 0.03 km^{2} (7.4 acres) or 0.2% is either rivers or lakes and 0.17 km^{2} (0.066 mi^{2}) or 1.1% is unproductive land.

Of the built up area, housing and buildings made up 1.4% and transportation infrastructure made up 1.2%. Out of the forested land, 25.9% of the total land area is heavily forested and 2.5% is covered with orchards or small clusters of trees. Of the agricultural land, 6.9% is used for growing crops and 50.0% is pastures and 10.9% is used for alpine pastures. All the water in the municipality is in lakes.

The municipality was located in the Le Locle district until the district level was eliminated on 1 January 2018. It was formed in 1875 when Brot-Dessus and Plamboz merged, and in 1888 when the municipal corporations of Brot-Dessus and Plamboz merged. It consists of the village of Brot-Plamboz and the hamlets of Les Petits-Ponts and Le Joratel.

== Coat of arms ==
The blazon of the municipal coat of arms is Azure, issuant from a Bridge Argent masoned Sable between the initials B and P and between a Pine tree Vert in dexter and a Peat stack Sable in sinister a Rake and a Fork in saltire crossed by a Scythe palewise all of Argent.

== Demographics ==
Brot-Plamboz has a population (as of December 2020) of 290. As of 2008, 2.7% of the population are resident foreign nationals. Over the last 10 years (2000–2010) the population has changed at a rate of -0.8%. It has changed at a rate of -6.6% due to migration and at a rate of 5.1% due to births and deaths.

Most of the population (as of 2000) speaks French (253 or 99.2%) as their first language with the rest speaking German

As of 2008, the population was 49.6% male and 50.4% female. The population was made up of 125 Swiss men (49.2% of the population) and 1 (0.4%) non-Swiss men. There were 127 Swiss women (50.0%) and 1 (0.4%) non-Swiss women. Of the population in the municipality, 126 or about 49.4% were born in Brot-Plamboz and lived there in 2000. There were 81 or 31.8% who were born in the same canton, while 30 or 11.8% were born somewhere else in Switzerland, and 13 or 5.1% were born outside of Switzerland.

As of 2000, children and teenagers (0–19 years old) make up 27.5% of the population, while adults (20–64 years old) make up 63.1% and seniors (over 64 years old) make up 9.4%.

As of 2000, there were 109 people who were single and never married in the municipality. There were 123 married individuals, 17 widows or widowers and 6 individuals who are divorced.

As of 2000, there were 94 private households in the municipality, and an average of 2.6 persons per household. There were 23 households that consist of only one person and 12 households with five or more people. In 2000, a total of 92 apartments (66.2% of the total) were permanently occupied, while 33 apartments (23.7%) were seasonally occupied and 14 apartments (10.1%) were empty.

The historical population is given in the following chart:

== Politics ==
In the 2007 federal election the most popular party was the SVP which received 29.97% of the vote. The next three most popular parties were the LPS Party (21.82%), the FDP (19.71%) and the SP (13.68%). In the federal election, a total of 124 votes were cast, and the voter turnout was 62.9%.

== Economy ==
As of 2010, Brot-Plamboz had an unemployment rate of 2.7%. As of 2008, there were 74 people employed in the primary economic sector and about 31 businesses involved in this sector. 47 people were employed in the secondary sector and there were 4 businesses in this sector. 7 people were employed in the tertiary sector, with 4 businesses in this sector. There were 149 residents of the municipality who were employed in some capacity, of which females made up 43.6% of the workforce.

In 2008 the total number of full-time equivalent jobs was 109. The number of jobs in the primary sector was 60, all of which were in agriculture. The number of jobs in the secondary sector was 43 of which 2 or (4.7%) were in manufacturing and 41 (95.3%) were in construction. The number of jobs in the tertiary sector was 6. In the tertiary sector; 4 or 66.7% were in a hotel or restaurant, 1 was a technical professional or scientist, 1 was in education.

In 2000, there were 27 workers who commuted into the municipality and 65 workers who commuted away. The municipality is a net exporter of workers, with about 2.4 workers leaving the municipality for every one entering. Of the working population, 7.4% used public transportation to get to work, and 45.6% used a private car.

== Religion ==
From the 2000 census, 23 or 9.0% were Roman Catholic, while 150 or 58.8% belonged to the Swiss Reformed Church. Of the rest of the population, there were 5 members of an Orthodox church (or about 1.96% of the population), and there were 66 individuals (or about 25.88% of the population) who belonged to another Christian church. 37 (or about 14.51% of the population) belonged to no church, are agnostic or atheist, and 7 individuals (or about 2.75% of the population) did not answer the question.

== Education ==
In Brot-Plamboz about 83 or (32.5%) of the population have completed non-mandatory upper secondary education, and 12 or (4.7%) have completed additional higher education (either university or a Fachhochschule). Of the 12 who completed tertiary schooling, 66.7% were Swiss men, 33.3% were Swiss women.

In the canton of Neuchâtel most municipalities provide two years of non-mandatory kindergarten, followed by five years of mandatory primary education. The next four years of mandatory secondary education is provided at thirteen larger secondary schools, which many students travel out of their home municipality to attend. The kindergarten in Brot-Plamboz is combined with Les Ponts-de-Martel. During the 2010-11 school year, there were 2 kindergarten classes with a total of 34 students between the municipalities. In the same year, there was one primary class with a total of 16 students.

As of 2000, there were 7 students in Brot-Plamboz who came from another municipality, while 39 residents attended schools outside the municipality.
