= La Chaux-du-Milieu =

- Municipality
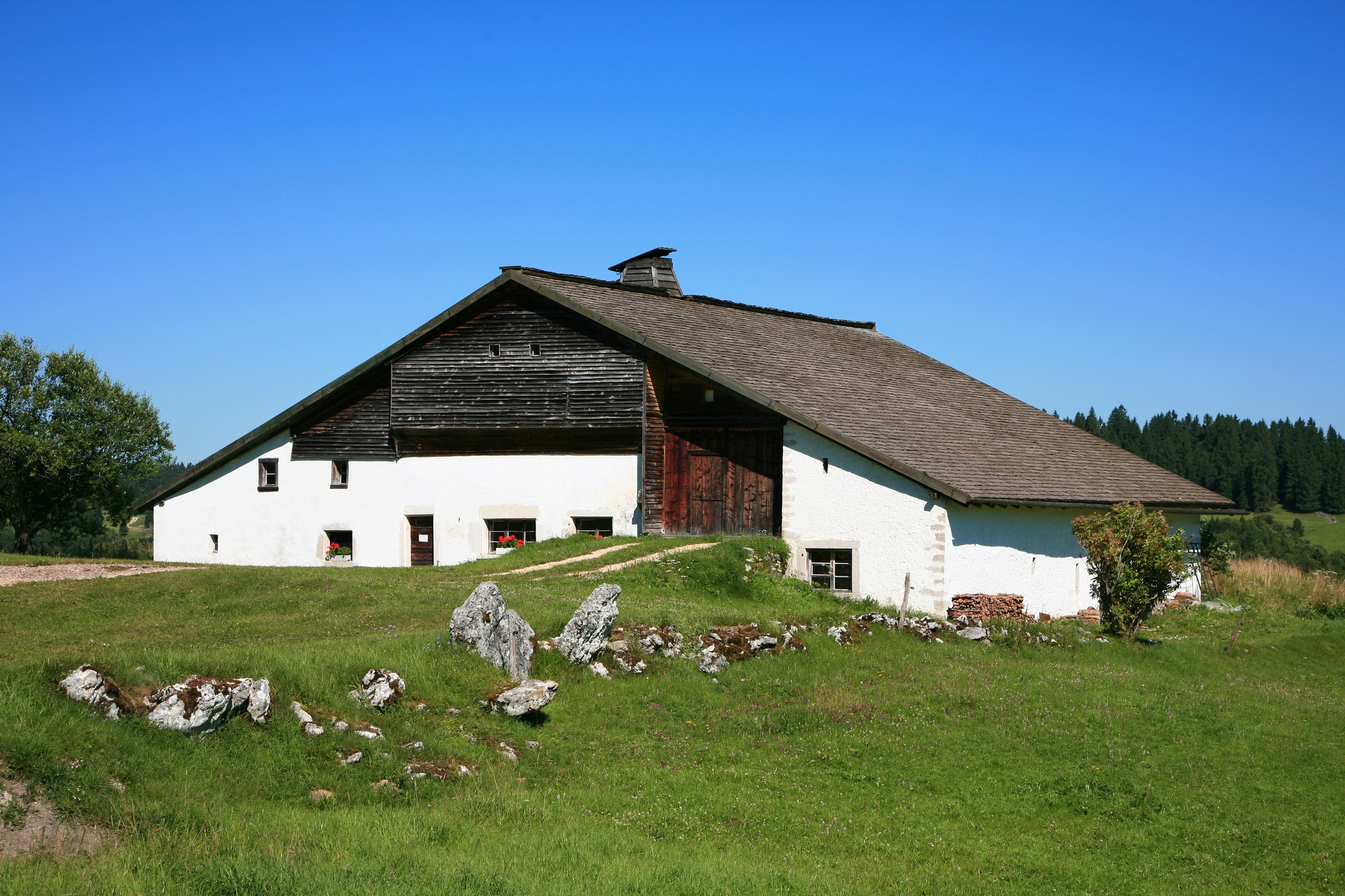
- Du Grand Cachot farmhouse near La Chaux-du-Milieu village

- Flag Coat of arms
- Location of La Chaux-du-Milieu
- Location within Switzerland Location within Canton of Neuchâtel
- Coordinates: 47°1′N 6°42′E
- Country: Switzerland
- Canton: Neuchâtel

Area
  - Total: 17.28 km^{2} (6.67 sq mi)
- Elevation: 1,081 m (3,547 ft)

Population (December 2007)
  - Total: 437
  - Density: 25.3/km^{2} (65.5/sq mi)
- Time zone: UTC+01:00 (CET)
  - Summer (DST): UTC+02:00 (CEST)
- Postal code: 2405
- SFOS number: 6435
- ISO 3166 code: CH-NE
- Surrounded by: La Brévine, Le Cerneux-Péquignot, Le Locle, Les Ponts-de-Martel
- Website: https://www.chaux-du-milieu.ch SFSO statistics

La Chaux-du-Milieu (French pronunciation: [la ʃo dy miljø]) is a municipality in the canton of Neuchâtel in Switzerland.

== History ==
La Chaux-du-Milieu is first mentioned in 1310 as calvum de Escoblon. Later it was known as Chaux de Cachot and Chaux Baussan.

== Geography ==
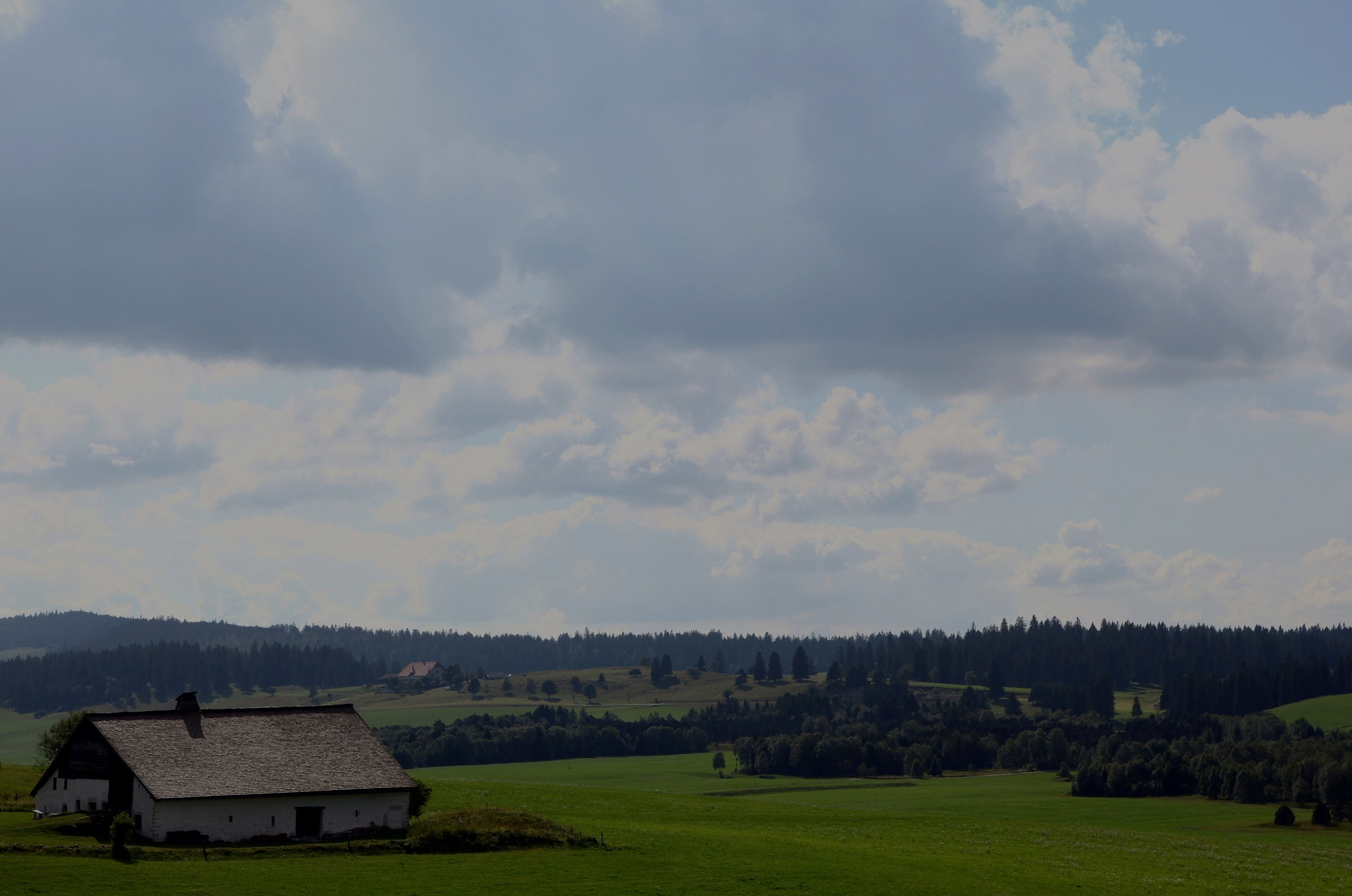
Countryside around La Chaux-du-Milieu

La Chaux-du-Milieu has an area, as of 2009, of 17.3 square kilometers (6.7 mi^{2}). Of this area, 8.49 km^{2} (3.28 mi^{2}) or 49.1% is used for agricultural purposes, while 8.35 km^{2} (3.22 mi^{2}) or 48.3% is forested. Of the rest of the land, 0.43 km^{2} (0.17 mi^{2}) or 2.5% is settled (buildings or roads) and 0.03 km^{2} (7.4 acres) or 0.2% is unproductive land.

Of the built up area, housing and buildings made up 1.2% and transportation infrastructure made up 1.1%. Out of the forested land, 45.0% of the total land area is heavily forested and 3.4% is covered with orchards or small clusters of trees. Of the agricultural land, 0.9% is used for growing crops and 28.3% is pastures and 19.9% is used for alpine pastures.

The municipality was located in the district of Le Locle until the district level was eliminated on 1 January 2018. It is in the Brévine valley.

== Coat of arms ==
The blazon of the municipal coat of arms is Argent, issuant from base Vert three Pine trees of the same, and in chief a Crow volant Sable.

== Demographics ==
La Chaux-du-Milieu has a population (as of December 2020) of 514. As of 2008, 3.4% of the population are resident foreign nationals. Over the last 10 years (2000–2010 ) the population has changed at a rate of 9.3%. It has changed at a rate of 2.4% due to migration and at a rate of 6.1% due to births and deaths.

Most of the population (as of 2000) speaks French (389 or 97.7%) as their first language, German is the second most common (4 or 1.0%) and Serbo-Croatian is the third (2 or 0.5%). There is 1 person who speaks Italian.

As of 2008, the population was 50.2% male and 49.8% female. The population was made up of 225 Swiss men (48.5% of the population) and 8 (1.7%) non-Swiss men. There were 221 Swiss women (47.6%) and 10 (2.2%) non-Swiss women. Of the population in the municipality, 168 or about 42.2% were born in La Chaux-du-Milieu and lived there in 2000. There were 163 or 41.0% who were born in the same canton, while 40 or 10.1% were born somewhere else in Switzerland, and 22 or 5.5% were born outside of Switzerland.

As of 2000, children and teenagers (0–19 years old) make up 27.6% of the population, while adults (20–64 years old) make up 58.8% and seniors (over 64 years old) make up 13.6%.

As of 2000, there were 164 people who were single and never married in the municipality. There were 211 married individuals, 15 widows or widowers and 8 individuals who are divorced.

As of 2000, there were 144 private households in the municipality, and an average of 2.7 persons per household. There were 34 households that consist of only one person and 20 households with five or more people. In 2000, a total of 144 apartments (78.7% of the total) were permanently occupied, while 26 apartments (14.2%) were seasonally occupied and 13 apartments (7.1%) were empty. As of 2009, the construction rate of new housing units was 2.2 new units per 1000 residents.

The historical population is given in the following chart:

== Heritage sites of national significance ==
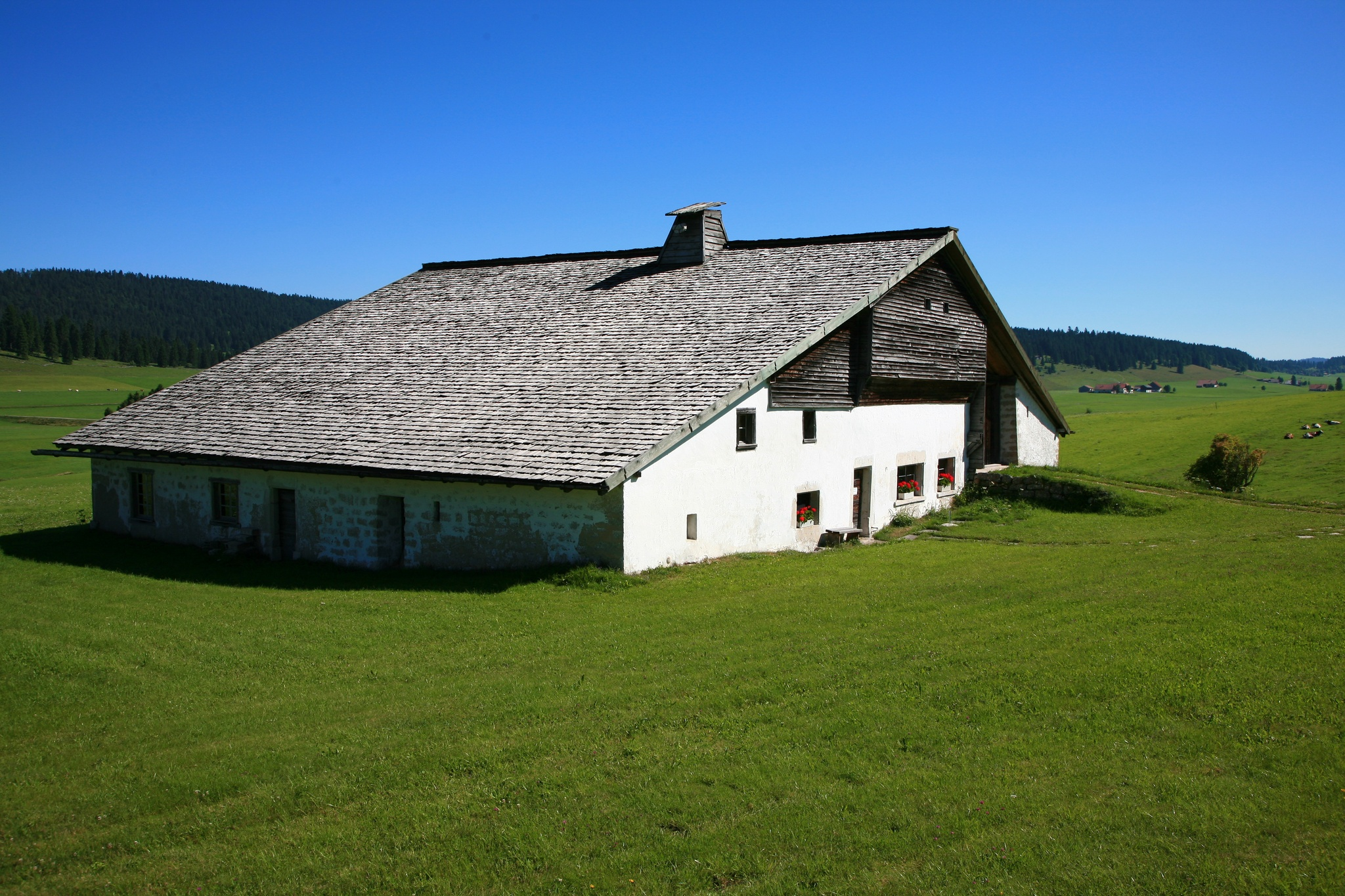
Farm House Du Grand Cachot

The Farm House Du Grand Cachot is listed as a Swiss heritage site of national significance.

== Politics ==
In the 2007 federal election the most popular party was the SP which received 23.25% of the vote. The next three most popular parties were the LPS Party (19.3%), the SVP (18.85%) and the FDP (14.45%). In the federal election, a total of 182 votes were cast, and the voter turnout was 56.5%.

== Economy ==
As of 2010, La Chaux-du-Milieu had an unemployment rate of 2.9%. As of 2008, there were 78 people employed in the primary economic sector and about 28 businesses involved in this sector. 29 people were employed in the secondary sector and there were 6 businesses in this sector. 34 people were employed in the tertiary sector, with 11 businesses in this sector. There were 203 residents of the municipality who were employed in some capacity, of which females made up 42.9% of the workforce.

In 2008 the total number of full-time equivalent jobs was 100. The number of jobs in the primary sector was 57, of which 48 were in agriculture and 9 were in forestry or lumber production. The number of jobs in the secondary sector was 22 of which 19 or (86.4%) were in manufacturing and 3 (13.6%) were in construction. The number of jobs in the tertiary sector was 21. In the tertiary sector; 3 or 14.3% were in wholesale or retail sales or the repair of motor vehicles, 3 or 14.3% were in the movement and storage of goods, 5 or 23.8% were in a hotel or restaurant, 4 or 19.0% were in the information industry, 3 or 14.3% were technical professionals or scientists, 3 or 14.3% were in education and 1 was in health care.

In 2000, there were 32 workers who commuted into the municipality and 117 workers who commuted away. The municipality is a net exporter of workers, with about 3.7 workers leaving the municipality for every one entering. About 25.0% of the workforce coming into La Chaux-du-Milieu are coming from outside Switzerland. Of the working population, 8.9% used public transportation to get to work, and 53.2% used a private car.

== Religion ==
From the 2000 census, 93 or 23.4% were Roman Catholic, while 229 or 57.5% belonged to the Swiss Reformed Church. Of the rest of the population, there were 10 individuals (or about 2.51% of the population) who belonged to another Christian church. There were 2 (or about 0.50% of the population) who were Islamic. There were 5 individuals who belonged to another church. 50 (or about 12.56% of the population) belonged to no church, are agnostic or atheist, and 14 individuals (or about 3.52% of the population) did not answer the question.

== Education ==
In La Chaux-du-Milieu about 140 or (35.2%) of the population have completed non-mandatory upper secondary education, and 29 or (7.3%) have completed additional higher education (either university or a Fachhochschule). Of the 29 who completed tertiary schooling, 69.0% were Swiss men, 24.1% were Swiss women.

In the canton of Neuchâtel most municipalities provide two years of non-mandatory kindergarten, followed by five years of mandatory primary education. The next four years of mandatory secondary education is provided at thirteen larger secondary schools, which many students travel out of their home municipality to attend. During the 2010-11 school year, there was one kindergarten class with a total of 18 students in La Chaux-du-Milieu. In the same year, there were 2 primary classes with a total of 39 students.

As of 2000, there were 20 students in La Chaux-du-Milieu who came from another municipality, while 49 residents attended schools outside the municipality.
