= Les Ponts-de-Martel =

- Municipality
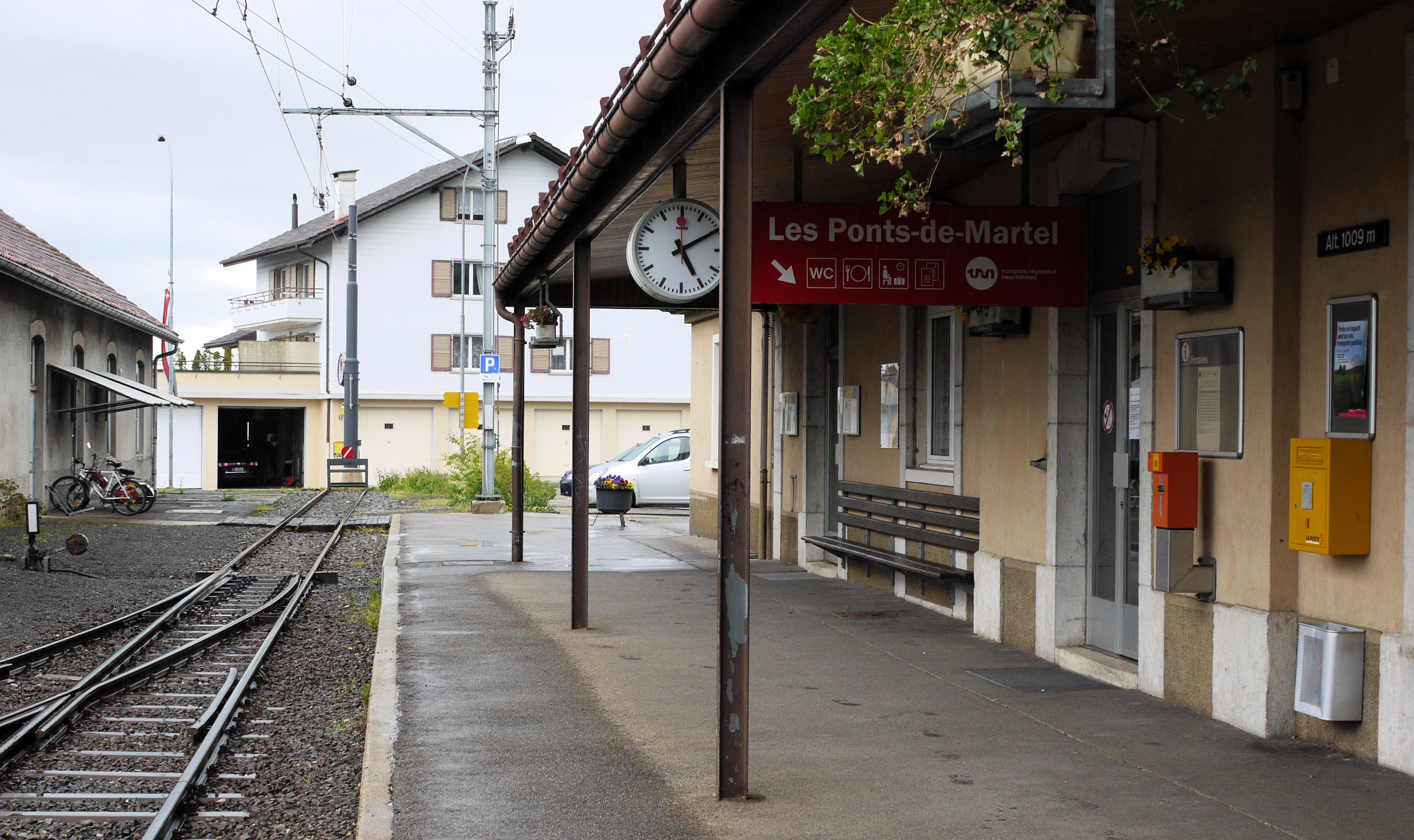
- Les Ponts-de-Martel train station

- Coat of arms
- Location of Les Ponts-de-Martel
- Location within Switzerland Location within Canton of Neuchâtel
- Coordinates: 47°0′N 6°44′E
- Country: Switzerland
- Canton: Neuchâtel

Area
  - Total: 18.23 km^{2} (7.04 sq mi)
- Elevation: 1,009 m (3,310 ft)

Population (December 2007)
  - Total: 1,277
  - Density: 70.05/km^{2} (181.4/sq mi)
- Time zone: UTC+01:00 (CET)
  - Summer (DST): UTC+02:00 (CEST)
- Postal code: 2316
- SFOS number: 6437
- ISO 3166 code: CH-NE
- Surrounded by: Brot-Plamboz, La Brévine, La Chaux-du-Milieu, La Sagne, Le Locle, Travers
- Website: www.lesponts-de-martel.ch

Les Ponts-de-Martel (Arpitan: Les Ponts-de-Mouartél) is a municipality in the canton of Neuchâtel in Switzerland.

== History ==
Les Ponts-de-Martel is first mentioned in 1360 as Martel.

== Geography ==
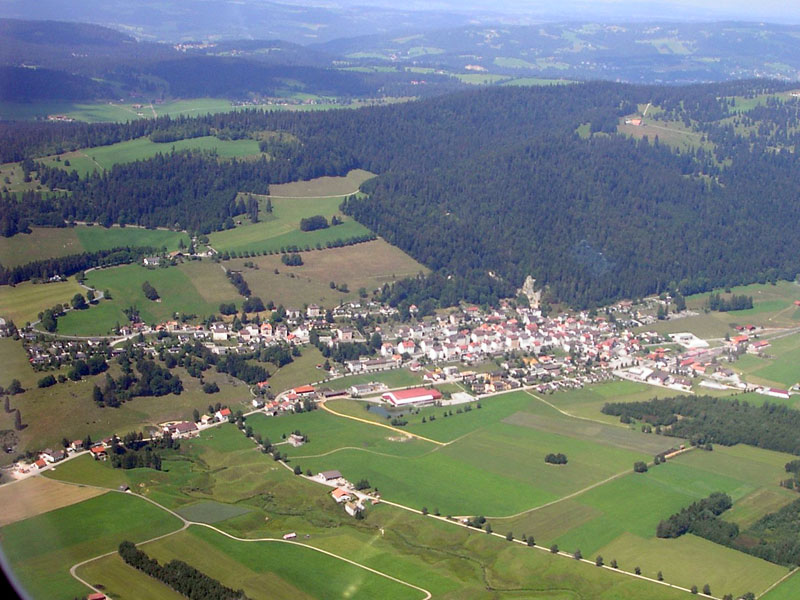
Aerial view of Les Ponts-de-Martel

Aerial view (1964)

Les Ponts-de-Martel has an area, as of 2009, of 18.2 square kilometers (7.0 mi^{2}). Of this area, 10.8 km^{2} (4.2 mi^{2}) or 59.2% is used for agricultural purposes, while 5.56 km^{2} (2.15 mi^{2}) or 30.5% is forested. Of the rest of the land, 0.85 km^{2} (0.33 mi^{2}) or 4.7% is settled (buildings or roads), 0.07 km^{2} (17 acres) or 0.4% is either rivers or lakes and 0.97 km^{2} (0.37 mi^{2}) or 5.3% is unproductive land.

Of the built-up area, housing and buildings made up 2.2% and transportation infrastructure made up 1.6%. Out of the forested land, 27.1% of the total land area is heavily forested and 3.4% is covered with orchards or small clusters of trees. Of the agricultural land, 3.8% is used for growing crops and 39.9% is pastures and 15.5% is used for alpine pastures. All the water in the municipality is flowing water.

The municipality was located in the district of Le Locle until the district level was eliminated on 1 January 2018. It is on the north side of the Vallée de la Sagne et des Ponts. It consists of the village of Les Ponts-de-Martel and the hamlets of Martel-Dernier and Petit-Martel. The settlement of Le Joratel went to the municipality of Brot-Plamboz in 1920.

== Coat of arms ==
The blazon of the municipal coat of arms is Per fess, Azure a Bridge Argent and Gules a Hammer Or in bend sinistre.

== Demographics ==
Les Ponts-de-Martel has a population (as of December 2020) of 1,230. As of 2008, 6.5% of the population are resident foreign nationals. Over the last 10 years (2000–2010) the population has changed at a rate of 1%. It has changed at a rate of 0.2% due to migration and at a rate of 1.1% due to births and deaths.

Most of the population (as of 2000) speaks French (1,215 or 93.7%) as their first language, German is the second most common (47 or 3.6%) and Albanian is the third (7 or 0.5%). There are 6 people who speak Italian and 1 person who speaks Romansh.

As of 2008, the population was 48.7% male and 51.3% female. The population was made up of 565 Swiss men (44.7% of the population) and 51 (4.0%) non-Swiss men. There were 610 Swiss women (48.2%) and 39 (3.1%) non-Swiss women. Of the population in the municipality, 604 or about 46.6% were born in Les Ponts-de-Martel and lived there in 2000. There were 373 or 28.8% who were born in the same canton, while 174 or 13.4% were born somewhere else in Switzerland, and 102 or 7.9% were born outside of Switzerland.

As of 2000, children and teenagers (0–19 years old) make up 27% of the population, while adults (20–64 years old) make up 53.3% and seniors (over 64 years old) make up 19.7%.

As of 2000, there were 532 people who were single and never married in the municipality. There were 601 married individuals, 110 widows or widowers and 54 individuals who are divorced.

As of 2000, there were 497 private households in the municipality, and an average of 2.4 persons per household. There were 155 households that consist of only one person and 60 households with five or more people. In 2000, a total of 482 apartments (82.7% of the total) were permanently occupied, while 56 apartments (9.6%) were seasonally occupied and 45 apartments (7.7%) were empty. The vacancy rate for the municipality, in 2010, was 0.67%.

The historical population is given in the following chart:

== Politics ==
In the 2007 federal election the most popular party was the SVP which received 30.81% of the vote. The next three most popular parties were the SP (21.3%), the LPS Party (17.23%) and the FDP (10.89%). In the federal election, a total of 560 votes were cast, and the voter turnout was 59.4%.

== Peat cutting ==
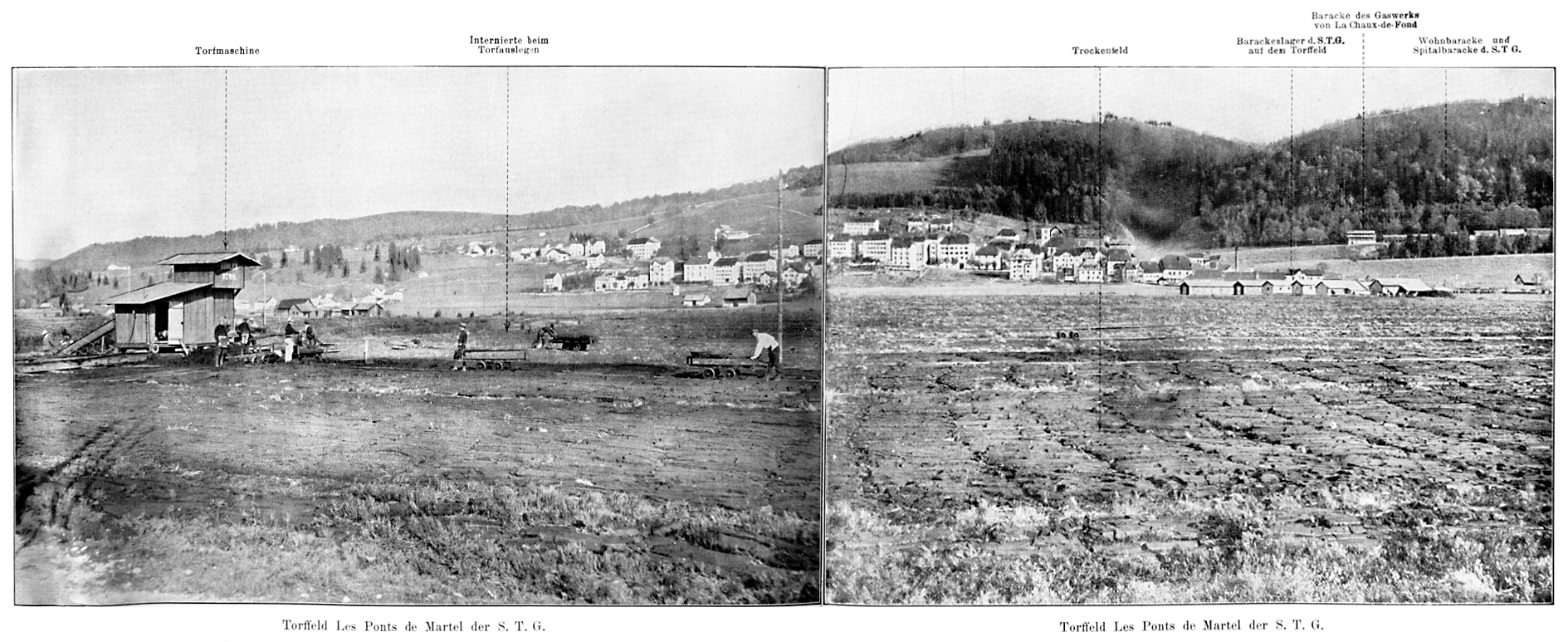
Peat field Les Ponts de Martel of S. T. G.

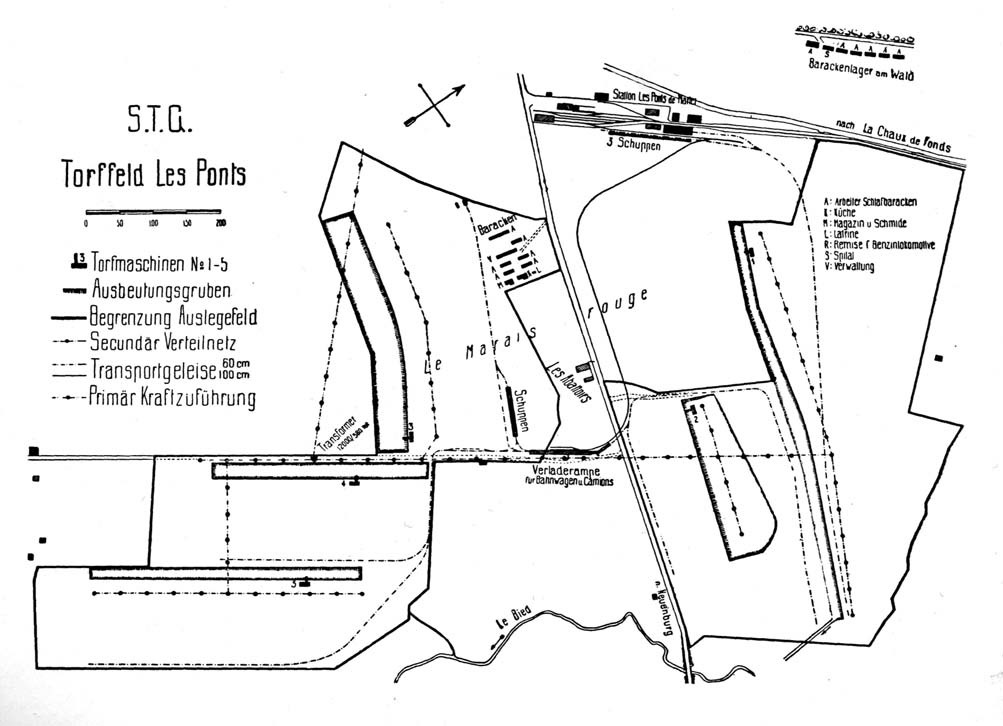
Map published on 25 July 1923

From 1917 onwards, the Swiss Peat Co-operative (Schweizerische Torfgenossenschaft, S. T. G.) exploited the 50 hectares of peatland leased from the Société Anonyme des Marais des Ponts near Les Ponts-de-Martel. The narrow gauge railway tracks with a gauge of 600 mm (1 ft 11 5/8 in)} were partly made from portable Decauville rails, partly from permanent rails on wooden sleepers. Their length was about 3,000 metres (1.9 mi), to which were added about 650 metres (0.40 mi) of fixed tracks at the station, in the sheds and on the loading ramp. The transports from the dry fields to the loading ramp and to the peat sheds were done by hand in 1918–1919. In 1920, to increase efficiency, a 600 mm gauge tractor with an Austro-Daimler petrol engine was purchased, for which a small shed was built on the peat field. There was also a 1,000 mm (3 ft 3 3/8 in) gauge peat railway with 110 millimetres (4.3 in) high rails on wooden sleepers. It had a maximum gradient of 15% and minimum radii of 70 metres (230 ft). Its length, including a 50 m-long (160 ft) siding at the loading ramp, was 750 m (2,460 ft).

== Economy ==
As of 2010, Les Ponts-de-Martel had an unemployment rate of 4.1%. As of 2008, there were 82 people employed in the primary economic sector and about 36 businesses involved in this sector. 91 people were employed in the secondary sector and there were 24 businesses in this sector. 271 people were employed in the tertiary sector, with 46 businesses in this sector. There were 591 residents of the municipality who were employed in some capacity, of which females made up 43.5% of the workforce.

In 2008 the total number of full-time equivalent jobs was 358. The number of jobs in the primary sector was 68, of which 67 were in agriculture and 1 was in forestry or lumber production. The number of jobs in the secondary sector was 79 of which 42 or (53.2%) were in manufacturing and 37 (46.8%) were in construction. The number of jobs in the tertiary sector was 211. In the tertiary sector; 73 or 34.6% were in wholesale or retail sales or the repair of motor vehicles, 24 or 11.4% were in the movement and storage of goods, 8 or 3.8% were in a hotel or restaurant, 1 was in the information industry, 3 or 1.4% were the insurance or financial industry, 5 or 2.4% were technical professionals or scientists, 17 or 8.1% were in education and 69 or 32.7% were in health care.

In 2000, there were 265 workers who commuted into the municipality and 278 workers who commuted away. The municipality is a net exporter of workers, with about 1.0 workers leaving the municipality for everyone entering. About 24.9% of the workforce coming into Les Ponts-de-Martel are coming from outside Switzerland. Of the working population, 11.7% used public transportation to get to work, and 51.1% used a private car.

== Religion ==
From the 2000 census, 121 or 9.3% were Roman Catholic, while 748 or 57.7% belonged to the Swiss Reformed Church. Of the rest of the population, there were 2 members of an Orthodox church (or about 0.15% of the population), there were 3 individuals (or about 0.23% of the population) who belonged to the Christian Catholic Church, and there were 291 individuals (or about 22.44% of the population) who belonged to another Christian church. There were 9 (or about 0.69% of the population) who were Islamic. There were 4 individuals who were Buddhist and 5 individuals who belonged to another church. 213 (or about 16.42% of the population) belonged to no church, are agnostic or atheist, and 45 individuals (or about 3.47% of the population) did not answer the question.

== Education ==
In Les Ponts-de-Martel about 472 or (36.4%) of the population have completed non-mandatory upper secondary education, and 111 or (8.6%) have completed additional higher education (either university or a Fachhochschule). Of the 111 who completed tertiary schooling, 64.9% were Swiss men, 20.7% were Swiss women, 9.0% were non-Swiss men and 5.4% were non-Swiss women.

In the canton of Neuchâtel most municipalities provide two years of non-mandatory kindergarten, followed by five years of mandatory primary education. The next four years of mandatory secondary education is provided at thirteen larger secondary schools, which many students travel out of their home municipality to attend. The kindergarten in Les Ponts-de-Martel is combined with Brot-Plamboz. During the 2010–11 school year, there were 2 kindergarten classes with a total of 34 students between the municipalities. In the same year, there were 5 primary classes with a total of 87 students.

As of 2000, there were 61 students in Les Ponts-de-Martel who came from another municipality, while 53 residents attended schools outside the municipality.

== Notable people ==
- Georges Schneider (1925–1963), a Swiss alpine skier, competed at the 1948, 1952, 1956 and 1960 Winter Olympics
- Louis Zutter (1865–1946) was a Swiss gymnast
- This is the original home of the Swiss watchmaker Mathey-Tissot.
