= Grand'Combe-Châteleu =

- Commune
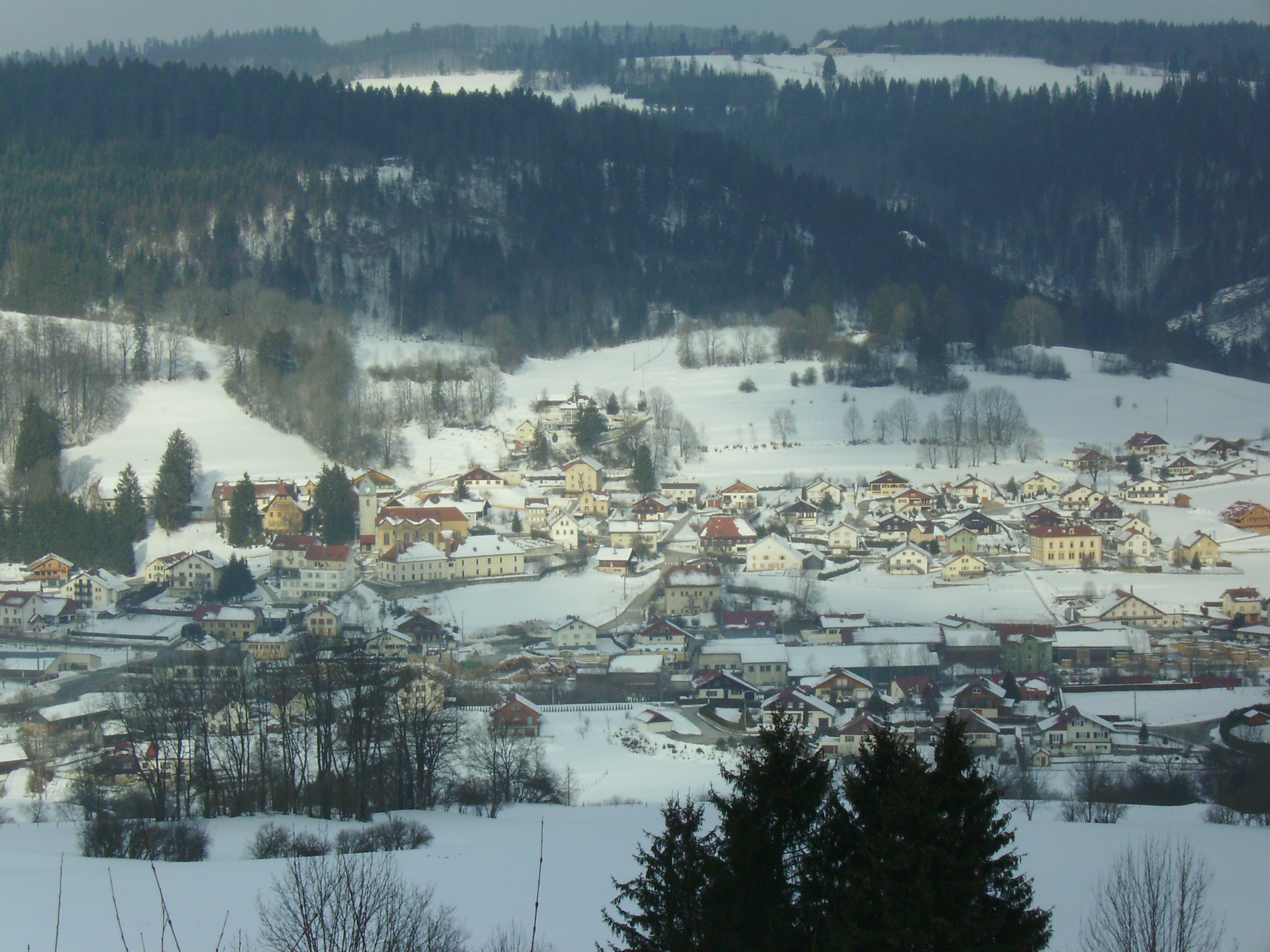
- A general view of Grand'Combe-Châteleu

- Coat of arms
- Location of Grand'Combe-Châteleu
- Location within France Location within Bourgogne-Franche-Comté
- Coordinates: 47°01′37″N 6°34′14″E
- Country: France
- Region: Bourgogne-Franche-Comté
- Department: Doubs
- Arrondissement: Pontarlier
- Canton: Morteau
- Intercommunality: Val de Morteau

Government
  - Mayor (2023–2026): Christelle Vuillemin
- Area^{1}: 21.46 km^{2} (8.29 sq mi)
- Highest elevation: 1,300 m (4,300 ft)
- Lowest elevation: 750 m (2,460 ft)
- Population (2023): 1,491
  - Density: 69.48/km^{2} (179.9/sq mi)
- Time zone: UTC+01:00 (CET)
  - Summer (DST): UTC+02:00 (CEST)
- INSEE/Postal code: 25285 /25570
- ^{1} French Land Register data, which excludes lakes, ponds, glaciers > 1 km^{2} (0.386 sq mi or 247 acres) and river estuaries.

Grand'Combe-Châteleu (French pronunciation: [ɡʁɑ̃kɔ̃b ʃatlø]) is a commune in the Doubs department in the Bourgogne-Franche-Comté region in eastern France.

== Population ==
Historical population
Year	Pop.	±% p.a.
1968	1,112	—
1975	1,124	+0.15%
1982	1,199	+0.93%
1990	1,301	+1.03%
1999	1,266	−0.30%
2007	1,346	+0.77%
2012	1,401	+0.80%
2017	1,489	+1.23%
2023	1,491	+0.02%
Source: INSEE

== See also ==
- Communes of the Doubs department
