= Le Reymond railway station =

Railway station in La Chaux-de-Fonds, Switzerland

Le Reymond
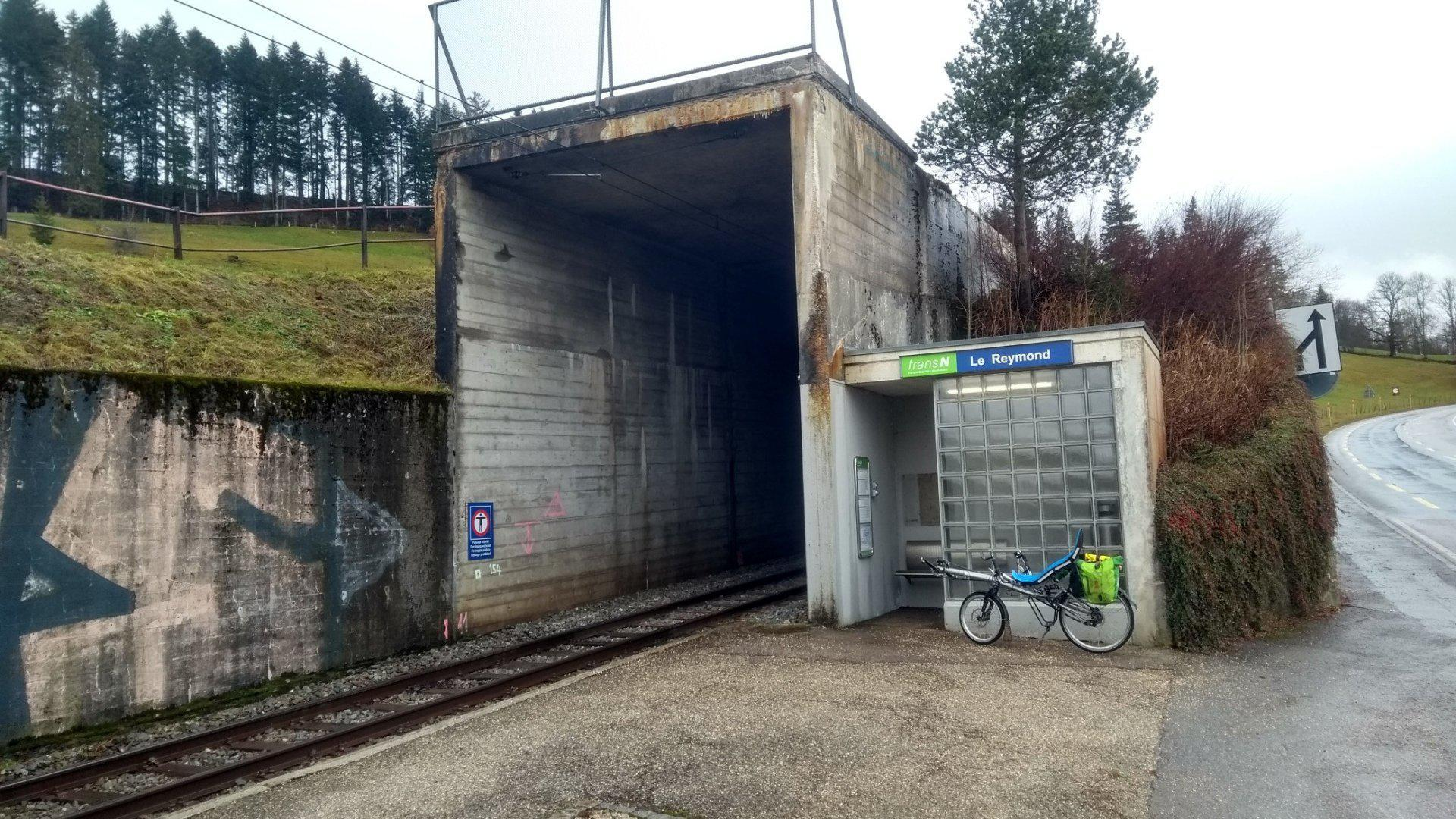
- The station in 2018

General information
- Location: La Chaux-de-Fonds; Switzerland
- Coordinates: 47°05′13″N 6°50′38″E
- Elevation: 1,066 m (3,497 ft)
- Owner: Transports publics Neuchâtelois
- Line: La Chaux-de-Fonds–Les Ponts-de-Martel line
- Distance: 2.3 km (1.4 mi) from La Chaux-de-Fonds
- Platforms: 1 side platform
- Tracks: 1
- Train operators: Transports publics Neuchâtelois

Construction
- Accessible: No

Other information
- Station code: 8504382 (REYM)
- Fare zone: 20 (Onde Verte)

Services
Preceding station	Transports publics Neuchâtelois	Following station
La Corbatière towards Les Ponts-de-Martel	R22	La Chaux-de-Fonds-Grenier towards La Chaux-de-Fonds
Location
- Location within Switzerland Location within Canton of Neuchâtel

Le Reymond railway station (French: Gare de Le Reymond) is a railway station in the municipality of La Chaux-de-Fonds, in the Swiss canton of Neuchâtel. It is an intermediate stop and a request stop on the 1,000 mm (3 ft 3 3/8 in) La Chaux-de-Fonds–Les Ponts-de-Martel line of Transports publics Neuchâtelois.

== Services ==
As of the December 2023 timetable change, the following services stop at Le Reymond:

- Regio: hourly service between Les Ponts-de-Martel and La Chaux-de-Fonds.
