= Michaelsberg =

Michaelsberg may refer to:

== Mountains in Baden-Württemberg, Germany ==
- Michaelsberg (Cleebronn)
- Michaelsberg (Gundelsheim)
- Michaelsberg (Untergrombach)

== Religious buildings ==
- Michaelsberg Abbey, Bamberg, Bavaria
- Michaelsberg Abbey, Siegburg, North Rhine-Westphalia

== See also ==
- Michelsberg (disambiguation)
