= Michelsberg =

Michelsberg or Michaelsberg may refer to:

== Hills and mountains in Germany ==
- Michelsberg (Albtrauf), part of the Albtrauf escarpment in the Swabian Alps, Germany
- Michelsberg (Eifel), a hill in Bad Münstereifel, Euskirchen, North Rhine-Westphalia, Germany
- Michelsberg (Kelheim), a hill in the town of Kelheim, Bavaria, Germany
- Michaelsberg (Untergrombach) (Michelsberg), a hill at Untergrombach near Bruchsal in Baden-Württemberg, Germany
- A hill in Bad Überkingen), Göppingen, Baden-Württemberg, Germany
- A hill near Münnerstadt, Bad Kissingen, Bavaria, Germany
- A hill in Fläming Heath, Wittenberg district, Saxony-Anhalt, Germany

== Settlements ==
- Michelsberg (Nittenau), a village in Nittenau, Schwandorf, Germany
- A village in Schwalmstadt, North Hesse, Germany
- A quarter of Ulm in Baden-Württemberg, Germany; see Ulm campaign
- A village in Bad Überkingen), Göppingen, Baden-Württemberg, Germany
- Myjomice (German: Michelsberg), a village in Gmina Kępno, Greater Poland Voivodeship, Poland
- Cisnădioara German: Michelsberg, a village in Sibiu, Romania

== Other uses ==
- Michelsberg (Großlage), a wine region in Bernkastel, Mosel
- Michelsberg Abbey, a spelling variant of Michaelsberg Abbey, Bamberg, Bavaria, Germany
- Michelsberg culture, a New Stone Age culture in Central Europe
- Frutolf of Michelsberg (died 1103), monk and prior at Michelsberg Abbey, Bamberg, Germany
- Ouvrage Michelsberg, an artillery bunker on the Maginot Line in France

== See also ==
- Michaelsberg (disambiguation)
