= Niedertiefenbach (megalithic tomb) =

Neolithic tomb in Hesse, Germany

Coordinates: 50°25′51″N 8°07′42″E

The Niedertiefenbach tomb (German: Steinkistengrab von Niedertiefenbach) is a megalithic tomb located near Beselich-Niedertiefebach in Hesse, Germany. It belongs to the Wartberg culture of the Central European Later Neolithic. It is of special importance in Central European prehistory because of the sequence of collective burial layers contained within it.

== Location ==
The tomb, or gallery grave, is located on a slight rise near the village of Niedertiefenbach, about 2 km north of the river Lahn. Visible from the tomb is the hill of Steeden which bore a prehistoric Rössen culture settlement and contained at least two caves with prehistoric activity. The Steeden sites have all been destroyed by quarrying. Similarly, no trace of the tomb is visible in situ.

== Date ==
The tomb belongs to the Hessian-Westphalian stone cist group (Hessisch-Westfälische Steinkistengruppe), which is part of the Wartberg culture. It dates to before 3000 BC but was in use for several generations, straddling the 4th and 3rd millennia.

== Discovery and excavation ==
The site was first noticed and identified as a prehistoric monument by K. Rossel in 1859. In 1874, the southern part of the monument was blown up, probably because it was inconvenient for agriculture. Much human bone material was removed at that time. The tomb was rediscovered by H. Wurm in 1961, and excavated in the same year by H. Schoppa.

== Tomb architecture ==
Despite the late 19th century damage, the overall size of the tomb can be estimated at 10 by 3.2 m (outside measurements). Unusually among the Wartberg tombs, it was oriented north–south. The tomb was built of unworked limestone slabs (0.3 to 0.8 m thick) from Steeden (2 km to the south). The relatively large gaps between the slabs were filled with drystone walling (a feature well known from gallery graves elsewhere in Europe, but not familiar within the Lahn and Kassel basin groups of tombs). Its height can be determined, as the tops of the orthostaths had not been destroyed by ploughing; it was low, at 0.8 to 0.88 m. In 1859, one slab remained of the ceiling. It is not clear whether the ceiling was entirely of stone, or a mixture of stone, wood and other materials. It is similarly unclear whether it was built in a pit (like its counterparts in the general region) and whether it was once covered by a mound.

== Tomb interior ==
The final 2.7 m of the chamber, near the north end, is set off as a separate compartment by two vertically set slabs, leaving a 60 cm gap in the middle. The chamber formed by these slabs had two unconnected areas of cobbled floor, one of larger slabs in the west, and one of rubble in the east. Two postholes set in front of the back wall might indicate internal supports for a ceiling.

The state of the skeletons recovered, all of them inarticulate or only partially articulate, placed in a sequence of distinct layers, indicates that the dead were either allowed to decay partially outside the tomb (excarnation), or that their remains were reorganised after partial or complete decomposition within the tomb. It is doubtful whether the bodies entered the tomb through its entrance, as the uppermost levels of burials are only 30 cm under the top of the orthostaths. The same doubt has been raised on different grounds, namely the narrow Seelenloch entrances, at Züschen, Lohra and Altendorf.

== Sequence ==
Careful excavation in the undestroyed part of the tomb revealed ten discernible layers of burials (numbered 1–10 in the order of discovery from the top down, i.e. the reverse to the order of deposition), most of them consisting of disarticulate, often sorted, groups of bones. The ten layers could be grouped in three phases.

Phase 1 (layers 10–7): Layer 10a, on the floor of the chamber, included a pyramid of bones (six skulls mixed with short and long bones, including the near-complete skeleton of a child), as well as a pair of legs lying parallel to the chamber. Layer 10 had two articulated skeletons, lying on their back with their arms crossed on the chest, at right angles to the chamber. Layer 9 consisted of several caches of longbones, mostly parallel to the chamber, and the bottom halves of three articulated skeletons at right angles to the chamber. Layer 8 contained three badly preserved, but articulate, skeletons, this time parallel to the chamber, again with the arms crossed over the body. Layer 7 had inarticulate bone remains mixed with many stones; it was separated from layer 6 above it by a deposit of earth. It included a skull accompanied by a flint knife.

Phase 2 (layers 6–3): Layer 6 was also quite mixed, but had a grouping of long bones in the north, a nest of five skulls and a copper spiral further south, as well as individual skull set off by a stone setting. Also in layer 6, a row of skulls running across the chamber near the partition wall was started, which contained through 5 and 4a. Layers 5 and 4 appear to follow a different pattern from previous practice. Apart from the above-mentioned row, skulls are mainly placed along the west, bones to the east, long bones in the north and parallel to the chamber. Most of the copper and amber finds were from these layers. They were covered with a paving-like deposit of large carefully placed limestone slabs.

Phase 3 (layers 2–1): Layer 2, on top of the limestone slabs, contained three skulls and two partially articulated lower bodies, parallel to the chamber, as well as some long bones. Layer 1, the top of the burial deposit, had a mixture of short and long bones spread all over the excavated area, as well as more than fifteen skulls.

== Anthropology ==
An anthrolopological study of the remains was undertaken. The minimum numbers calculated from the 1961 material reflect only part of the original deposit, as the 19th century disturbance probably removed much of the originally present bone materials.

No complete skeletons were found, but the bones encountered were quite well preserved. On the basis of the thighbones, there were 60 male adults, 53 female adults, 11 youths over 14, 10 children over 7, 29 children under 7 and 14 further individuals of undeterminable age; i.e. a total of 177. The males had an average height of 1.68 m, the females of 1.53 m. One adult, and one young child, displayed signs of violent injury with a tool.

== Finds ==
=== Pottery ===
Virtually no pottery was found.

=== Stone tools ===
Two flint arrowheads and a scraper were found on the bottom of the tomb, and a further flint knife in layer 7. The tomb also contained some flint chippings.

=== Bone ===
The amount of animal bone found was unusually low. There were fifteen bones and three teeth of cattle, one dog or wolf bone and two unidentified animal bones. Ten dog canines, two dog mandibles and two animal bones carved to look like dog (or wolf) teeth are comparable to finds from other Wartberg tombs and might have a totemic or talismanic significance. A pierced fossilised seashell was also found.

=== Amber ===
21 amber beads were found, virtually all of them from phase 2. Amber is not locally available and was probably imported from the Baltic.

=== Metal ===
While poor in other finds, the tomb was remarkably rich in metal, especially copper. Six copper spirals were found, one from phase 1, the rest from phase 2. They are among the earliest metal finds in that part of Europe. The presence of several copper ornaments probably places phases 2 and 3 of the Niedertiefenbach tomb, but not necessarily its erection, in late Wartberg, after 3000 BC.

== Genetics ==
Immel et al. 2019 examined the remains of 42 people of the Wartberg culture buried at Niedertiefenbach c. 3300-3200 BC. They were determined to be of about 60% Early European Farmer (EEF) and 40% Western Hunter-Gatherer (WHG) ancestry. The predominance of the single Y-DNA lineage indicated that the people buried at Niedertiefenbach belonged to a patrilineal society.

== See also ==
- Wartberg culture
- Züschen (megalithic tomb)
- Altendorf (megalithic tomb)
- Lohra (megalithic tomb)

== Bibliography ==
- Immel, Alexander; et al. (November 21, 2019). "Neolithic genomes reveal a distinct ancient HLA allele pool and population transformation in Europe". bioRxiv 10.1101/851188.
- Jockenhövel, A. 1990: Beselich-Niertiefenbach: Megalithgrab. In: F.-R. Herrmann & A. Jockenhövel (eds.): Die Vorgeschichte Hessens, Stuttgart: Theiss, 324–325.
- Raetzel-Fabian, D. 2000: Die ersten Bauernkulturen: Jungsteinzeit in Nordhessen; Vor- und Frühgeschichte im Hessischen Landesmuseum in Kassel, Vol 2 (2nd edition), Kassel: Staatliche Museen.
- Schrickel, W. 1966: Westeuropäische Elemente im neolithischen Grabbau Mitteldeutschlands und die Galeriegräber Westdeutschlands und ihre Inventare; Bonn: Habelt.
- Wurm, K., Schoppa, H., Ankel, C. & Czarnetzki, A. 1963: Die westeuropäische Steinkiste von Niedertiefenbach, Oberlahnkreis, Fundberichte aus Hessen 3, 46–78.
