= Altendorf (megalithic tomb) =

Archaeological site in Hesse, Germany

Coordinates: 51°12′34″N 9°12′13″E

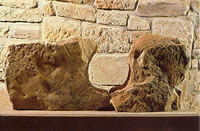
The two-part entrance stone to the burial chamber (Regional Museum Wolfhagen).

The Altendorf tomb (German: Steinkammergrab von Altendorf) was an important megalithic tomb at Altenburg near Naumburg, northern Hesse, Germany. It was a gallery grave belonging to the Late Neolithic Wartberg culture. The Altenburg tomb is of special significance in Central European prehistory because of the large number of individuals it contained.

== Dates ==
The tomb belongs to the Hessian-Westphalian stone cist group ('Hessisch-Westfälische Steinkistengruppe'), which is part of the Wartberg culture. It dates to the 3,400 BC or later and is normally assumed to be one of the earliest such monuments in the region.

== Discovery and excavation ==
The tomb was discovered accidentally, probably through agricultural activity, at some point in the early 20th century. Several small unprofessional attempts at digging appear to have been made until 1926. There are reports of the discovery of several sandstone blocks, and of numerous preserved skeletons, but the significance of the site was not realised at that point. About 4 m of the monument had been destroyed before systematic excavation, directed W. Jordan, took place in 1934. Generally, the contents of the tomb turned out to be remarkably well preserved. The tomb was removed in its entirety after the excavation, but some finds and the entrance stone are on display at Wolfhagen (see below).

== Tomb architecture ==
The tomb, oriented east-south-east to west-north-west was built into a rectangular pit of 17 x 3 m dimensions, with an entrance ramp at the east end. The slabs that formed the tomb walls were placed in shallow foundation trenches along the edges of the pit bottom. The sandstone slabs used were up to 1.8 m long and 0.45 m wide. Their height is unclear as the tops of all surviving slabs had been broken off through agricultural activity, but they were preserved to a height of up to 0.9 m. All slabs leaned inwards slightly, but is not clear whether this was intentional. Although only 9 stones survived, there must originally have been about 33 (15 on each side, 1 at the west end and 2 at the east entrance). They formed a chamber of 17 x 2.9 m size. The entrance was at the E end. Here, The side walls protruded about 1.2 m beyond the limit of the chamber, forming an antae-like feature enclosing a small antechamber. The main chamber was delimited by two slabs set between the side walls, roughly semi-circular openings cut into those slabs formed a mildly ovoid hole of 35 cm diameter, similar to the so-called Seelenlöcher (German for "soul holes") in the tombs at Züschen, Lohra and Bad Vilbel. It is not clear how the chamber was roofed. A single slab found inside may have belonged to a stone roof, but the presence of a dense packing of limestone, basalt and quartzite slabs, as well as much charcoal, above the tomb deposits may represent the remains of a collapsed wooden roof, perhaps covered by an artificial mound or tumulus. It is also unclear how the tomb was entered. The burial deposits contained in it reached nearly to the height of the top of the preserved wall slabs, making entry (especially carrying a body) through the hole in the east unlikely.

== Tomb interior ==
The anteroom contained a bovine shoulder blade, lying on its earthen floor. The tomb chamber proper also had a simple earthen floor, but here and there it had been covered with limestone slabs. Such pavings occurred especially near the back and underneath groups of burials. Occasionally, slabs set on edge delimited small areas, one such partition contained 5 skulls of children. The dead had been placed in the tomb over time, possibly over several centuries. There were up to 4 burial layers, separated by layers of soil, stones, charcoal and rotten wood, perhaps the remains of intermediate coverings or floors. More recent depositions often damaged, moved or truncated earlier ones. There were fully articulated skeletons, fragmentary ones, piles of skulls (near the walls) and caches of other sorted bones, indicating some reorganisation of the remains after decay of their flesh had taken place. It appears that at that point, bones were often sorted according to type. Skulls were frequently stacked as piles or pyramids. 30 skulls were sitting in a row along the left wall. Intriguingly, of 8 articulated skeletons, only 2 retained the skull. As far as determinable, all bodies were placed parallel to the tomb, with their head towards the east. Some of the skeletons were associated with gravegoods. For example, an elderly man was accompanied by 5 fox jawbones, an arrowhead, a fossilised seashell, and several pierced dog teeth. A woman of over 40 years' age was found with a fox jaw, 20 pierced dog teeth and some cremated children's bones. The presence of burnt human remains is unusual in Wartberg culture tombs, with the exception of the tomb at Lohra.

== Anthropological analysis ==
The bones indicated a minimum of 235-250 individuals. In an early attempt at detailed anthropological study, their age and sex profiles were determined. The age profile is as follows: Age 0–7: 23 individuals; age 7–14: 20 individuals; age 18–22: 10 individuals; age 22 to 50: 169 individuals; over fifty: 13 individuals. The sex of 115 skeletons could be determined; 75 of them were male, 40 female. The average height of the males was circa 1.6 m. The skulls are reported to have had "bad teeth". Some of the bones indicated healed injuries. It is not clear whether the bones represent the whole population of a settlement, or a selection. In either case, they must represent several generations.

== Finds ==
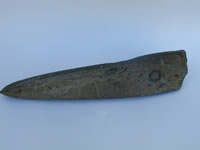
A stone axe from the tomb chamber (Regional Museum Wolfhagen).

=== Pottery ===
Pottery was numerous, but mostly fragmented. It is not clear whether it was broken before deposition, or perhaps as a result of being moved during the tombs' multiple reorganisations. No relationships between pottery vessels and individual skeletons were noted. The pottery included at least 2 collared bottles (a typical Wartberg culture find), a large globular vessel with lugs, some cups with decoration of applied cords, some shallow bowls, and a handled cup.

=== Stone tools ===
There was a copious amount of stone tools, including a trapezoidal axe of Hessian slate, 17 triangular arrowheads of flint and slate, 16 flint and 7 slate blades, 2 flint scrapers, 1 chalcedony core, plus another 40 pieces of worked stone (mainly flint). At least some of the flint appears to be imported.

=== Worked bone ===
Bone tools included an antler hook and a knife made from a boar's tusk, 5 bone chisels (up to 18 cm long), 5 awls and a tool made of a hollow bird bone.

=== Mammal teeth and mandibles ===
Other bone or antler material probably served a decorative (jewellery) or totemic purpose. Among these are an antler bead and 119 pierced animal teeth, one from a calf, all the others of dog. These were often found together in groups, suggesting necklaces. Mammal mandibles (jawbones) were remarkably common, numbering 66. Most of them (47) were of fox, 5 were dog, 7 wild cat, 2 domestic cat, 2 polecat, 1 hedgehog and 1 piglet. The domestic cat specimens may be misidentified, since the arrival of that species in Central Europe is normally assumed to have occurred about 3,000 years later. Only one jaw was clearly worked, but some appear polished. Most jaws still contain canines, thus they are not the main source of the pierced canines found in such numbers. The presence of so many mandibles is striking, but not clearly understood. They were also numerous at several other Wartberg culture tombs.

=== Other finds ===
There were also 2 clay spindle whorls, bits of deer antler, 3 amber beads (amber must have been imported to the region, probably from the Baltic, a pierced pebble, 2 pierced fossil shells, and a spiral roll of copper, associated with a child's skull.

=== Unworked animal bones ===
Unworked animal bone came from a large array of species, including deer, cattle, wild boar, dog, fox, cat, hare, polecat, and weasel. None of these were numerous, and at least some may be the result of accidental or natural deposition during or after the use of the tomb. Two whole dog skeletons may have been deposited deliberately as burials.

== Exhibitions ==
The entrance stones, the animal mandibles and copies of a variety of other finds are on display in the Wolfhagen Country Museum (Regionalmuseum Wolfhager Land) in Wolfhagen. The remaining finds are in the State Museum of Kassel.

== See also ==
- Züschen (megalithic tomb)
- Lohra (megalithic tomb)
- Niedertiefenbach (megalithic tomb)
- Wartberg culture

== Bibliography ==
- Jockenhövel, A. 1990: Naumburg-Altendorf: Megalithgrab. In: F.-R. Herrmann & A. Jockenhöven (eds.): Die Vorgeschichte Hessens, Stuttgart: Theiss, 450–451.
- Jordan, W. 1954: Das Steinkammergrab von Altendorf, Kr. Wolfhagen, Kurhessische Bodenaltertümer 3, (Marburg: Elwert), p. 5-26.
- Raetzel-Fabian, D. 2000: Die ersten Bauernkulturen: Jungsteinzeit in Nordhessen; Vor – und Frühgeschichte im Hessischen Landesmuseum in Kassel, Vol 2 (2nd edition), Kassel: Staatliche Museen, p. 117–120.
