= Wartberg culture =

Prehistoric culture (3,600-2,800 BC)

- Geographical range: Germany: Northern and Central Hesse, Westphalia, South Lower Saxony, West Thuringia.
- Period: Later Neolithic
- Dates: 3,600–2,800 BC
- Characteristics: collared bottles, strap-handled cups, hilltop settlements, gallery graves, enclosures
- Preceded by: Michelsberg culture
- Followed by: Corded Ware culture, Single Grave culture

The Wartberg culture (German: Wartbergkultur), sometimes: Wartberg group (Wartberggruppe) or Collared bottle culture (Kragenflaschenkultur) is a prehistoric culture from 3,600 -2,800 BC of the later Central European Neolithic. It is named after its type site, the Wartberg, a hill (306m asl) near Niedenstein-Kirchberg in northern Hesse, Germany.

== Distribution ==
The Wartberg culture is currently known to have a distribution in northern Hesse, southern Lower Saxony and western Thuringia; a southern extent as far as the Rhein-Main Region is possible, but not definitely proven at this point.

== Dates ==
The term Wartberg culture describes a group of sites with similar characteristic finds from circa 3600-2800 BC. The Wartberg culture appears to be a regional development derived from Michelsberg and Baalberge culture antecedents. It is contemporary, and in contact, with Bernburg culture and Funnel Beaker (TRB). The Corded Ware and Single Grave cultures succeed it.

== Sites ==
=== Settlements ===
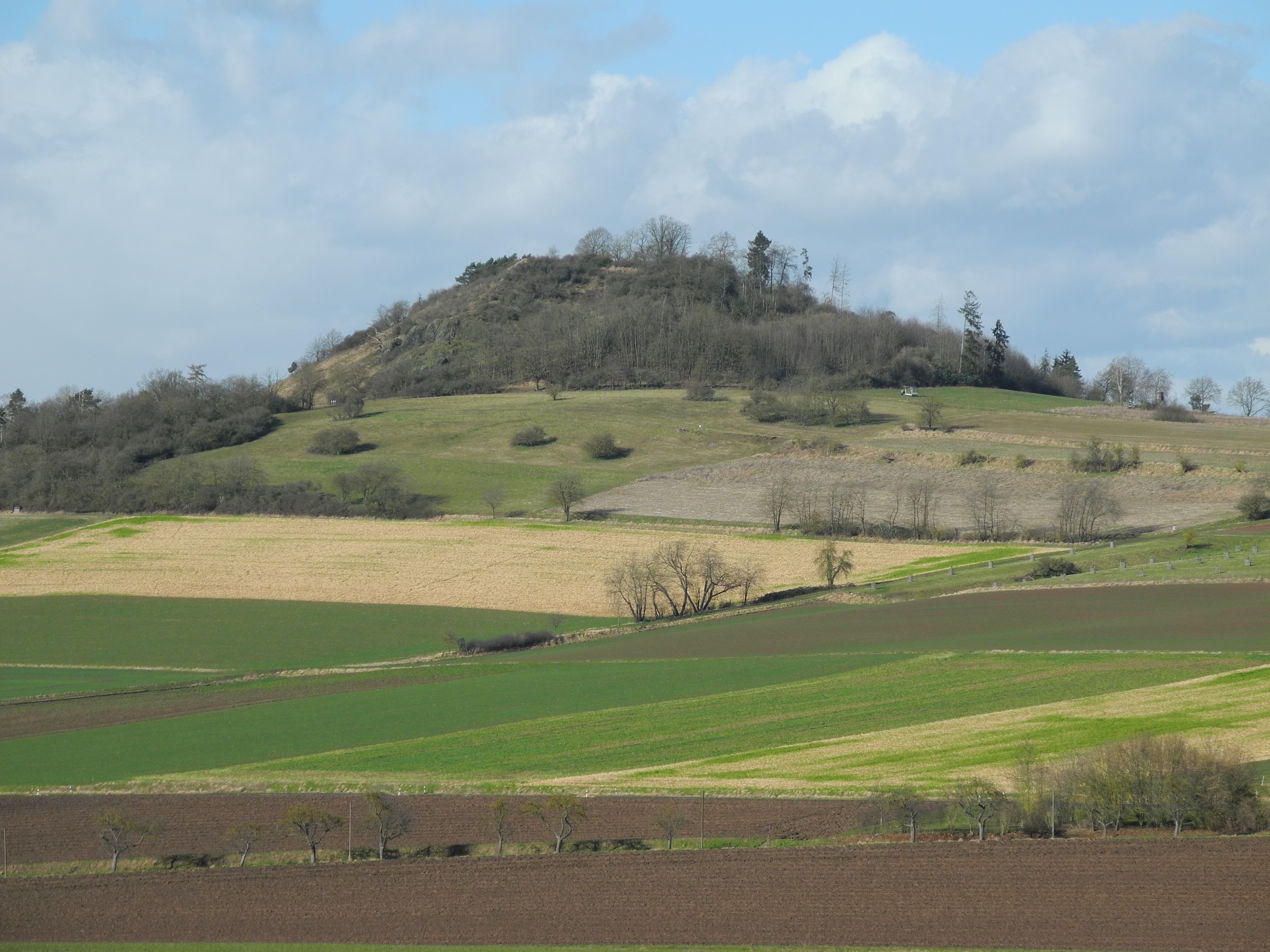
The Wartberg near Kirchberg

Its best known sites are Wartberg, near Kirchberg, Hasenberg, a hill near Lohne, as well as Güntersberg and Bürgel, hills near Gudensberg (all of the above are located on basalt outcrops in the fertile Fritzlar basin), and from the Calden earthwork enclosure. Nearly all settlements identified so far are in hilltop locations: an enclosed site at Wittelsberg near Amöneburg is an exception. Virtually all the known settlements appear to have come into existence several hundred years after the development of Wartberg pottery (see below); early Wartberg settlement activity remains mostly unknown as yet.

Finds from the Wartberg and its sister sites included fragmented bones, mainly of cattle, pig, sheep/goat and deer, but also of other wild animals, like bear or beaver; human bone fragments also occur in some of the settlements. Originally, the Wartberg (first excavated in the later 19th century) was interpreted as a cult place, but the remains of coarse handmade pottery and of mud wall cladding do suggest settlement activity.

=== Megalithic tombs ===
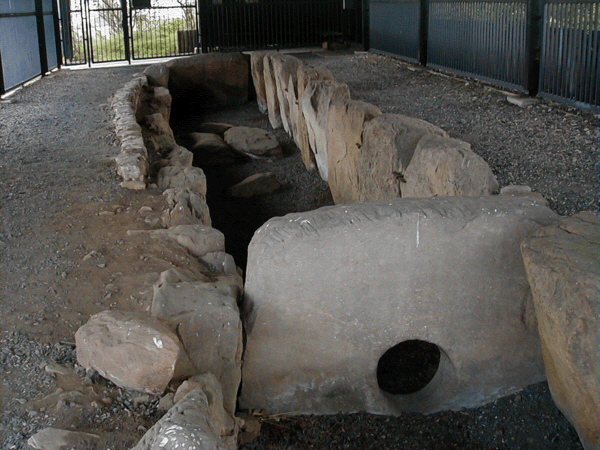
The megalithic tomb at Züschen

Wartberg material is also found in a number of gallery graves (a type of megalithic tomb). Their connection with the Wartberg settlements was only recognised in the 1960s and 1970s, thus the tombs are sometimes treated separately as the Hessian-Westphalian stone cist group (Hessisch-Westfälische Steinkistengruppe).

These include the tombs at Züschen near Fritzlar, at Lohra, at Naumburg-Altendorf, at Hadamar-Niederzeuzheim (now rebuilt in a park at Hachenburg), at Beselich-Niedertiefenbach, at Warburg, Rimbeck and at Grossenrode, as well as two tombs near the Calden enclosure. A tomb at Muschenheim near Münzenberg may also belong to the same type, as may a further one at Bad Vilbel near Frankfurt am Main which was destroyed after 1945.

The best known of these tombs are those of Züschen, Lohra, Niederzeuzzheim and Altendorf. They normally contained the inhumed remains of multiple individuals (the Altendorf tomb contained at least 250 people) of all ages and both sexes. Lohra is an exception insofar as there the dead were cremated. Gravegoods are scarce but include pottery (collared bottles), stone tools and animal bones, especially the jawbones of foxes, which may have played a totemic role. The Züschen tomb is also remarkable for the presence of rock art. Some of the tombs can be directly associated with nearby hilltop sites or settlements, that is, the Züschen tomb with the Hasenberg and the Calden tombs with the earthwork. According to the German archaeologist Waltraud Schrickel, the association with gallery graves suggests a west European influence, perhaps from the Paris Basin in France, where very similar tombs occur. The Wartberg tombs appear to start developing around 3400 BC, earlier than most of the known settlements.

=== Standing stones ===
A loose distribution of standing stones occurs in northern Hesse and west Thuringia. Although their dates are unknown, their geographic spread appears to coincide with that of Wartberg material, perhaps suggesting a connection.

=== Enclosures ===
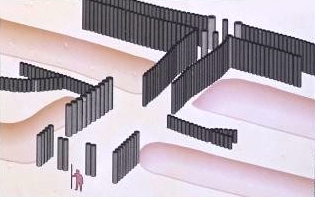
Reconstruction of part of the Calden enclosure

The Calden earthwork, a large enclosure northwest of modern Kassel, was built around 3700 BC. It is an irregular enclosure of two ditches and a palisade, encompassing an area of 14 hectares. The enclosure has five openings, perhaps comparable to British Causewayed enclosures. Although it can with some certainty be seen as derived from the Michelsberg tradition, material associated with its early phases suggests a close connection with early Wartberg. It appears to have been a tradition for several centuries to bury animal bones (food refuse?) and broken pots in pits dug into the partially filled-in earthwork ditches. The ditches also contain the remains of many human inhumations. This activity continued until circa 2000 BC and was particularly intensive during the Wartberg period. Two nearby graves postdate the earthwork by several centuries, but coincide with that activity. While the original function of the earthwork is not necessarily explained by these finds, it appears likely that at least during later phases of its use it had a ritual significance, perhaps connected with a cult of the dead. In contrast, the enclosure around the settlement at Wittelsberg appears to be simply protective/defensive in nature.

== Finds ==
=== Pottery ===
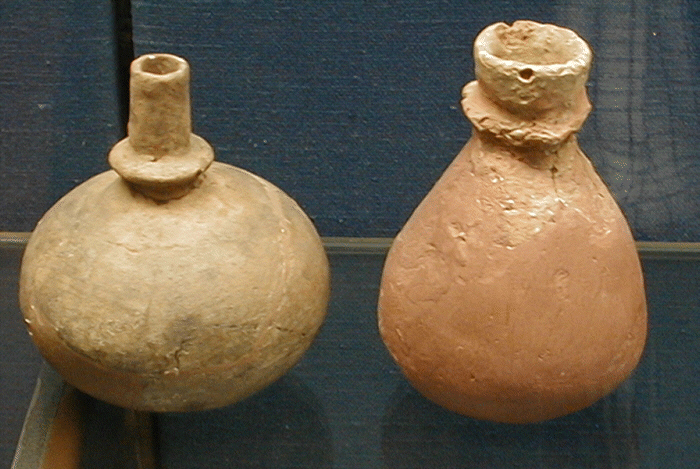
Collared bottles from the Züschen tomb

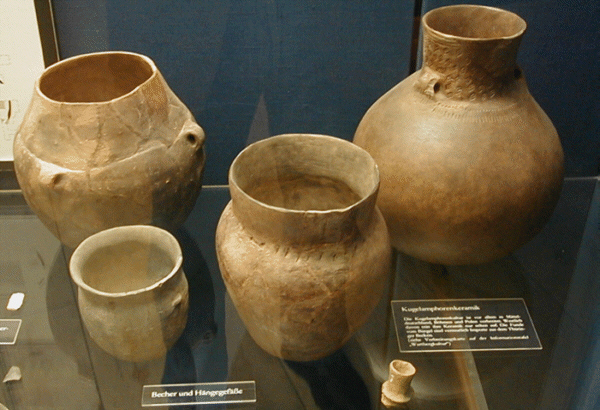
Typical Wartberg pots in Kassel museum

Wartberg pottery is handmade and mostly very coarse. Typical shapes in the mid-4th millennium include saucepans with inturned rim and deep incisions, cups with strap handles, collared bottles (Kragenflaschen). The presence of pottery with deeply incised patterns as well as of clay drums suggest connections with the Funnel Beaker culture (TRB) of Central Germany.

In the later Wartberg, strap-handled cups, funnel beakers, varied bowls, large pots with holes below the rim and collared bottles occur. The frequent presence of collared bottles, not least in the tombs, is of special interest. The bottles are made with somewhat more care than other vessels; their very specific shape suggests a special function, often suggested to be connected with the storage of special material, like vegetable oil or sulphur, perhaps for healing purposes.

=== Stone and bone tools ===
Slate axes are very common, slate blades also occur. The Wartberg culture produced fine stone arrowheads with well defined tangs and "wings". A variety of bone tools, mainly points, has been found both in tombs and settlements.

== Economy ==
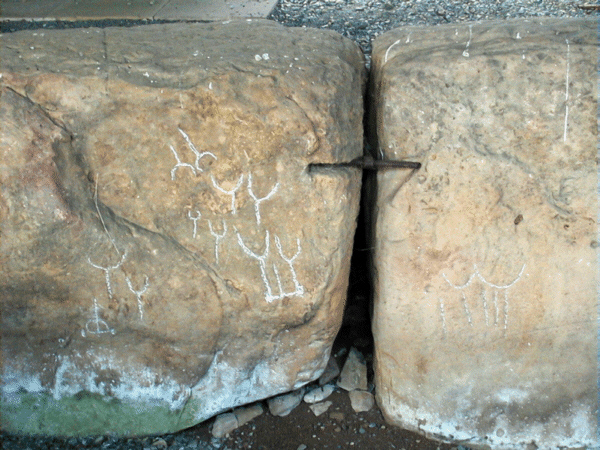
Engravings of cattle and carts on the Züschen tomb

Little can be said about the economy of the Wartberg group. The location of sites and certain finds suggest a broadly sedentary society subsisting from agriculture and animal husbandry, but hunting may play a considerable economic role. The Wartberg area appears to be in general trade contact with its neighbouring regions.

== Social aspects ==
The presence of earthworks and of collective tombs indicates different levels of collective effort, thus implying a considerable degree of social organisation.

== Genetics ==
Lipson et al. 2017 examined the remains of 4 individuals buried c. 4000-3000 BC at the Blätterhöhle site in modern-day Germany, during which the area was part of the Wartberg culture. The 3 samples of Y-DNA extracted belonged to the paternal haplogroups R1b1, R1 and I2a1, while the 4 samples of mtDNA extracted belonged to the maternal haplogroups U5b2a2, J1c1b1, H5, U5b2b2. The individuals carried a very high amount of Western Hunter-Gatherer (WHG) ancestry, estimated at 40–50%, with one individual displaying as much as c. 75% Lipson et al. 2017 also examined a male of the Wartberg culture buried at Erwitte-Schmerlecke in modern-day Germany c. 3500-2900 BC. He was found to be a carrier of the paternal haplogroup I and the maternal haplogroup J2b1a.

Immel et al. 2019 examined the remains of 42 people of the Wartberg culture buried at Niedertiefenbach, Germany c. 3300-3200 BC. They showed about 60% Early European Farmer (EEF) and 40% WHG ancestry, being thus with by much more hunter-gatherer ancestry substantially different from peoples of the earlier Linear Pottery Culture (LBK). This suggests that the demise of the LBK culture was accompanied by a major demographic shift.

da Silva et al. 2025 generated genome-wide data from individuals associated with the Wartberg culture, some of which were subsequently incorporated into a larger analysis by da Silva et al. 2026 of 203 individuals from five Wartberg gallery graves and the nearby Western Funnelbeaker (TRB-West) site of Sorsum. The study found that the Sorsum individuals clustered genetically with the Wartberg population rather than with other Funnelbeaker groups, indicating that the two archaeological groups formed a genetically continuous population despite differences in material culture. It also identified first- and second-degree biological relatives buried up to 225 km apart, providing evidence of sustained long-distance mobility between Late Neolithic communities. In addition, the study found that Wartberg gallery graves served as communal burial sites used by multiple biological families as well as unrelated individuals, suggesting that social kinship played an important role in burial practices.

== Museums ==
Wartberg material is on display at the following museums:

- Hessian State Museum (Hessisches Landesmuseum), Kassel
- Heimatmuseum Fritzlar

== See also ==
- Züschen (megalithic tomb)
- Lohra (megalithic tomb)
- Altendorf (megalithic tomb)
- Niedertiefenbach (megalithic tomb)

== Bibliography ==
- Joseph Bergmann: Vor- und Frühgeschichtliche Sammlung im Heimatmuseum Fritzlar. Ed. v. Hessischer Museumsverband Kassel. Thiele und Schwarz, Kassel 1975, S. 24-25.
- Albrecht Jockenhövel: Die Jungsteinzeit. in: Fritz-Rudolf Hermann & Albrecht Jockenhövel (eds.): Die Vorgeschichte Hessens, Theiss, Stuttgart 1990, p. 121-194.
- Lutz Fiedler: Eine befestigte Siedlung der Jungsteinzeit bei Wittelsberg, Kreis Marburg-Biedenkopf. Zur Archäologie des 4. Und 3. Jahrtausends vor Christus; Denkmalpflege in Hessen 2/1991; 23-27.
- Immel, Alexander; et al. (November 21, 2019). "Neolithic genomes reveal a distinct ancient HLA allele pool and population transformation in Europe". bioRxiv 10.1101/851188.
- Lipson, Mark; et al. (November 8, 2017). "Parallel palaeogenomic transects reveal complex genetic history of early European farmers". Nature. 551 (7680). Nature Research: 368–372. Bibcode:2017Natur.551..368L. doi:10.1038/nature24476. PMC 5973800. PMID 29144465.
- da Silva, Nicolas Antonio; et al. (2025). "Admixture as a source for HLA variation in Neolithic European farming communities". Genome Biology. 26 (1): 43. doi:10.1186/s13059-025-03509-6. PMC 11869582. PMID 40022192.
- da Silva, Nicolas Antonio; et al. (2026). "Long-distance genetic relatedness in megalithic central Europe". Science. 392 (6800): 839–844. Bibcode:2026Sci...392..839D. doi:10.1126/science.aeb2926. PMID 42166585.
- Eduard Pinder: Bericht über die heidnischen Alterthümer der ehemals kurhessischen Provinzen Fulda, Oberhessen, Niederhessen; Herrschaft Schmalkalden und Grafschaft Schaumburg, welche sich in den gegenwärtig vereinigten Sammlungen des Museums Fridericianum zu Cassel und des Vereins für hessische Geschichte und Landeskunde befinden. Zeitschrift des Vereins für hessische Geschichte und Landeskunde, suppl. 6; Cassel (Kassel) 1878.
- Dirk Raetzel-Fabian: Die ersten Bauernkulturen. Jungsteinzeit in Nordhessen. Vor- u. Frühgeschichte im Hessischen Landesmuseum in Kassel. Vol 2. Kassel 2000, p. 105-138. ISBN 3-931787-11-7
- Dirk Raetzel-Fabian: Calden. Erdwerk and Bestattungsplätze des Jungneolithikums. Bonn 2000(b). ISBN 3-7749-3022-8
- Dirk Raetzel-Fabian: Absolute Chronology and Cultural Development of the Wartberg Culture in Germany, www.jungsteinsite.de, 2002 Pdf
- Waltraut Schrickel: Westeuropäische Elemente im neolithischen Grabbau Mitteldeutschlands und Die Galeriegräber Westdeutschlands und ihre Inventare. Beiträge zur Ur- und Frügeschichtlichen Archäologie des Mittelmeer-Kulturraumes 4; Bonn 1966.
- Waldtraut Schrickel: Die Funde vom Wartberg in Hessen. Kasseler Beiträge zur Vor- und Frühgeschichte. Vol 1. Elvert, Marburg 1969.
- Waltraud Schrickel, 1976: Die Galeriegrab-Kultur Westdeutschlands; Ensteheung, Gliederung und Beziehung zu benachbarten Kulturen. In: Fundamenta A3, Die Anfänge des Neolithikums vom Orient bis Nordeuropa, Vb; Köln & Wien: Böhlau, 188-239.
- Winrich Schwellnuß: Wartberg-Gruppe und hessische Megalithik; ein Beitrag zum späten Neolithikum des Hessischen Berglandes, Materialien zur Vor- und Frühgeschichte von Hessen, Vol. 4, Wiesbaden 1979.
- Winrich Schwellnuß: Nachuntersuchungen auf dem Guntersberg bei Gudensberg Kr. Fritzlar-Homberg. in: Fundberichte aus Hessen. Bd 9/10. Habelt, Bonn 1970, p. 102-104. ISSN 0071-9889
- Winrich Schwellnuß: Untersuchung einer spätneolithischen Höhensiedlung auf dem Hasenberg bei Lohne, Kr. Fritzlar-Homberg. Fundberichte aus Hessen. Vol 11. Habelt, Bonn 1971, p. 118-121. ISSN 0071-9889
