= Lohra (megalithic tomb) =

Big stone grave in Germany

Coordinates: 50°44′31″N 8°37′15″E

The Lohra tomb (German: Steinkammergrab von Lohra) was a megalithic monument outside Lohra near Marburg in north central Hesse, Germany. It is one of the lesser known among its type in Central Europe. It dates to the Late Neolithic, probably just after 3000 BC. It belongs to the gallery graves of the Wartberg culture, but is unique among them because of its rich ceramic assemblage.

== Discovery and excavation ==
The tomb was discovered accidentally in 1931 by the farmer Jakob Elmshäuser who encountered an obstacle when ploughing a field. It turned out to be a large rectangular sandstone block, sitting just below the surface. Professor Gero von Merhart, specialist for prehistoric monuments in the area, was contacted. As a result, the site was excavated by students from the University of Marburg under the direction of Otto Uenze.

== Tomb architecture ==
The sunken rectangular chamber measured c. 5 x 2.2m (internal measurements), narrowing somewhat towards the back. Although most of its orthostaths were missing, it was still possible to reconstruct its rectangular plan from the foundation trenches. The individual slabs reached a length of 60 cm to 1m, were 40 cm wide and about 80 cm high. Their weight varied between 800 and 1,000 kg.

The tomb consisted of a large main chamber and a small open antechamber. They were separated by a large sandstone slab with a circular hole, similar to the one at Züschen. This so-called Seelenloch (German for "soul hole") had a diameter of 30–35 cm. It is suggested that such a small opening should not have served the passage of dead bodies but may represent a symbolic gateway between the worlds of the living and the dead during cultic rituals or offering ceremonies that took place in the anteroom. Only a quarter of the Lohra Seelenloch stone survived. The bottom of the sunken main chamber was covered with a clay floor of 3–5 cm thickness. The tomb probably had a wooden roof. The presence of many stones in and around the chamber probably indicates that it was originally covered by an artificial mound or tumulus.

== Human remains ==
In contrast to the finds from the well-known tombs at Züschen or Altendorf, the dead at Lohra had been cremated. There were about 20 individuals, including adult men and women as well as children.

== Pottery ==
They were accompanied by a large amount of pottery vessels, which is a unique feature among the northern Hessian (Wartberg culture) gallery graves. 20 vessels that had been placed on the chamber floor and later covered in human ashes were almost fully preserved. Handled cups or mugs with plastic decorations, similar to finds from Züschen, were especially common, as were bowls, some of them with feet and handles. The finds also include a large double conical bowl with strap handle and a pattern of alternating standing and hanging semicircles. Other double conical vessels survived only in fragments. One vessel has metope-like ornaments resembling the French Chasséen culture. It has been pointed out that the pottery from Lohra is very similar to that from the Wartberg culture settlement on the Hasenberg near Fritzlar.

== Other finds ==
Apart from ceramics, there was a very carefully made serpentine axe with an oval shaft hole, a retouched slate blade and a small piece of sheet bronze of unknown function. The metal may not belong to the period of the tomb's original use. The characteristic animal remains known from other Wartberg tombs were absent.

== Disappearance of the entrance stone ==
Most of the finds have been in storage at the Hessian State Museum (Hessisches Landesmuseum) at Kassel since 1931. This does not include the entrance stone, which was moved to the farmyard of the field's owner, where it stayed for 36 years. In 1967, it was decided to place that stone as a monument outside Lohra town hall. Unfortunately, it turned out that it had recently been built into the foundations of a building on the farm.

== See also ==
- Züschen (megalithic tomb)
- Altendorf (megalithic tomb)
- Niedertiefenbach (megalithic tomb)
- Wartberg culture

== Bibliography ==
- Karl Huth: Die Gemeinde Lohra und ihre 10 Ortsteile im Wandel der Jahrhunderte. 1989
- Albrecht Jockenhövel: Lohra - Megalithgrab, in: Fritz-Rudolf Herrmann & Albrecht Jockenhövel (eds.): Die Vorgeschichte Hessens. 1990, p. 435-436.
- Dirk Raetzel-Fabian: Die ersten Bauernkulturen: Jungsteinzeit in Nordhessen. Vor- und Frühgeschichte im Hessischen Landesmuseum in Kassel, Heft 2 (2nd edition). 2000
- Waltraud Schrickel: Westeuropäische Elemente im neolithischen Grabbau Mitteldeutschlands und die Galeriegräber Westdeutschlands und ihre Inventare. 1966
- Winrich Schwelnuß: Wartberg-Gruppe und hessische Megalithik; ein Beitrag zum späten Neolithikum des Hessischen Berglandes. Materialien zur Vor- und Frühgeschichte von Hessen 4. 1979
- Otto Uenze: Das Steinkammergrab von Lohra, Kr. Marburg, Kurhessische Bodenaltertümer 3, 1954, p. 27-48.
