= Rössen culture =

Middle Neoloithic Central European culture

- Geographical range: Central Europe: Germany except north, Low Countries, northeast France, north Switzerland and Austria: Northern and Central Hesse, Westphalia, South Lower Saxony, West Thuringia.
- Period: Neolithic
- Dates: 4,600–4,300 BC
- Characteristics: incised pottery: footed bowls, globular cups, flint blades, axes, adzes longhouse settlements, inhumation graves
- Preceded by: Linear Pottery Culture
- Followed by: Michelsberg culture, Funnelbeaker culture, Pfyn culture

The Rössen culture or Roessen culture (German: Rössener Kultur) is a Central European culture of the middle Neolithic (4,600–4,300 BC).

It is named after the necropolis of Rössen (part of Leuna, in the Saalekreis district, Saxony-Anhalt). The Rössen culture has been identified in 11 of the 16 states of Germany (it is only absent from the Northern part of the North German Plain), but also in the southeast Low Countries, northeast France, northern Switzerland and a small part of Austria.

The Rössen culture is important as it marks the transition from a broad and widely distributed tradition going back to Central Europe's earliest Neolithic LBK towards the more diversified Middle and Late Neolithic situation characterised by the appearance of complexes like Michelsberg and Funnel Beaker Culture.

== Pottery ==
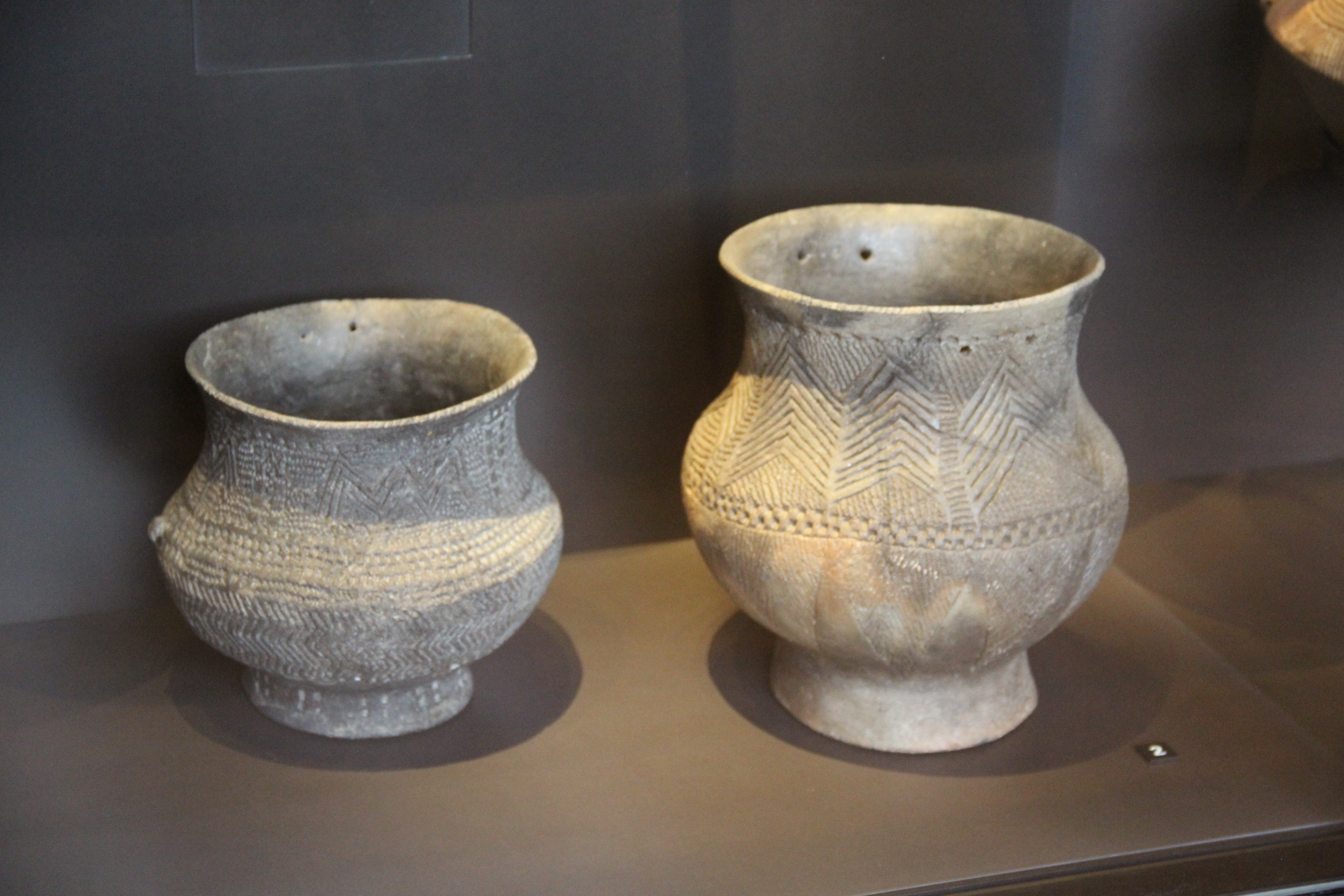
Pottery

Rössen vessels are characteristically decorated with double incisions ("goat's foot incision" or German '"Geißfußstich"') with incrustation of white paste. Grooved or stamped incisions are also common. Over time, the extent of the decorated areas appears to decrease so that on later vessels it is mostly restricted to the neck or entirely absent. Typical shapes include tall footed bowls, globular cups, rectangular sheet-made bowls and boat-shaped vessels.

The surfaces of vessels are usually burnished; their colours range from brown via reddish brown and dark brown to grey-black.

== Stone tools ==
The Rössen repertoire of flint tools is broadly similar to that of the Linear Pottery (LBK) tradition (blades with pyramid-shaped cores), but there is a marked change as regards the raw materials used. Dutch Rijkholt flint, which dominated the LBK tradition, is being replaced with veined 'Plattenhornstein' (Abensberg-Arnhofen type) of Bavarian origin. The most typical solid rock tool is a pierced tall cleaver, but unpierced axes and adzes are also common.

== Domestic architecture and settlement patterns ==
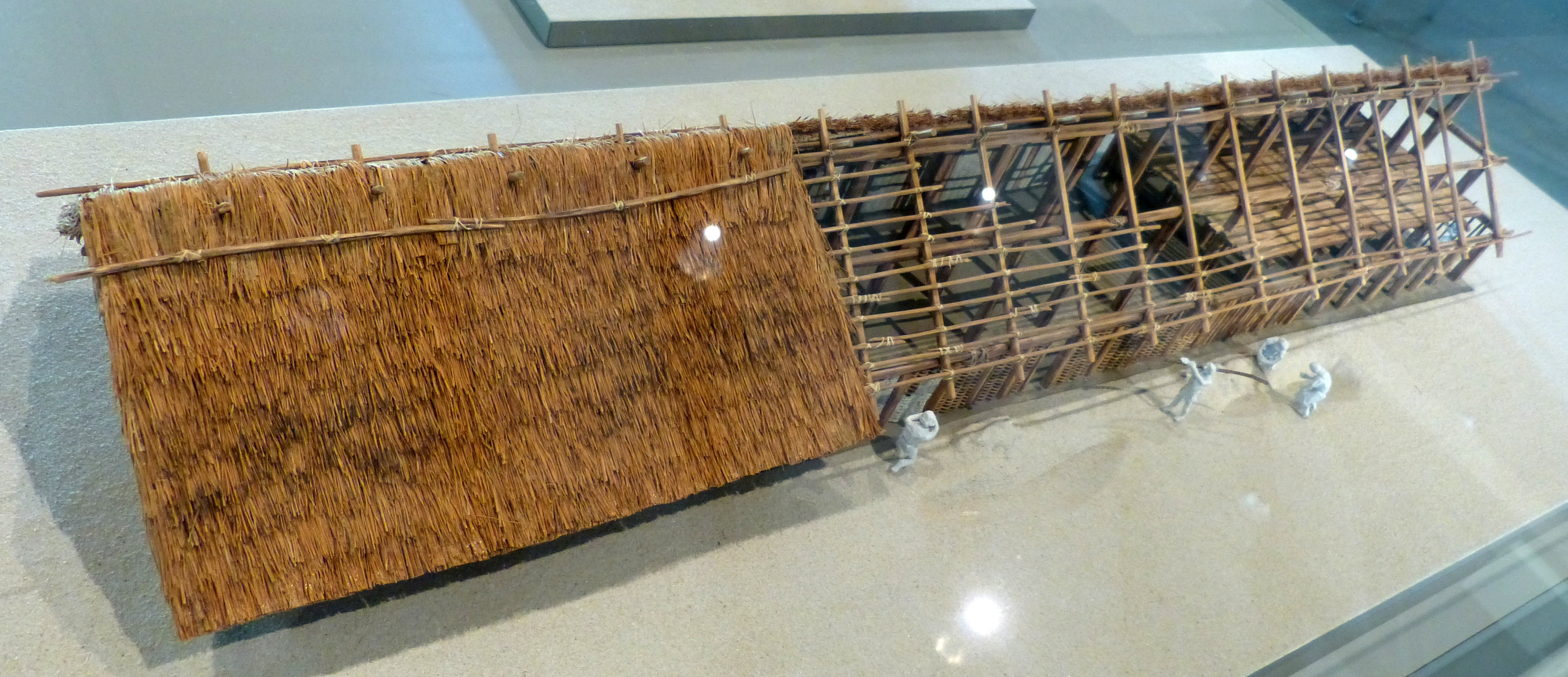
Neolithic longhouse model

Only a few Rössen settlements have been excavated. Prominent examples are the sites of Deiringsen-Ruploh und Schöningen/Esbeck. The predominant structure is a trapezoidal or boat-shaped long house, up to 65 m in length. The ground plans suggest a sloping roofline. Multiple internal partitions are a frequent feature, probably indicating that several smaller (family?) units inhabited a house. Lüning suggests that Rössen settlements were true village communities. Some settlements were surrounded by earthwork enclosures. The majority of settlements were located in areas with Chernozem soils; compared to LBK the area of settlement decreased.

== Burial rites ==
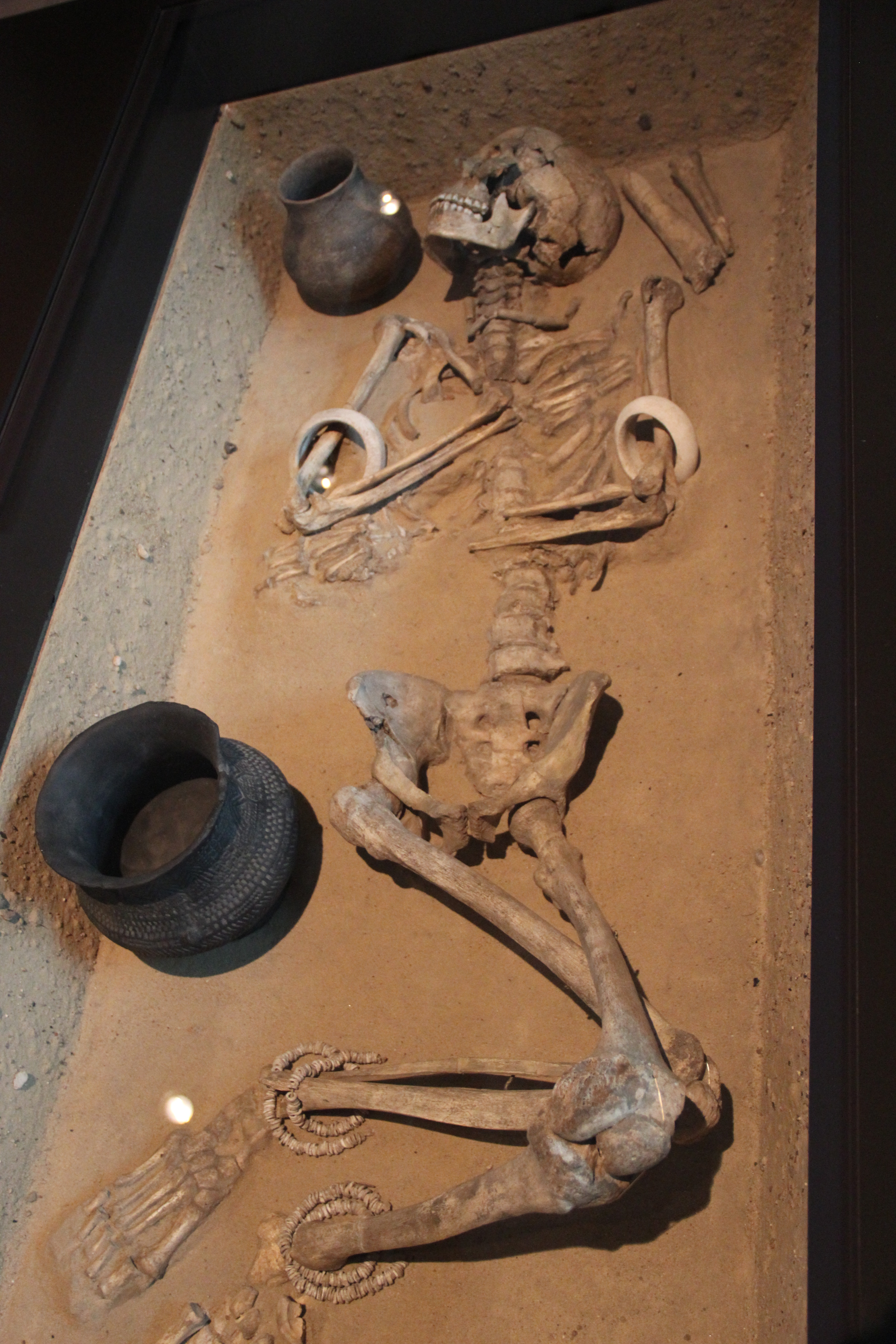
Grave

The dead were mostly buried in a crouched position, lying on their right side and facing East. Graves were dug to a depth of 40 to 160 cm, occasionally they were covered with stone slabs. The exact shapes and sizes of graves are not well understood.

Even less is known about possible cremation burials whose identification as belonging to Rössen is sometimes disputed. Cremated remains and pyre ashes were collected together and accompanied by unburnt grave goods.

Ceramic grave offerings include pedestalled cups, globular cups, lugged cups, bowls, flasks, amphoras, jugs and basins. Limestone rings, stone axes, flint blades and animal bones also occur.

== Economy ==
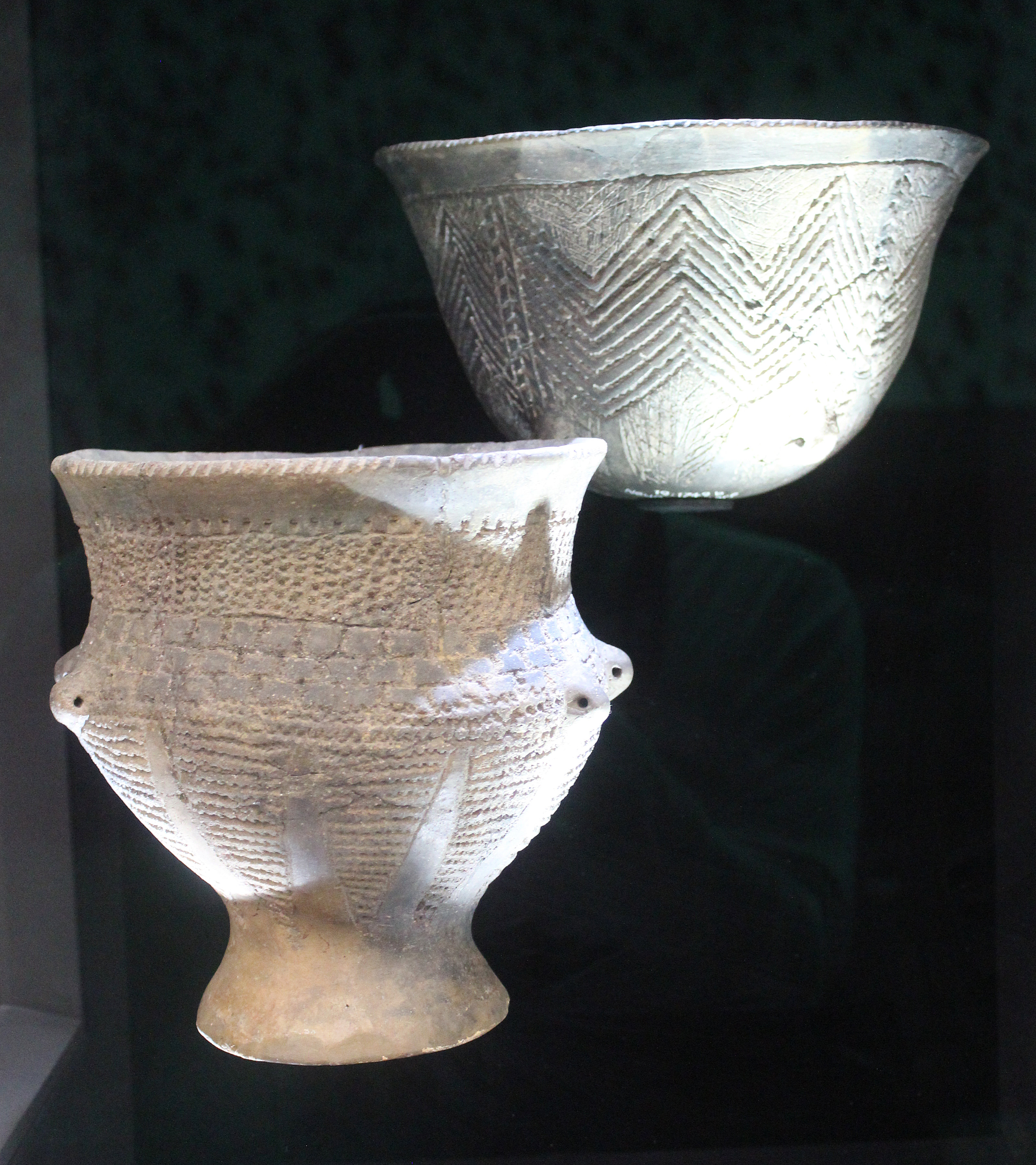
Pottery, Germany

Mixed agriculture was practiced, and cattle, sheep, goats and pigs were kept.

== Origin of British/Irish Neolithic? ==
It is suggested the late Rössen culture may be ancestral to the Neolithic cultures of Britain and Ireland (a group of cultures previously known as Windmill Hill culture), but there is no great similarity in the form of houses or pottery. According to alternative theories, the British Neolithic culture(s) came from Brittany.

== Kurgan hypothesis ==
In the context of the Kurgan hypothesis, certain intrusive elements are pointed to as some of the earliest evidence for penetration by Kurgan culture-based Indo-European elements, but Mallory indicates this idea has failed to gain any real acceptance. Older, now largely discarded theories attempted to make this a very early Indo-European culture; the presently prevailing view assigns it to indigenous non-Indo-European-speaking people.

== Chronologically and geographically adjacent cultures ==
Rössen followed LBK. In its western distribution, the Hinkelstein, Großgartach and Planig-Friedberg complexes intervene between LBK and Rössen.

Rössen is partially contemporaneous with the Southeast Bavarian Middle Neolithic ('Südostbayerisches Mittelneolithikum' or SOB, formally also known as Oberlauterbach Group). In the North, Rössen precedes the early Funnel beaker culture of Baalberge; in the South it is followed by the so-called post-Rössen groups (Wauwil, Bischoffingen-Leiselheim/Strasbourg, Bischheim, Goldberg, Aichbühl, Gatersleben) and Lengyel (Czech Republic, Slovakia, Poland, Austria), and the Münchshöfen Culture (Bavaria).

== Genetics ==
In a 2017 genetic study published in Nature, the remains of a female ascribed to the Rössen culture was analyzed. She was found to be carrying V1a.

== Gallery ==
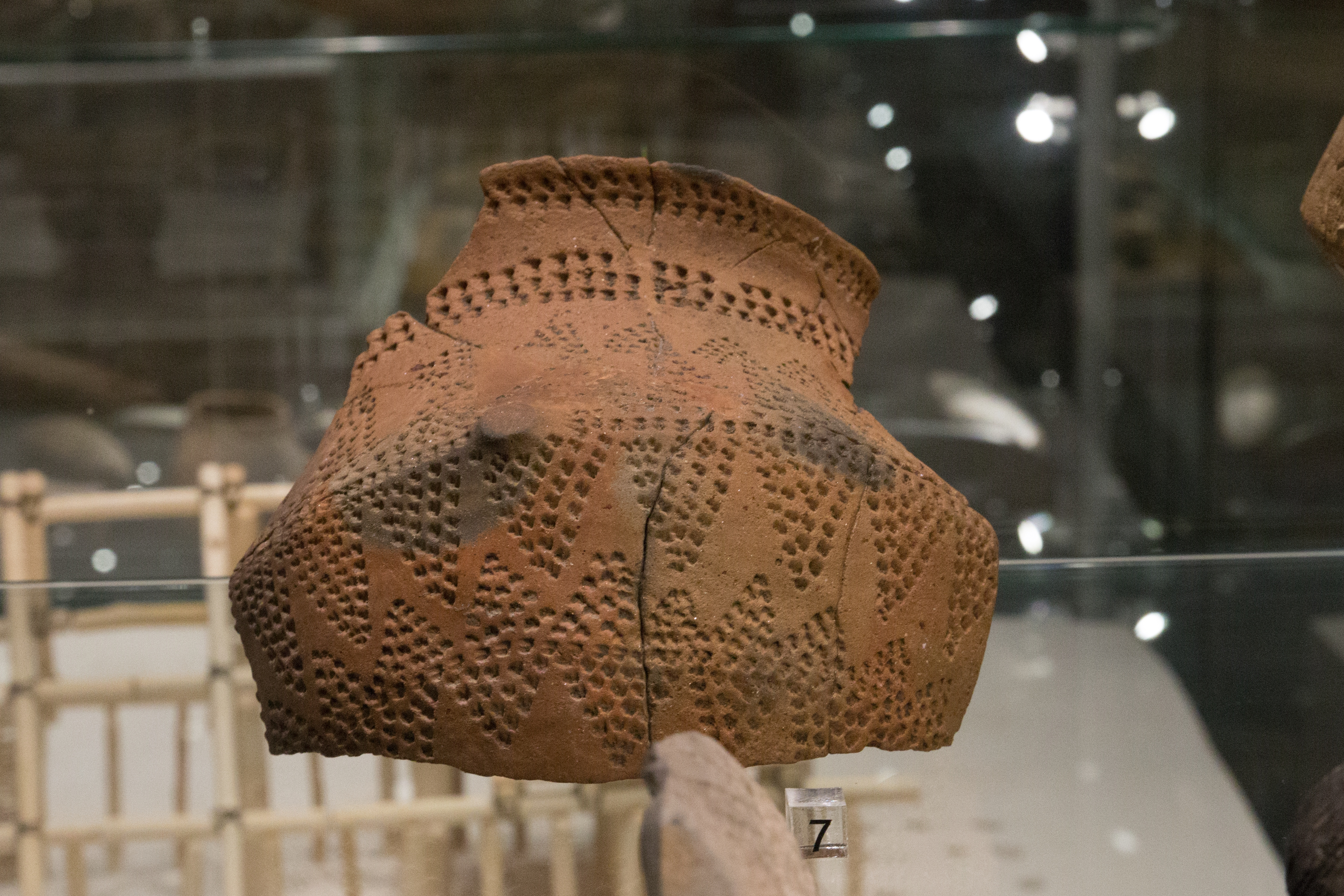
Pottery, Czech Republic

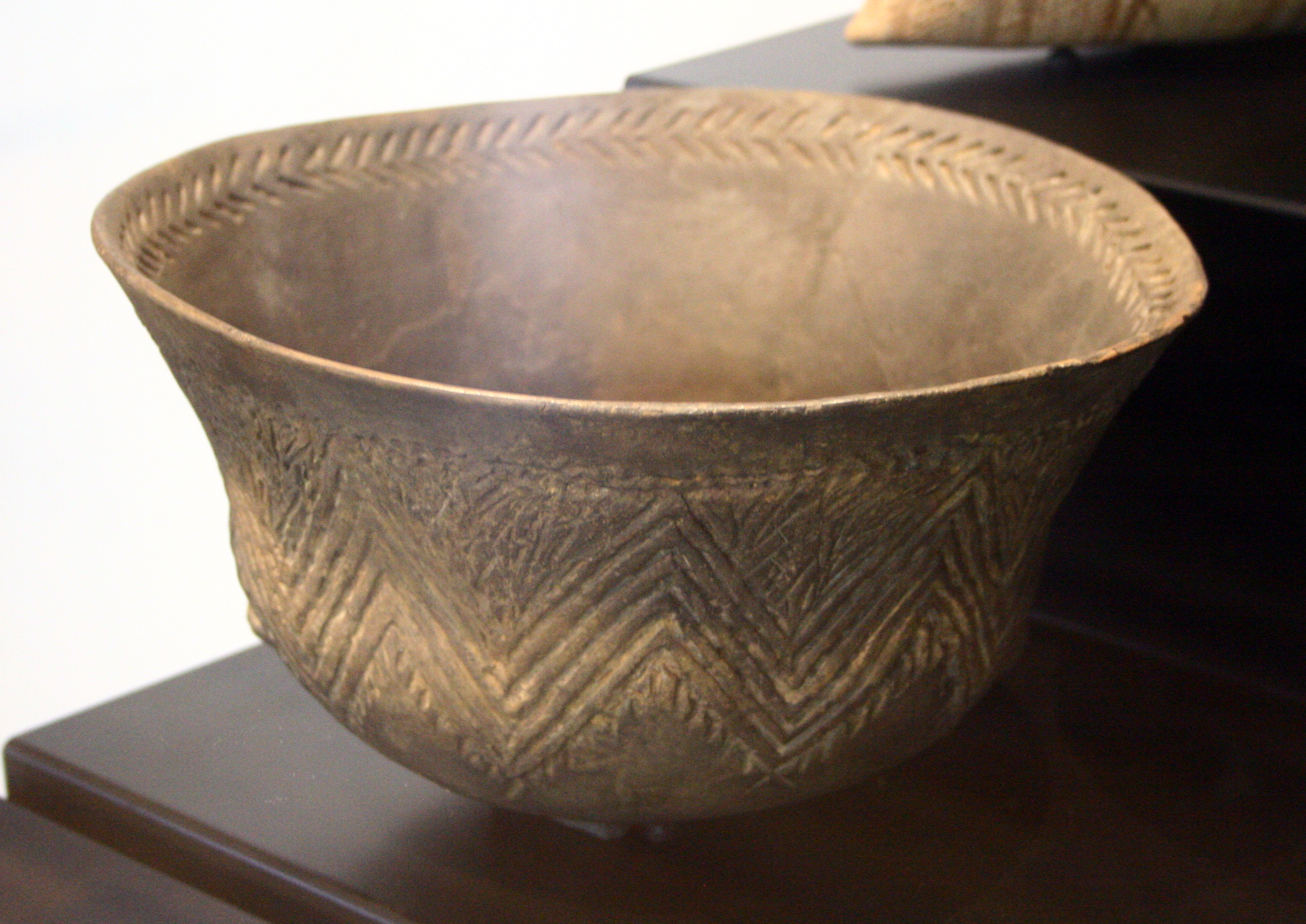
Pottery, Germany

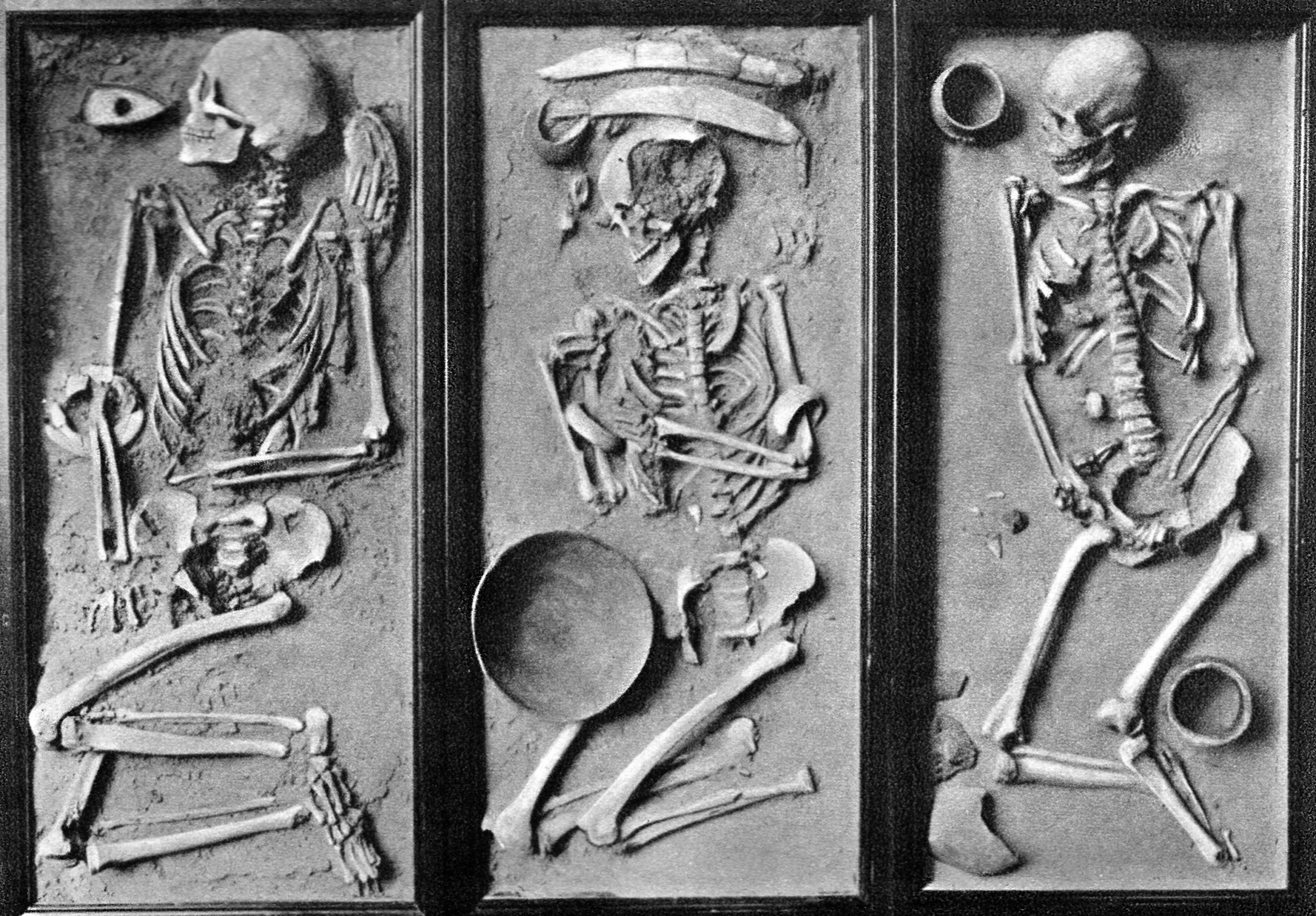
Burials, Germany

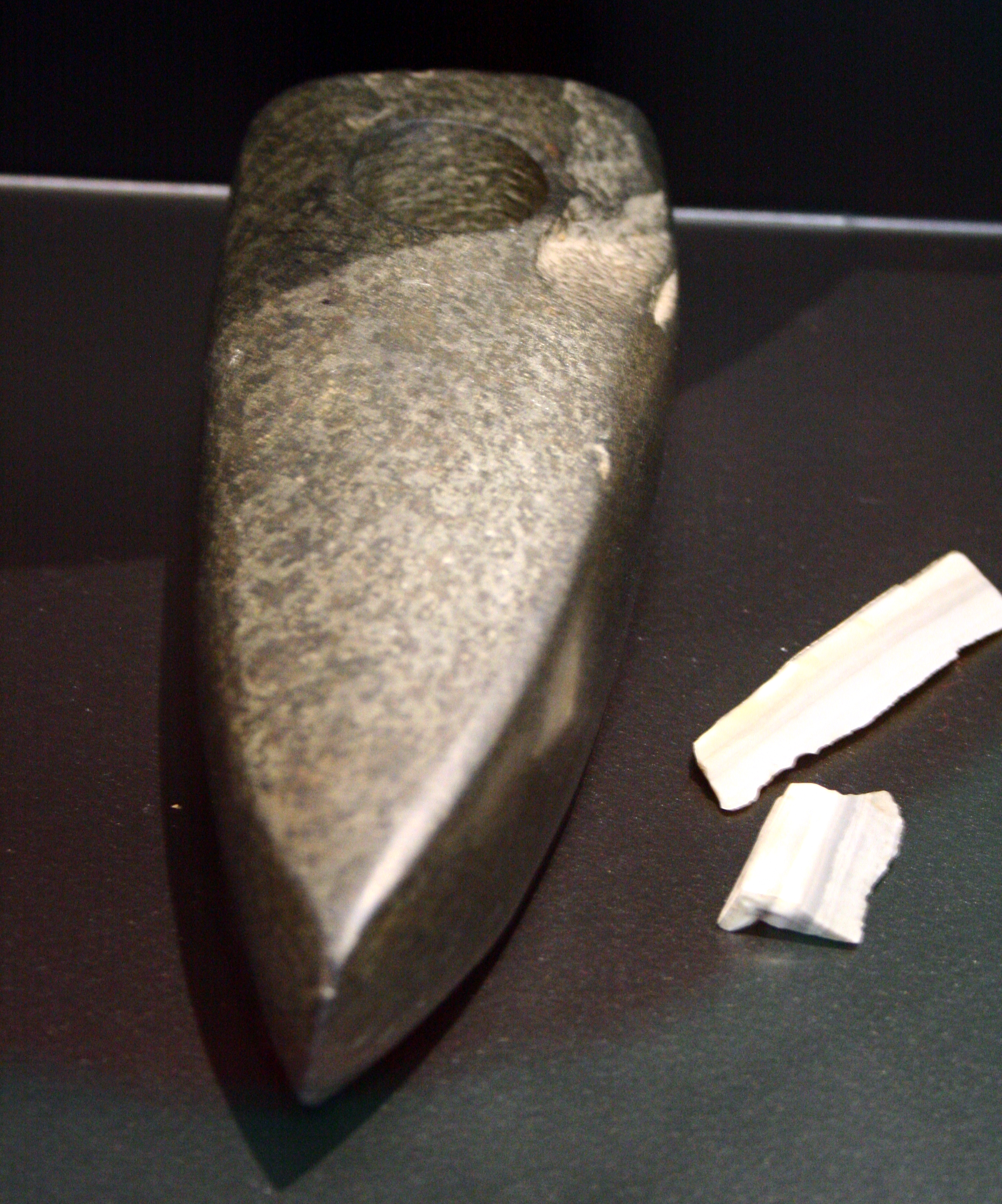
Stone axe, Germany

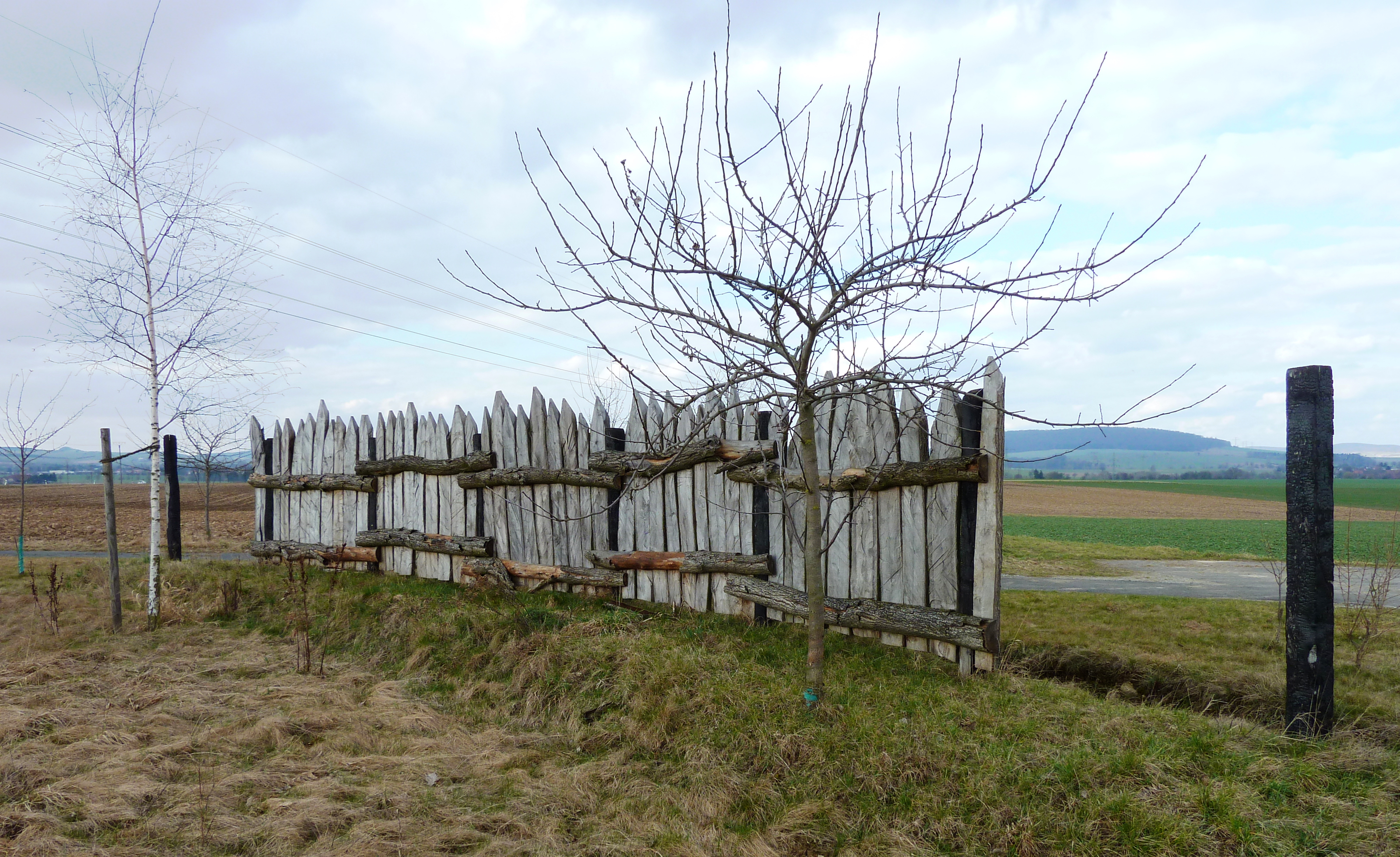
Reconstructed palisade at Grossenrode, Germany, c. 4700 BC

== See also ==
- Lengyel culture

== Literature ==
=== General ===
- J. P. Mallory, "Rössen Culture", Encyclopedia of Indo-European Culture, Fitzroy Dearborn, 1997.
- Joachim Preuß: Das Neolithikum in Mitteleuropa. Kulturen-Wirtschaft-Umwelt vom 6. bis 3. Jahrtausend v.u.Z., Übersichten zum Stand der Forschung. 3 Bde. Beier und Beran, Wilkau-Haßlau, Weißbach 1996, 1998, 1999. ISBN 3-930036-10-X

=== Origins/Development ===
- W. Meier-Arendt: Zur Frage der Genese der Rössener Kultur. In: Germania. 52/1, 1974, 1-15. ISSN 0016-8874
- H.-J. Beier (Hrsg.): Der Rössener Horizont in Mitteleuropa. Wilkau-Haßlau 1994.
- J. Erhardt: Rössener Kultur. In: H.-J. Beier, R. Einicke (Hrsg.): Das Neolithikum im Mittelelbe-Saale-Gebiet. Wilkau-Haßlau 1996, 76-77.

=== Pottery and chronology ===
- H. Behrens: Die Rössener, Gaterslebener und Jordansmühler Gruppe im Mitteldeutschen Raum. Fundamenta A 3, Teil Va (Köln 1972.), 270 ff.
- J. Lichardus: Rössen – Gatersleben – Baalberge. Ein Beitrag zur Chronologie des mitteldeutschen Neolithikums und zur Entstehung der Trichterbecherkulturen. Saarbrücker Beitr. Altkde. 17 (Bonn 1976).
- K. Mauser-Goller: Die Rössener Kultur in ihrem südwestlichen Verbreitungsgebiet. Fundamenta A 3, Teil Va (Köln 1972), 231-268.
- F. Niquet: Die Rössener Kultur in Mitteldeutschland. Jahresschr. Mitteldt. Vorgesch. 26, 1937.
- H. Spatz/S. Alföldy-Thomas: Die "Große Grube" der Rössener Kultur in Heidelberg-Neuenheim. Materialhefte Vor- und Frühgesch. Baden-Württemberg 11 (Stuttgart 1988).
- Otto Thielemann: "Eine Rössener Prachtvase von Burgdorf, Kreis Goslar", Die Kunde, Jg.9,10/1941

=== Subsistence ===
- J. Lüning: Steinzeitliche Bauern in Deutschland - die Landwirtschaft im Neolithikum. Universitätsforschungen zur prähistorischen Archäologie 58 (Bonn 2000).
- U. Piening: Pflanzenreste Die Pflanzenreste aus Gruben der Linearbandkeramik und der Rössener Kultur von Ditzingen, Kr. Ludwigsburg. In: Fundber. Baden-Württemberg 22/1, 1998, 125-160.

=== Architecture ===
- M. Dohrn: Neolithische Siedlungen der Rössener Kultur in der Niederrheinischen Bucht. München 1983.
- A. Jürgens: Die Rössener Siedlung von Aldenhoven, Kr. Düren. In: Rhein. Ausgrab. 19, 1979, 385-505.
- R. Kuper: Der Rössener Siedlungsplatz Inden I. Dissertations-Druck, Köln 1979.
- J. Lüning: Siedlung und Siedlungslandschaft in bandkeramischer und Rössener Zeit. In: Offa. 39, 1982, 9-33.
- H. Luley: Die Rekonstruktion eines Hauses der Rössener Kultur im archäologischen Freilichtmuseum Oerlinghausen. In: Arch. Mitt. Nordwestdeutschl. Beiheft 4. Oldenburg 1990, 31-44.
- H. Luley: Urgeschichtlicher Hausbau in Mitteleuropa. Grundlagenforschung, Umweltbedingungen und bautechnische Rekonstruktion. Universitätsforsch. prähist. Arch. 7. Bonn 1992.
- K. Günther: Die jungsteinzeitliche Siedlung Deiringsen/Ruploh in der Soester Börde. Münster 1976.

=== Burial ===
- R. Dehn: Ein Gräberfeld der Rössener Kultur von Jechtingen, Gde. Sasbach, Kr. Emmendingen. in: Archäologische Nachr. Baden 34, 1985, 3-6.
- J. Lichardus: Rössen-Gatersleben-Baalberge. Saarbrücker Beitr. Altkde 17. Bonn 1976.
- F. Niquet: Das Gräberfeld von Rössen, Kreis Merseburg. Veröff. Landesanstalt Volkheitskde. 9. Halle/S. 1938.

=== Post-Rössen groups ===
- Die Kugelbechergruppen in der südlichen Oberrheinebene. Sonderheft. Cahiers Assoc. Promotion Rech. Arch. Alsace 6, 1990.
- Jens Lüning: Die Entwicklung der Keramik beim Übergang vom Mittel- zum Jungneolithikum im Süddeutschen Raum. Bericht der RGK 50.1969, 3-95.
- M. Zápotocká, Zum Stand der Forschung über die relative Chronologie des frühen Äneolithikums in Böhmen. In: J. Biel/H. Schlichtherle/M. Strobel/A. Zeeb (Hrsg.), Die Michelsberger Kultur und ihre Randgebiete - Probleme der Entstehung, Chronologie und des Siedlungswesens. Kolloquium Hemmenhofen, 21–23 February 1997. Materialh. Ur- u. Frühgesch. Baden-Württemberg 43. Stuttgart 1998, 291-302.
- A. Zeeb: Poströssen – Epirössen – Kugelbechergruppen. Zur Begriffsverwirrung im frühen Jungneolithikum (Die Schulterbandgruppen – Versuch einer Neubenennung). In: H.-J. Beier (Hrsg.), Der Rössener Horizont in Mitteleuropa. Wilkau-Haßlau 1994, 7-10.

== Sources ==
- Lipson, Mark (November 16, 2017). "Parallel palaeogenomic transects reveal complex genetic history of early European farmers". Nature. 551 (7680). Nature Research: 368–372. Bibcode:2017Natur.551..368L. doi:10.1038/nature24476. PMC 5973800. PMID 29144465.
- Narasimhan, Vagheesh M. (September 6, 2019). "The formation of human populations in South and Central Asia". Science. 365 (6457) eaat7487. American Association for the Advancement of Science. bioRxiv 10.1101/292581. doi:10.1126/science.aat7487. PMC 6822619. PMID 31488661.
