= Michelsberg culture =

Central European Neolithic culture

Coordinates: 49°05′16″N 8°33′42″E

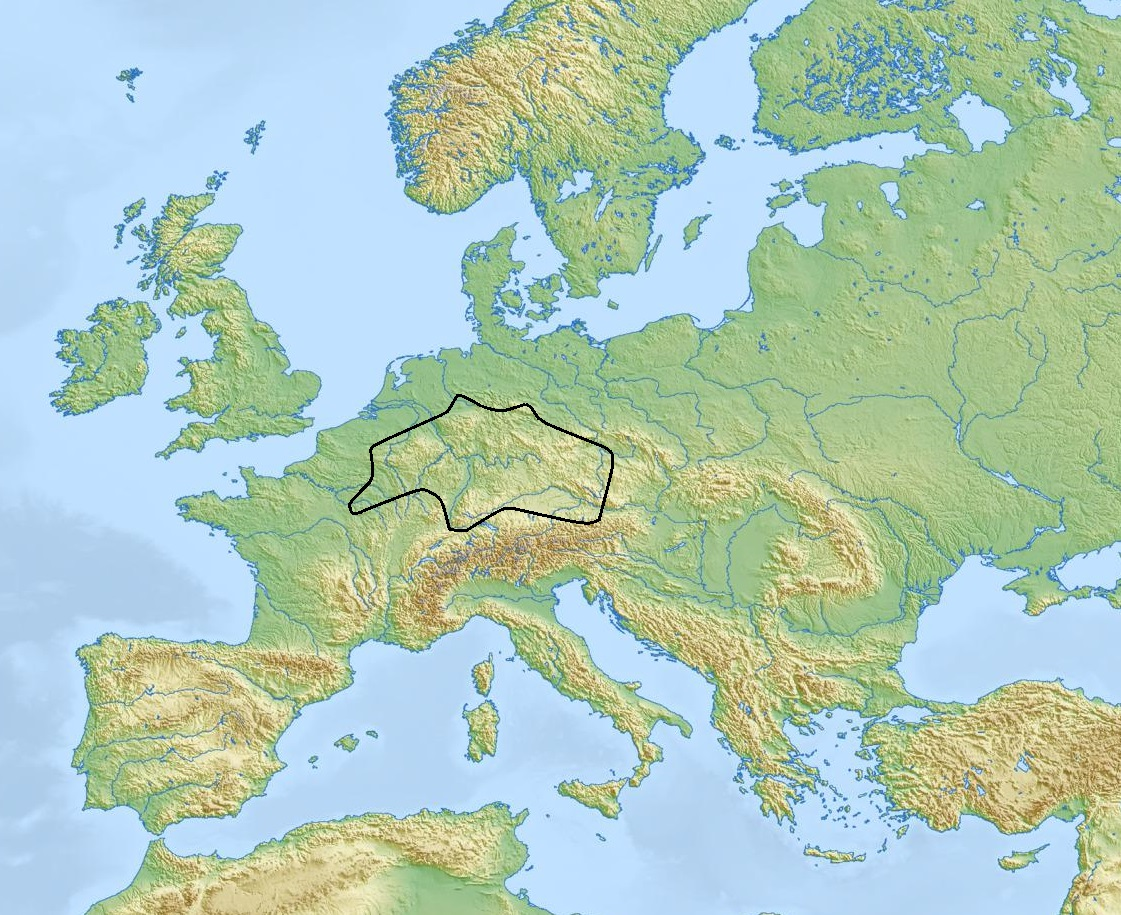
- Geographical range: Belgium, Central Europe, especially West Germany.
- Period: Later Neolithic, Chalcolithic
- Dates: 4400–3500 BC
- Characteristics: tulip beakers, hilltop settlements, enclosures
- Preceded by: Chasséen culture, Rössen culture, Cerny culture
- Followed by: Funnelbeaker culture Wartberg culture, Pfyn culture

The Michelsberg culture (German: Michelsberger Kultur (MK)) is an important Neolithic culture in Central Europe. Its dates are c. 4400–3500 BC. Its conventional name is derived from that of an important excavated site on Michelsberg (short for Michaelsberg) hill near Untergrombach, between Karlsruhe and Heidelberg (Baden-Württemberg), Germany.

The Michelsberg culture belongs to the Central European Late Neolithic. Its distribution covered much of the West Central Europe, along both sides of the Rhine, starting the European tradition of timber framing. A detailed chronology, based on pottery, was produced in the 1960s by the German archaeologist Jens Lüning.

== History ==
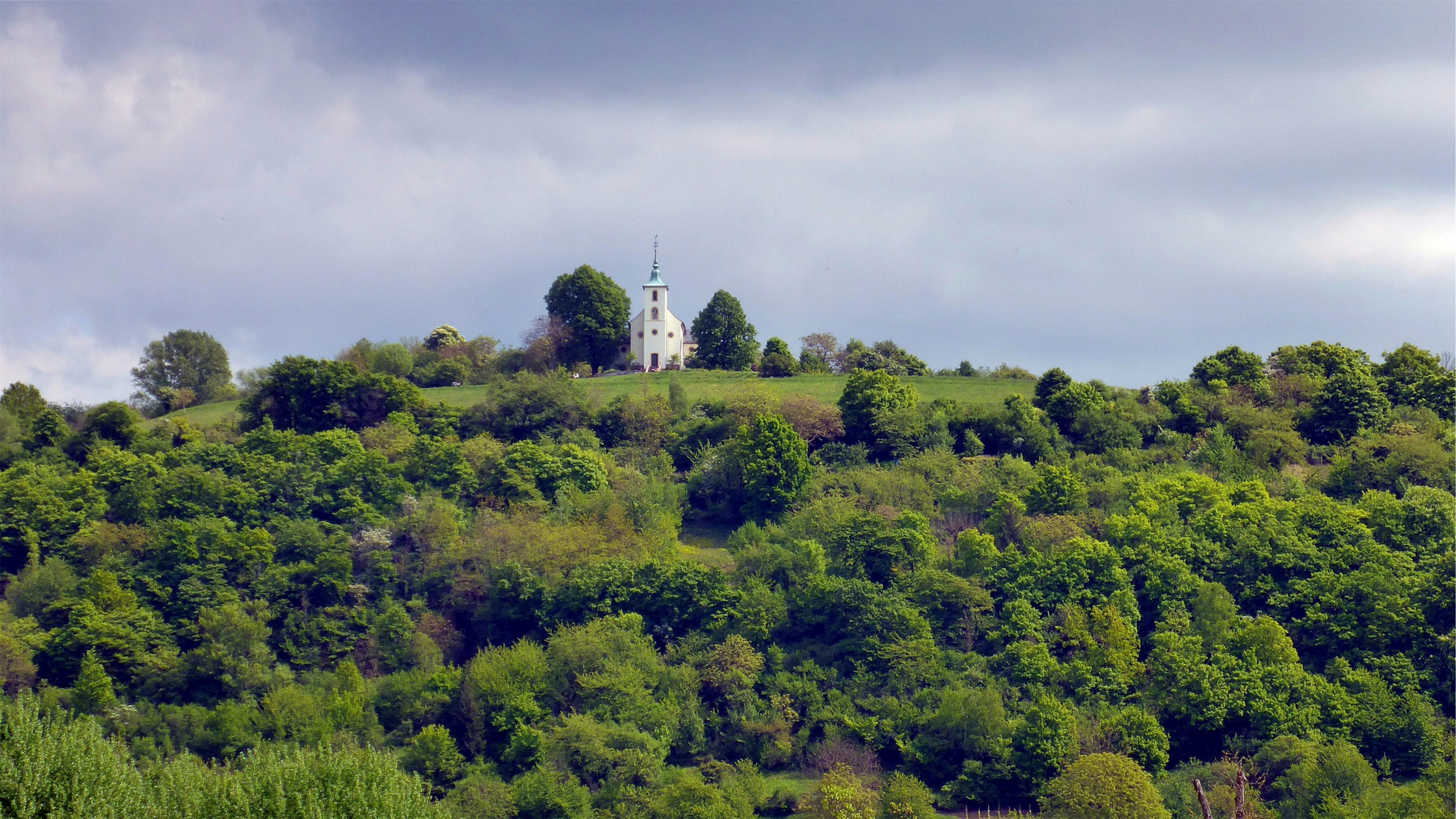
The type site at Michaelsberg (Michelsberg) today

The Michelsberg culture emerges in northeastern France c. 4400 BC. Genetic evidence suggests that it originated through a migration of peoples from the Paris Basin. Its people appear to trace their origins to Mediterranean farmers expanding from the southwest and of the Linear Pottery culture of Central Europe.

Shortly after its emergence in northeastern France, the Michelsberg culture expands rapidly throughout central Germany, northeastern France, eastern Belgium, and the southwestern Netherlands. These areas had previously been occupied by cultures derived from the Linear Pottery culture (LBK), with whom the Michelsberg culture shares surprisingly little cultural or genetic affinity. Archaeological evidence suggests that the Michelsberg expansion was accompanied by violence. The Michelsberg culture has strong affinities to the Chasséen culture of central France. Archaeological evidence strongly suggests that colonists from the Michelsberg culture played an instrumental role in establishing the Funnelbeaker culture of Northern Europe, which brought agriculture to southern Scandinavia. The Michelsberg culture also displays close affinities to the cultures of the Neolithic British Isles. The spread of agriculture into the British Isles by colonists from the continent happens at almost exactly the same time as in Scandinavia, suggesting that the two events are connected.

The Michelsberg culture ended about c. 3500 BC. It is succeeded in its core aspects by the Wartberg culture, with which it displays strong signs of continuity.

== Settlements ==
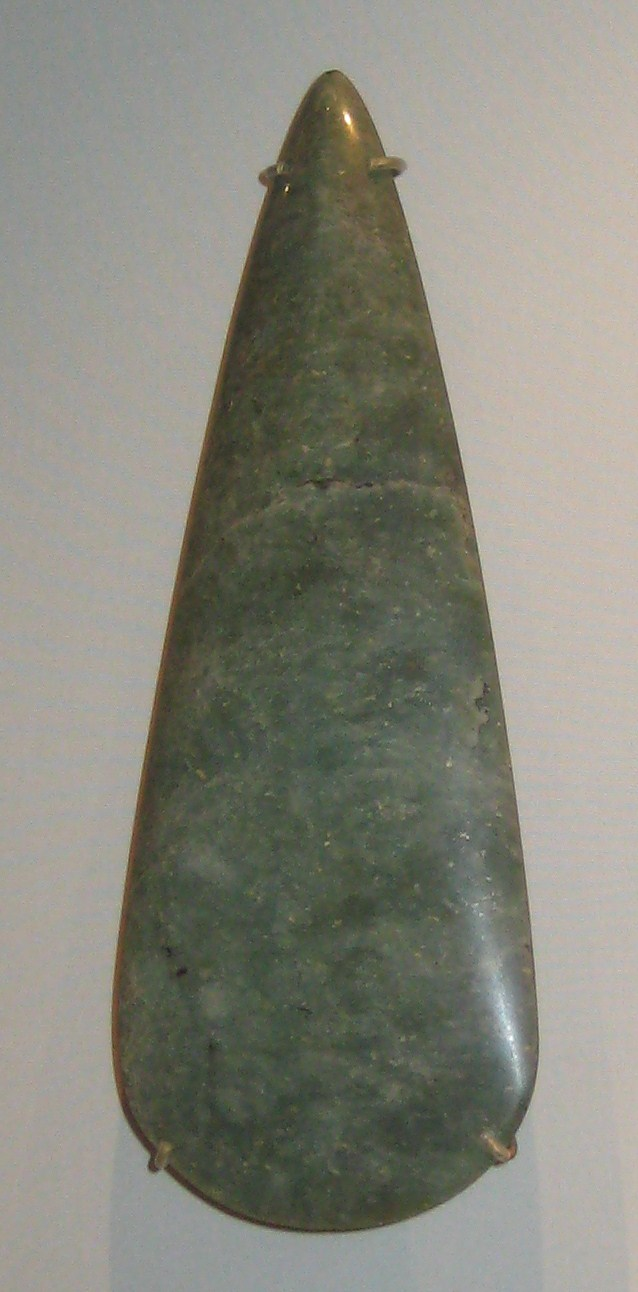
Neolithic jade axe

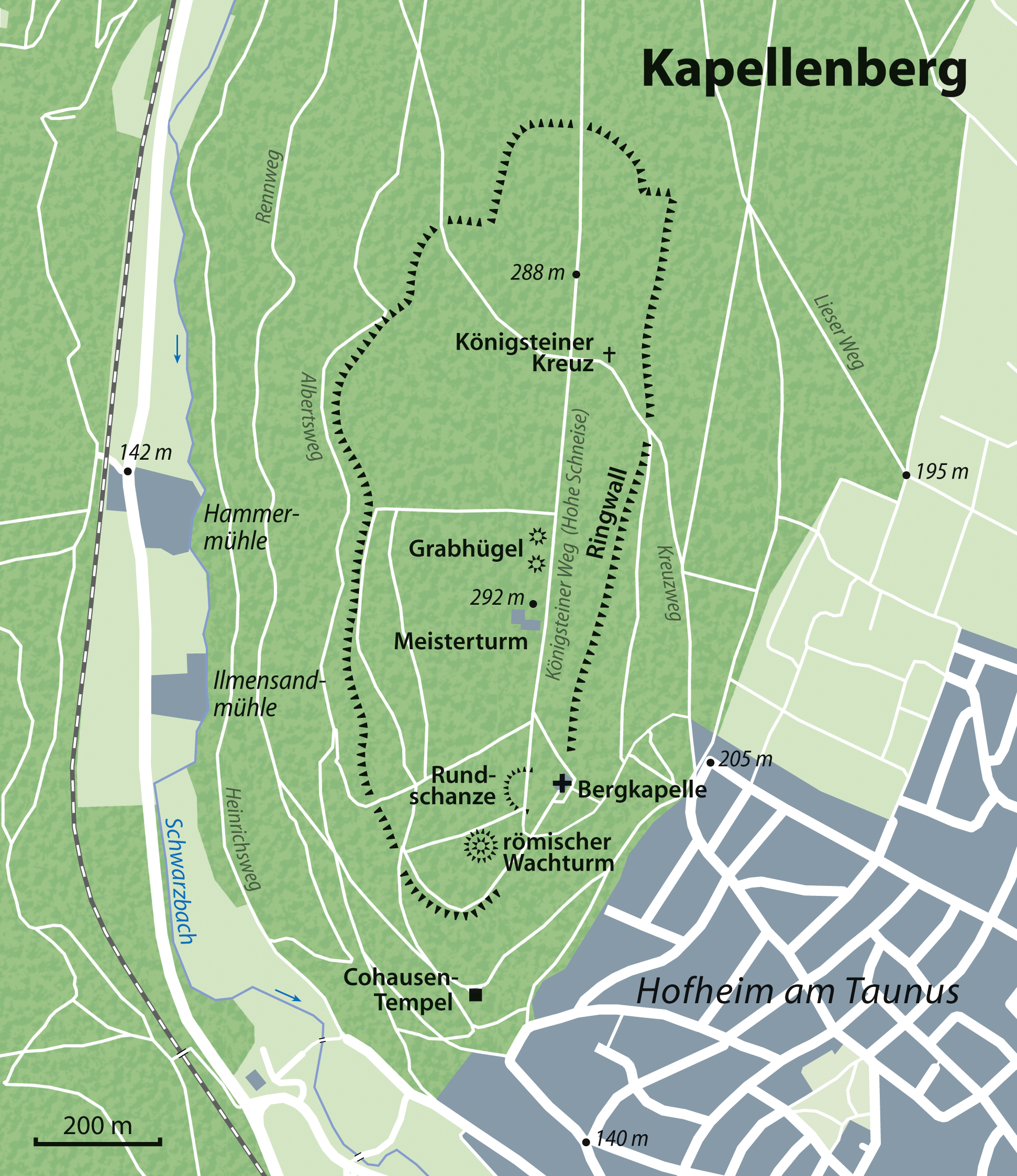
Map of the Kappellenberg ramparts and burial mound

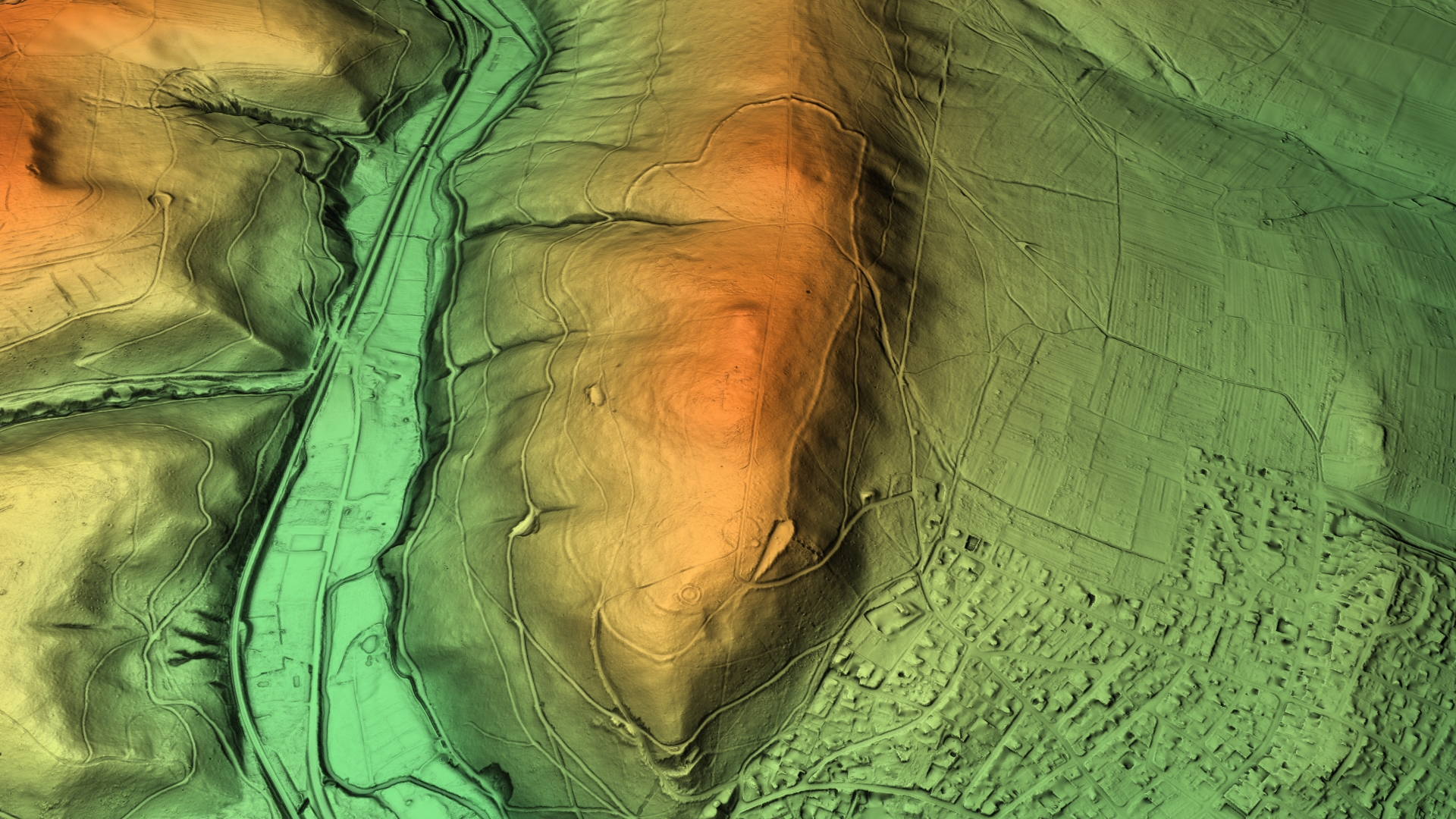
Topography of the Kappellenbrg ramparts

Since 2008, the fortified settlement of Kapellenberg near Hofheim and Frankfurt (one of the largest of the Michelsberg culture) has been investigated by the Römisch-Germanisches Zentralmuseum, Leibniz Archaeological Research Institute. The settlement has been described as representing "the beginnings of urbanism" already in 4000 BC. The overall site was 45 hectares in size with an internal settlement covering 26 hectares, containing numerous rectangular houses and surrounded by a rampart. A large tumulus (burial mound) was built at the centre of the settlement between 4200–4100 BC, indicating the influence of the Castellic culture in Brittany, where giant burial mounds containing megalithic tombs (such as Tumiac and Saint-Michel) were built c. 4500 BC for elite males described by some researchers as 'divine kings'. The Castellic mounds contained large quantities of jade axes (the jade originally imported from the Italian Alps), as well jewellery made from callaïs (variscite and turquoise) imported from south-western Spain. Jade axes have similarly been found at the Kappellenberg, attesting to an exchange network of prestige goods associated with elites as well as the trade in salt. The Kappellenberg tumulus and jade axes indicate that "a socio-political hierarchisation process linked to the emergence of high-ranking elites" was underway in the Rhine valley at the same time as similar developments were occurring in Brittany (Castellic culture) and the Paris basin (Cerny culture).

The settlement at Schierstein might have housed up to several thousand inhabitants. Other large fortified settlements include Urmitz (100-120 ha) and Wiesbaden-Schierstein (~100 ha) in Germany, Ottenburg-Grez-Doiceau (~90 ha) in Belgium, and Mairy (25-40 ha) in France.

== Economy ==
Research so far tends to characterise MK as a culture that avoided or rejected the use of copper, but occasional finds, e.g. at Heilbronn-Klingenberg, do indicate use of the metal.

== Important sites ==
- Kapellenberg
- Schierstein
- Heilbronn-Klingenberg
- Urmitz
- Ilsfeld
- Bruchsal-Aue

=== The type site: Michelsberg hill near Untergrombach ===
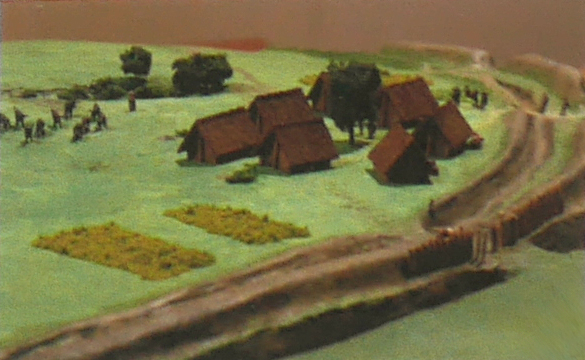
Model of houses and ramparts on the Michelsberg hill

==== Location ====
Michelsberg hill is about 4 km southeast of modern Bruchsal, near the suburb of Untergrombach. The hill rises steeply 160m above the Kraichgau plain, its overall height above sea level is 272m. As the hill is defined by steep slopes on three sides, it is a naturally protected or defensible site.

==== Finds ====
The first discoveries of prehistoric material took place in 1884, systematic excavation began in 1889. Further works took place in the 1950s and 1960s.

The summit plateau, measuring ca 400 x 250m, contained a Neolithic settlement, enclosed by a curvilinear earthwork. Such earthworks have since been recognised as one of the most widespread and typical types of MK monument. The Michelsberg site itself was unusually well-preserved, its interior yielded numerous settlement-related pits. The architecture consisted of daub-covered wooden structures. Remains of a pathway were found in the East of the site.

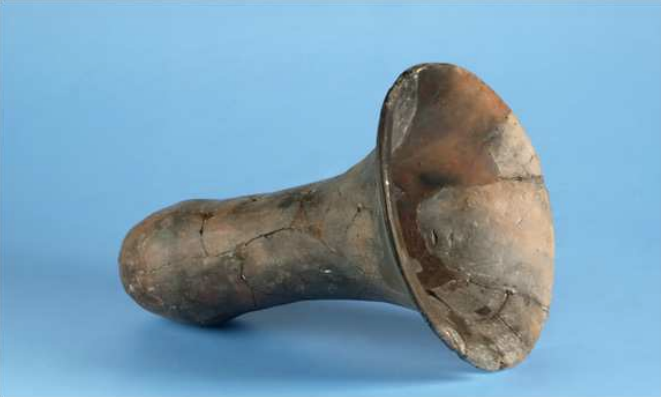
Tulip-shaped beaker

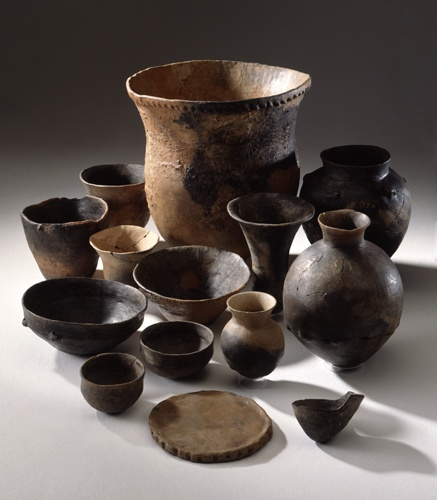
Michelsberg culture ceramics, 3600 BC

Michelsberg pottery is characterised by undecorated pointy-based tulip beakers.

Finds of barley and emmer indicate an agricultural economy. Animal husbandry is indicated by bones of domesticated cattle, pig, sheep and goat. Domestic dogs have also been identified. Bones of deer and fox suggest that the MK diet was supplemented by hunting.

There was no indication of a destruction of the site; nor were there any finds suggesting humans meeting a violent end. Some pits contained the remains of food stores. Thus, the abandonment of the site may have had environmental reasons. A common suggestion is the drying up of the Rhine's arms which used to flow by the bottom of the hill, due to an extensive dry period. As the result of such a change in climate, the area would not have easily supported agriculture any more, forcing human communities (and their livestock) to relocate.

Prehistoric settlement patterns in Central Europe are generally quite volatile. The abandonment of a settlement may be part of a broader economic and social system. Thus, the Bruchsal area appears to contain several earthworks from different phases within MK.

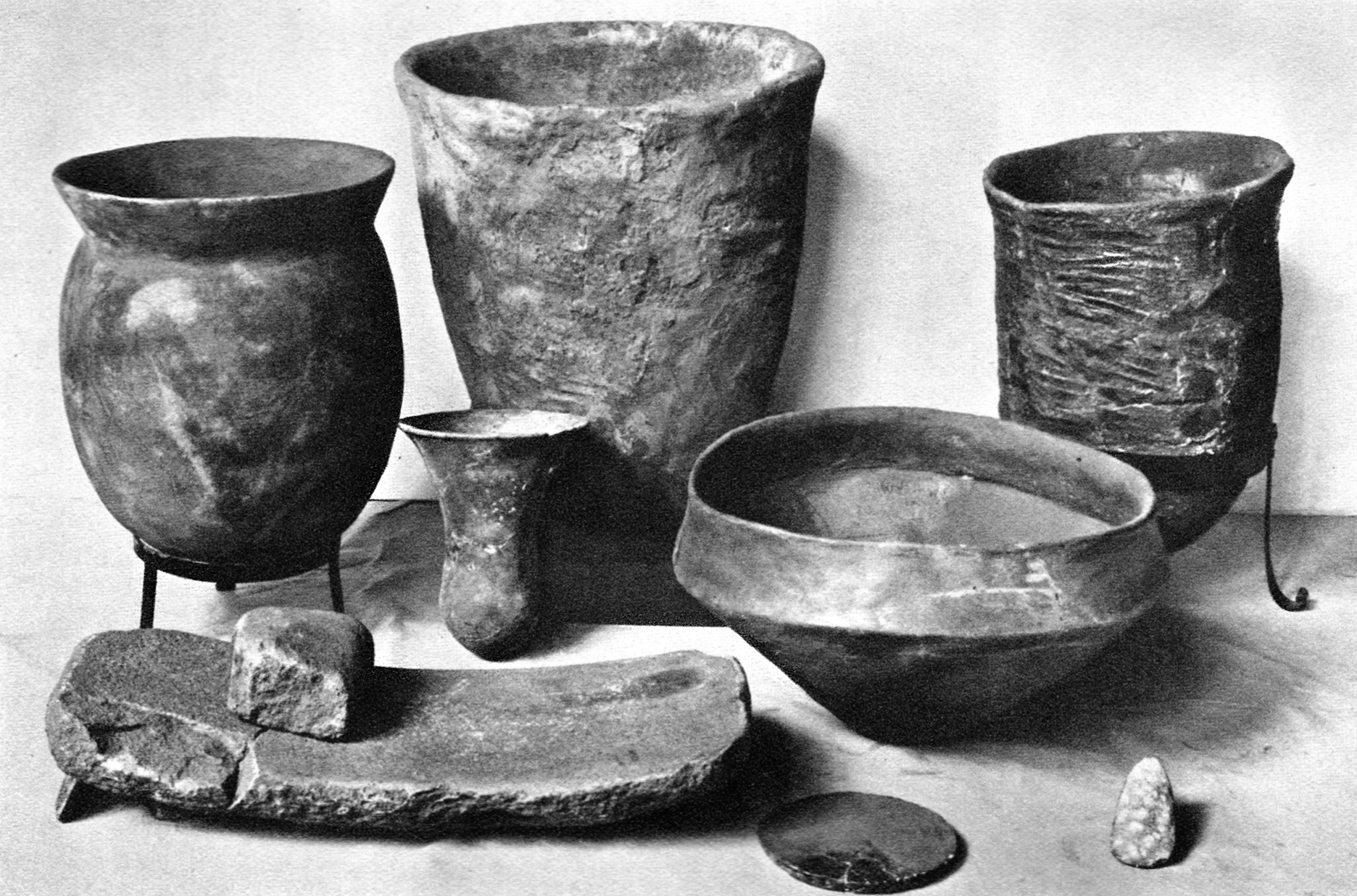
Pottery and grinding stone

== Burial habits ==
Formal Michelsberg burials are recognised rarely. There is no indication of organised burial grounds, as known from the earlier Linear pottery (LBK) and Rössen cultures.

Human skeletal remains, frequently disarticulated, have been found inside pits and ditches in many MK earthworks and have had considerable influence on the interpretation of such structures. Their discussion is closely connected with that of similar remains in the ditches of British Causewayed enclosures.

The MK settlement of Aue yielded eight pit graves, six containing a single individual and two containing several. The age profile of those buried is very striking, as it is limited to children under the age of seven and adults over 50 (a considerable age in Neolithic Europe). In other words, humans of the ages that must have dominated the active social and economic life of the settlement are absent. It has been suggested that their bodies may not have received formal burial, but were disposed of by excarnation, in which case the skeletal remains from rubbish pits may be the result of such activity.

The same may apply to human bones found in the fills of enclosure ditches around MK settlements. It has also been suggested (hypothetically) that partially articulated remains found in such ditches may indicate that graves were placed on the surfaces adjacent to them and later washed into the ditches due to erosion.

Occasionally, earthwork ditches contain more structured deposits of human bone, e.g. adult skeletons surrounded by those of children. Such burials are probably connected to the realms of cult or ritual, as are specific depositions of offerings in some of the ditches, especially at the settlements of Aue and Scheelkopf. Here, ditches contained carefully placed complete vessels, well-preserved quern-stones and the horns of aurochs. The latter had been neatly separated from the skulls, perhaps reflecting a special symbolic significance ascribed to that animal.

A hitherto unknown aspect to MK burial practice is suggested by the recent discovery of MK burials in the Blätterhof cave near Hagen, Westphalia. Here, a full age profile appears to be represented.

An unusual burial was found at Rosheim (Bas-Rhin, France). Here, the fill of a pit contained the crouched remains of an adult woman, her legs leaning against a quernstone. She appeared to have been laid onto a carefully placed packing of clay lumps, mixed with pottery and bones. Her death had been caused by some blunt impact on her skull.

== Genetics ==
Beau et al. 2017 examined the remains 22 Michelsberg people buried at Gougenheim, France. The 21 samples of mtDNA extracted belonged to the maternal haplogroups H (7 samples), K (4 samples), J (2 samples), W (1 samples), N (1 sample), U (3 samples) and T (2 samples). The examined individuals displayed genetic links to earlier farming populations of the Paris Basin, and were genetically very different from previous post-LBK cultures of the region, suggesting that the Michelsberg culture emerged through a migration of people from west. They displayed genetic links to other farmers of Western Europe, and carried substantial amounts of hunter-gatherer ancestry. The authors of the study proposed that migrations of people associated with the Michelsberg culture may have been responsible for the resurgence of hunter-gatherer ancestry observed in Central Europe during the Middle Neolithic.

Lipson et al. 2017 examined the remains of 4 individuals buried c. 4000–3000 BC at the Blätterhöhle site in modern-day Germany, ascribed to the Michelsberg culture and its successor, the Wartberg culture. The 3 samples of Y-DNA extracted belonged to the paternal haplogroups R1b1, R1 and I2a1, while the 4 samples of mtDNA extracted belonged to the maternal haplogroups U5b2a2, J1c1b1, H5 and U5b2b2. The individuals carried the high amount of about 40–50% Western Hunter-Gatherer (WHG) ancestry, with one individual displaying as much as c. 75%

Brunel et al. 2020 examined the remains of 18 individuals ascribed to the Michelsberg culture. The 2 samples of Y-DNA belonged to the paternal haplogroup I, while the 16 samples of mtDNA extracted belonged to types of the maternal haplogroups H (3 samples), K (9 samples), X (1 sample), T (2 samples) and U (1 sample).

== See also ==
- Wartberg culture
- Chasséen culture (4500–3500 BC), a contemporaneous culture in France.

== Bibliography ==
- Rolf-Heiner Behrends: Ein Weg aus der Jungsteinzeit nachgewiesen? In: Archäologische Nachrichten aus Baden 58, 1998, 3–6.
- Beau, Alice; et al. (July 5, 2017). "Multi-scale ancient DNA analyses confirm the western origin of Michelsberg farmers and document probable practices of human sacrifice". PLOS One. 12 (7) e0179742. PLOS. Bibcode:2017PLoSO..1279742B. doi:10.1371/journal.pone.0179742. PMC 5497962. PMID 28678860.
- Brunel, Samantha; et al. (June 9, 2020). "Ancient genomes from present-day France unveil 7,000 years of its demographic history". Proceedings of the National Academy of Sciences of the United States of America. 117 (23). National Academy of Sciences: 12791–12798. Bibcode:2020PNAS..11712791B. doi:10.1073/pnas.1918034117. PMC 7293694. PMID 32457149.
- Darvill, Timothy, ed. (2009). "Michelsberg Culture". The Concise Oxford Dictionary of Archaeology (3 ed.). Oxford University Press. doi:10.1093/acref/9780199534043.001.0001. ISBN 978-0-19-172713-9.
- Immel, Alexander; et al. (November 21, 2019). "Neolithic genomes reveal a distinct ancient HLA allele pool and population transformation in Europe". bioRxiv 10.1101/851188.
- Lipson, Mark; et al. (November 8, 2017). "Parallel palaeogenomic transects reveal complex genetic history of early European farmers". Nature. 551 (7680). Nature Research: 368–372. Bibcode:2017Natur.551..368L. doi:10.1038/nature24476. PMC 5973800. PMID 29144465.
- Price, T. Douglas (2015). Ancient Scandinavia: An Archaeological History from the First Humans to the Vikings. Oxford University Press. ISBN 978-0-19-023197-2.
- Ernst Probst: Deutschland in der Steinzeit. München 1991.
- Jens Lüning: Die Michelsberger Kultur. Ihre Funde in zeitlicher und räumlicher Gliederung. In: Berichte der Römisch-Germanischen Kommission 48, 1967 (1968) 1-350.
- Jens Lüning: Die Entwicklung der Keramik beim Übergang vom Mittel- zum Jungneolithikum im süddeutschen Raum. In Berichte der Römisch-Germanischen Kommission 50, 1969 (1971) 1–95.
- Robert Koch: Das Erdwerk der Michelsbergerkultur auf dem Hetzenberg bei Heilbronn-Neckargartach. (Forschungen und Berichte zur Vor- und Frühgeschichte in Baden-Württemberg, Band 3/1) Stuttgart: Theiss 2005. ISBN 3-8062-1640-1.
- Jörg Biel, Helmut Schlichtherle, Michael Strobel u. Andrea Zeeb (ed.), Die Michelsberger Kultur und ihre Randgebiete - Probleme der Entstehung, Chronologie und des Siedlungswesens. Kolloquium Hemmenhofen 21.‒23. Februar 1997. Materialhefte zur Archäologie in Baden-Württemberg 43 (Stuttgart 1998).
- Shennan, Stephen (2018). The First Farmers of Europe: An Evolutionary Perspective. Cambridge World Archaeology. Cambridge University Press. doi:10.1017/9781108386029. ISBN 978-1-108-42292-5.
- Susanne Reiter, Die Keramik der Michelsberger Grabenanlage von Bruchsal Aue, Theiss Verlag (2002), ISBN 3-8062-1739-4.
- Hassler, Michael (Hrsg.): Der Michaelsberg. Naturkunde und Geschichte des Untergrombacher Hausbergs. Beihefte zu den Veröffentlichungen für Naturschutz und Landschaftspflege in Baden-Württemberg, Bd. 90. Verlag Regionalkultur, Ubstadt-Weiher 1998. ISBN 978-3-929366-78-5
