= Michaelsberg (Cleebronn) =

Mountain in Baden-Württemberg, Germany

Coordinates: 49°02′20″N 9°02′50″E

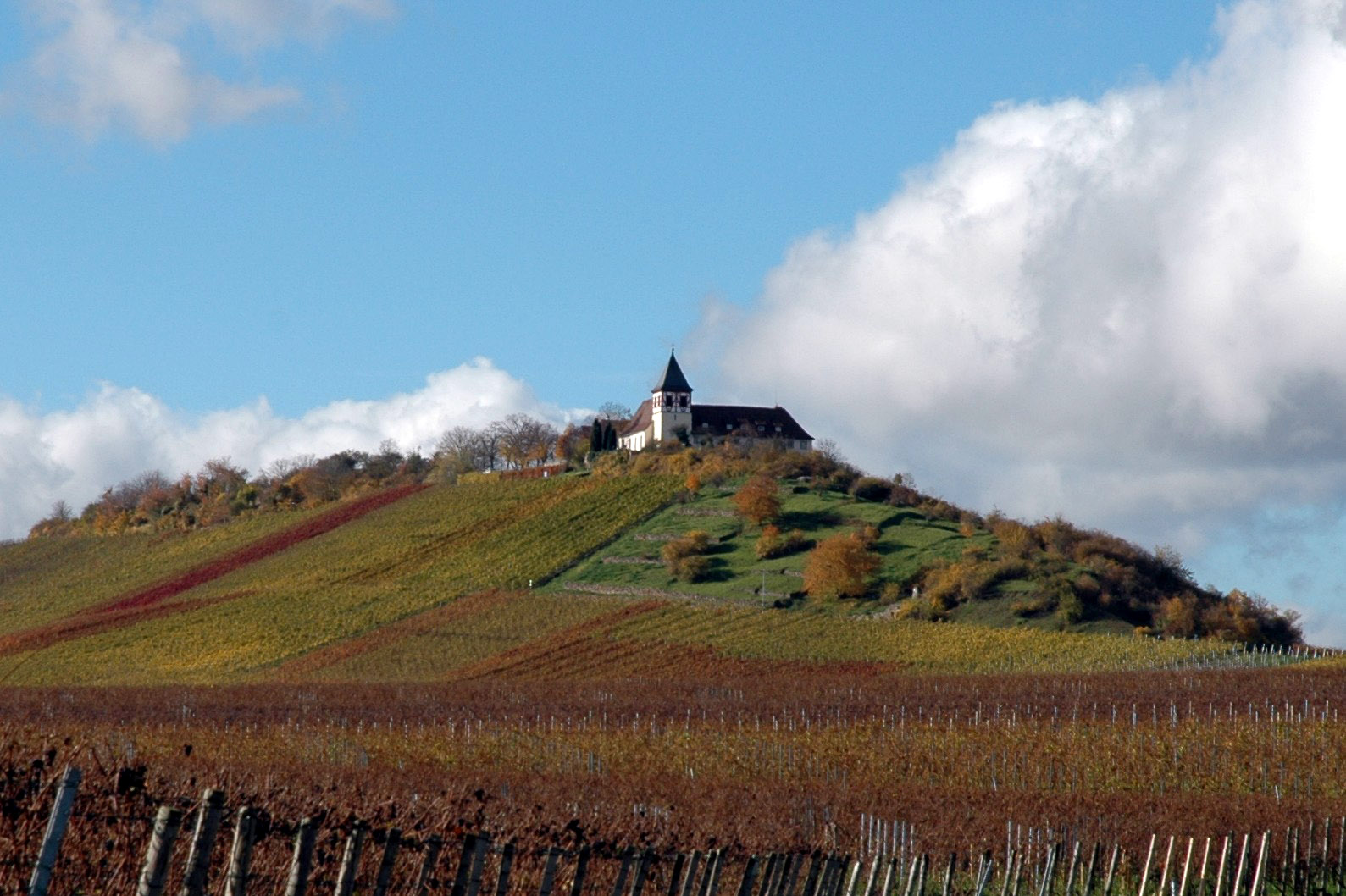

Highest point
- Elevation: 394 m (1,293 ft)

Geography
- Location: Baden-Württemberg, Germany

Michaelsberg (Cleebronn) is a mountain located in the Zabergäu region of Baden-Württemberg, Germany. It is a conical hill with a height of 394 meters (1,293 ft).
