= Michaelsberg (Untergrombach) =

Mountain in Baden-Württemberg, Germany

Coordinates: 49°05′16″N 8°33′42″E

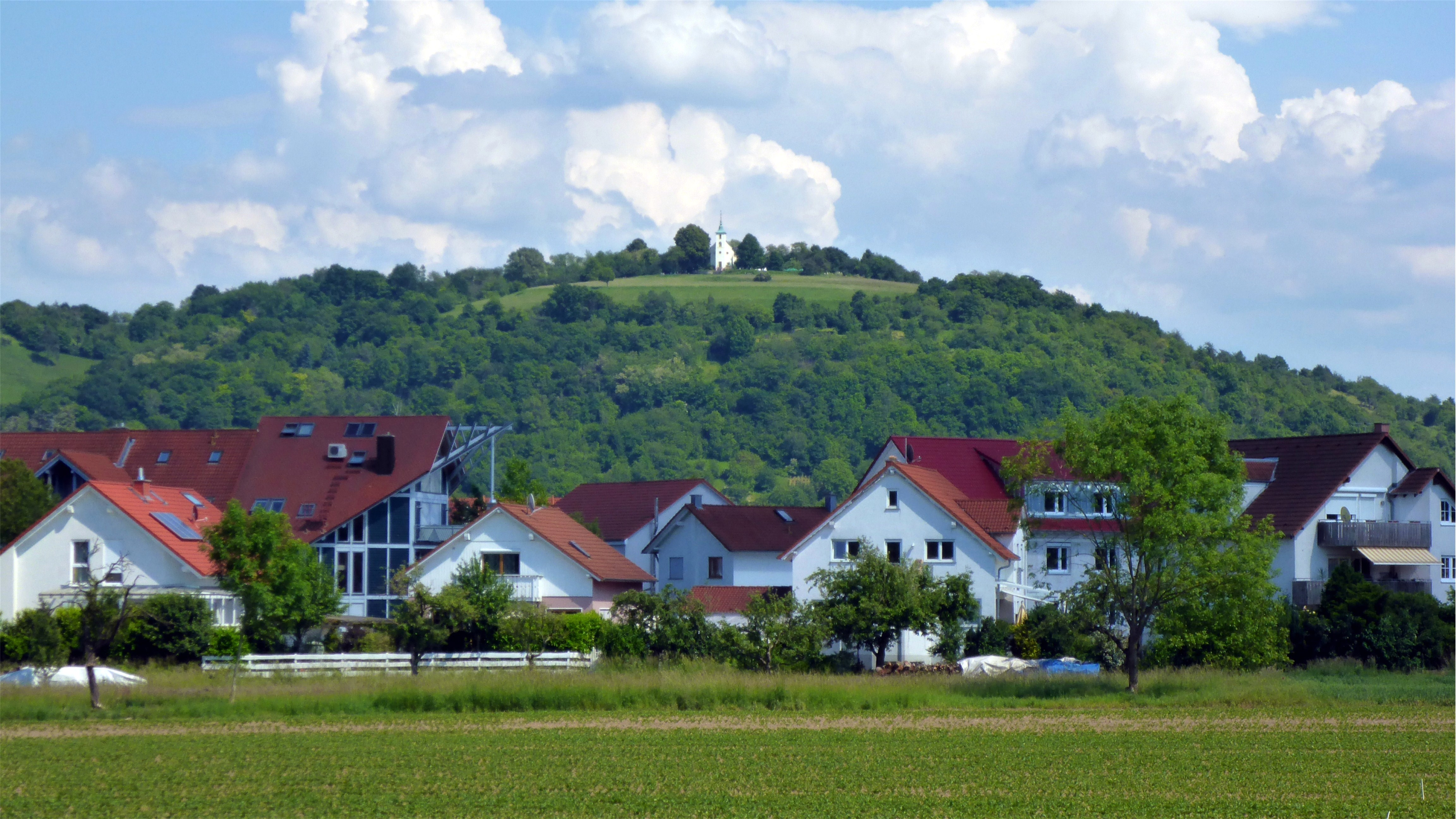
- The Michaelsberg from the West

Highest point
- Elevation: 269 m (883 ft)

Geography
- Location: Baden-Württemberg, Germany

The Michaelsberg is a hill at Untergrombach near Bruchsal in Baden-Württemberg, Germany. A Neolithic settlement has been excavated at the top. It is the type site for the Michelsberg culture.
