= Ferdinand Keller (archaeologist) =

Swiss archaeologist

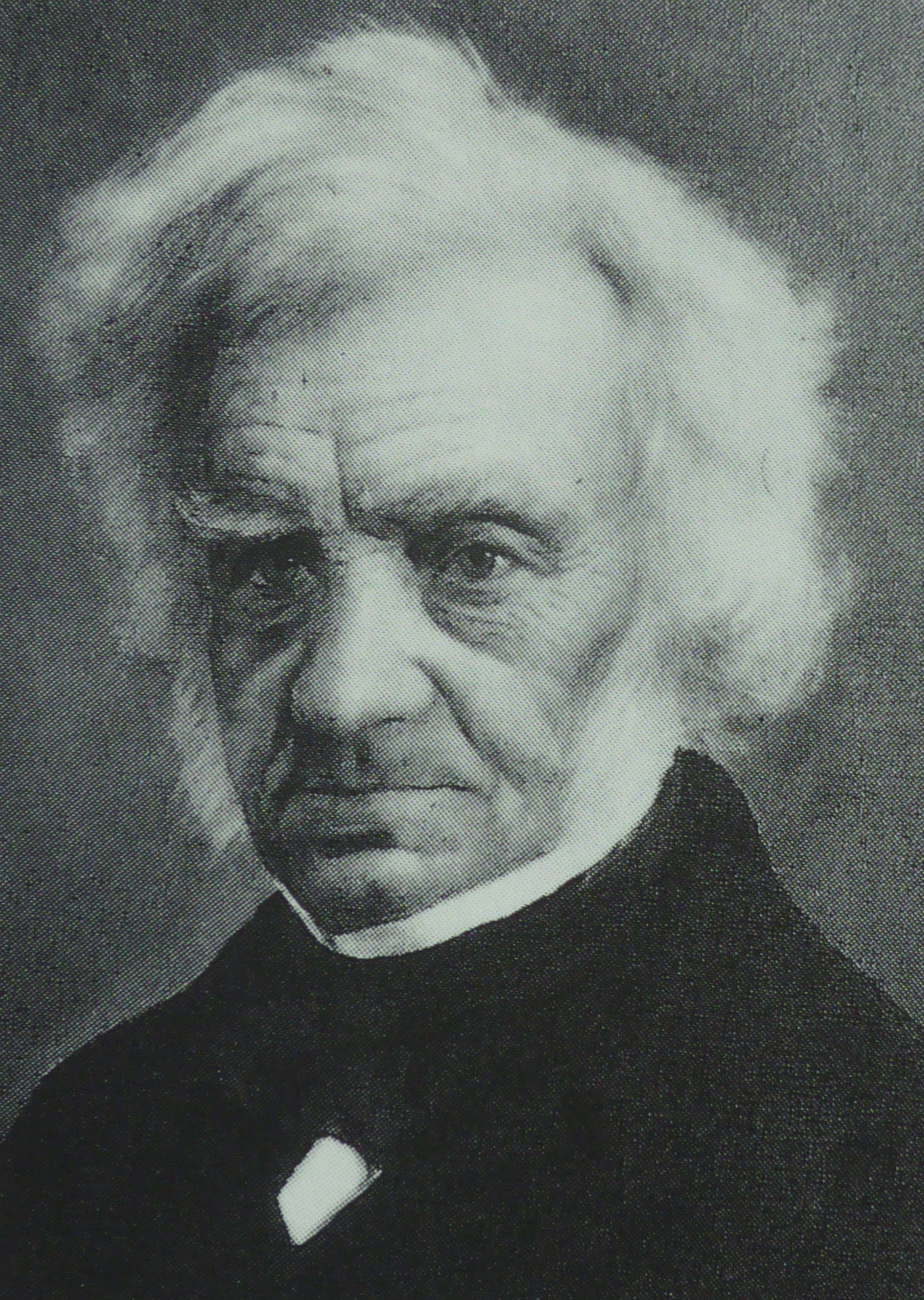
- Ferdinand Keller
- Born: December 24, 1800
- Died: June 21, 1881 (aged 80)
- Known for: Prehistoric pile dwellings around the Alps
- Scientific career
- Fields: Archaeology

Ferdinand Keller (December 24, 1800 – June 21, 1881) was a Swiss archaeologist. He is mainly known for his investigations of Swiss lake dwellings in 1853–54, and work on the remains of the La Tène culture. He is the founder of the Antiquarische Gesellschaft in Zürich (Antiquarian Society in Zurich).

== Biography ==
He was born at Marthalen. He studied theology and natural sciences at Zurich, Lausanne, and Paris. In 1831 he was made an instructor at Zurich, and secretary of the Society for Natural Research, and in this capacity he published various works on naked rock soil and vent holes. The discovery of the sepulchral mound at Burghölzli led to the founding of the Antiquarian Society of which Keller was the longtime president, and to the founding of a museum, the growth of which was largely due to him. His most important discovery was the pile dwelling Meilen–Rorenhaab in the winter of 1853, and in later years the settlements Zürich–Enge Alpenquai, Kleiner Hafner and Grosser Hafner. In 1857 a skeleton wearing bronze jewelry was unearthed near Robenhausen, and Jakob Messikommer who later discovered and researched the Wetzikon-Robenhausen settlement, reported the findings to Keller. Keller encouraged him to search for prehistoric remains. The American Philosophical Society elected Keller an international member in 1863.

== Works ==
His articles on the pile dwelling were published in the proceedings of the Antiquarian Society. He also published Bauriss des Klosters Sankt Gallen vom Jahr 820 (1844), and an archaeological map of Eastern Switzerland (1874).

== See also ==
- Prehistoric pile dwellings around Zürichsee
