= Antiquarische Gesellschaft in Zürich =

Coordinates: 47°23′50″N 8°32′49″E

The Antiquarische Gesellschaft in Zürich (Antiquarian Society of Zürich), often shortened to Antiquarische or AGZ, is an association concerned with the study and preservation of the history of the canton of Zürich. The society has its headquarters next to the public records of Zürich.

== History ==
The society was founded in 1832 by Ferdinand Keller as a scholarly society of the urban middle class. Despite being merely a private association, it was granted a near monopoly on the findings of archaeological excavations by both the city and canton. Since 1837 the AGZ has published its reports annually. In 1887 Jakob Messikommer (1828–1917) who discovered and researched the prehistoric settlement Wetzikon–Robenhausen at Robenhausen established a regional section. 1862, the society initiated the Schweizerisches Idiotikon.

== Objective ==
Quote: Die Antiquarische Gesellschaft versteht sich als Brücke zwischen der Geschichtswissenschaft und einer an historischen Fragen interessierten Öffentlichkeit. (The Antiquarische Gesellschaft aims to be a bridge between the science of history and the historical enquiries of the interested public.)

To further this aim the society organises lectures, which usually take place in the winter; excursions, often in the summer or autumn; and guidance to researchers. The publications of the society rank alongside the Zürich Taschenbuch as the most important and valuable reference works for historians of Zürich to consult. The autumn lectures have become highly valued for the opportunity they present for the museums of Zürich to exchange information and ideas. In recent years the society has placed primary focus on conserving and restoring historical artifacts and archives.
