= Zürcher Oberländer =

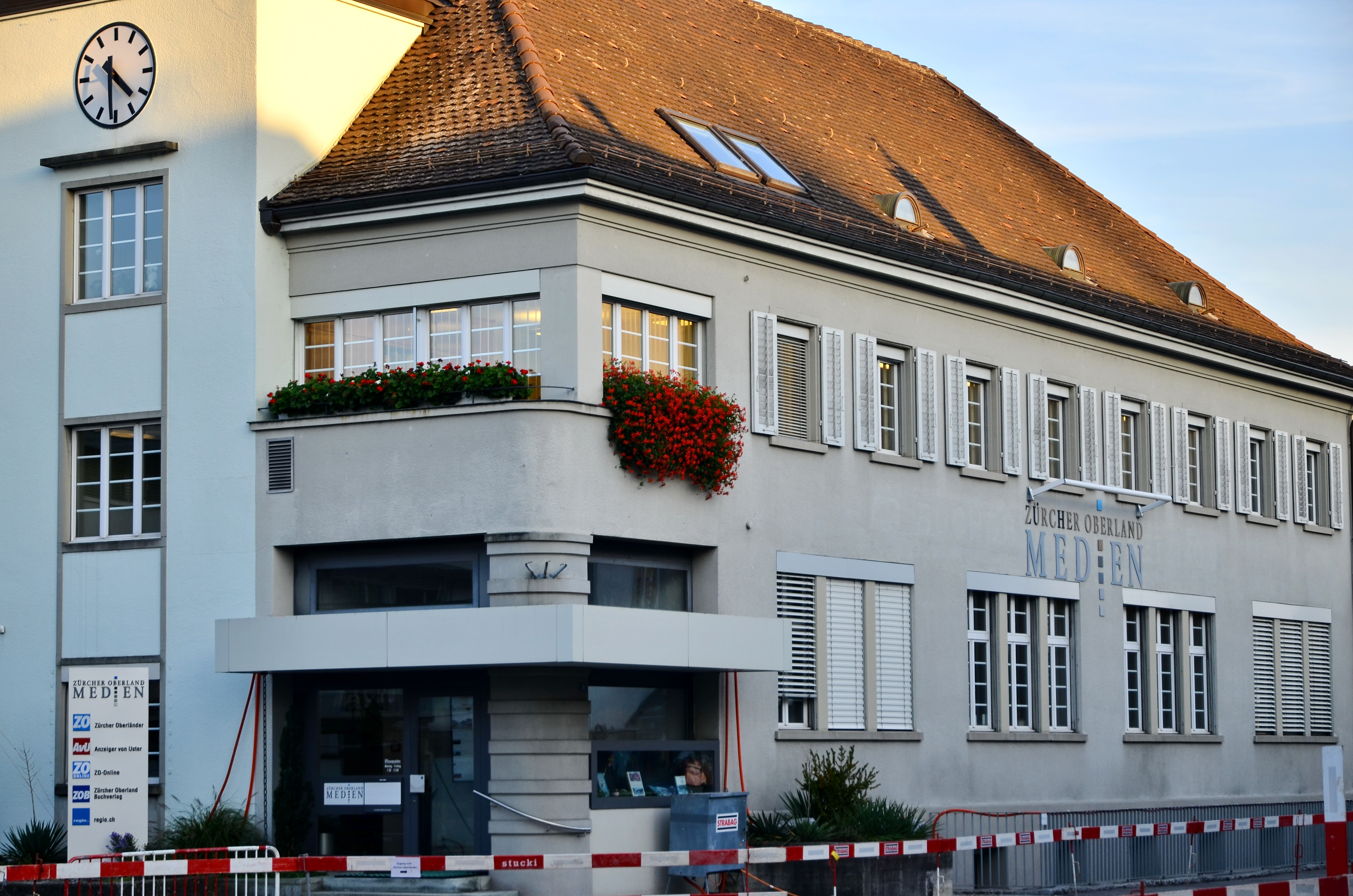
- Newspaper building in Wetzikon
- Type: Daily newspaper
- Owner: Zürcher Oberland Medien AG
- Founded: • 1852 (as Almann) • 1870 (as Der Freisinnige) • 1960 (name changed to Zürcher Oberländer)
- Language: German
- Headquarters: Wetzikon
- Country: Switzerland
- Circulation: 30,526 (as of October 2013)
- Website: zueriost.ch

Zürcher Oberländer (Swiss Standard German pronunciation: [ˈtsʏrçər ˈoːbərland]), commonly shortened to ZOL, is a Swiss German-language daily newspaper, published in Wetzikon.

== History and profile ==
Allmann, founded in 1852 in Hinwil, was the earliest predecessor of the as of today Zürcher Oberländer. Allmann in which Jakob Messikommer published a poem, was adopted by the printing office Buchdruckerei Wetzikon AG (as of today Zürcher Oberland Medien AG), which was founded by liberals in 1870, and renamed in Der Freisinnige.

It was published daily starting 1912 and in 1960 merged with the "Volksblatt vom Bachtel which was founded in 1861. It was called now Zürcher Oberländer, but kept under the chief editors Karl Eckinger (1943–1972) and Oskar Fritschi (1972–2004) his liberal orientation.

Following the acquisition of the newspapers Tagblatt des Distrikts Pfäffikon (1972) and the Anzeigers von Uster (1996), ZO reached a leading position in the districts Hinwil, Pfäffikon and Uster. The as before independent Anzeiger von Uster newspaper was integrated as local part of Zürcher Oberländer for the Uster district.

IN 2010, The Tamedia AG acquired a minority stake of 38%, and ZO was integrated into their Zürcher Regionalzeitungen division, claimed to be of compound of the Zürich regional newspapers, in 2011. 1966 the edition occurred 14,330, 23,348 in 1975 and in 2012 32,196 copies.

Zürcher Oberländer describes itself as economic and journalistic independent. It is the official publication media for 20 municipalities in the districts of Hinwil, Pfäffikon and Uster.
