= Jakob Messikommer =

Swiss archaeologist

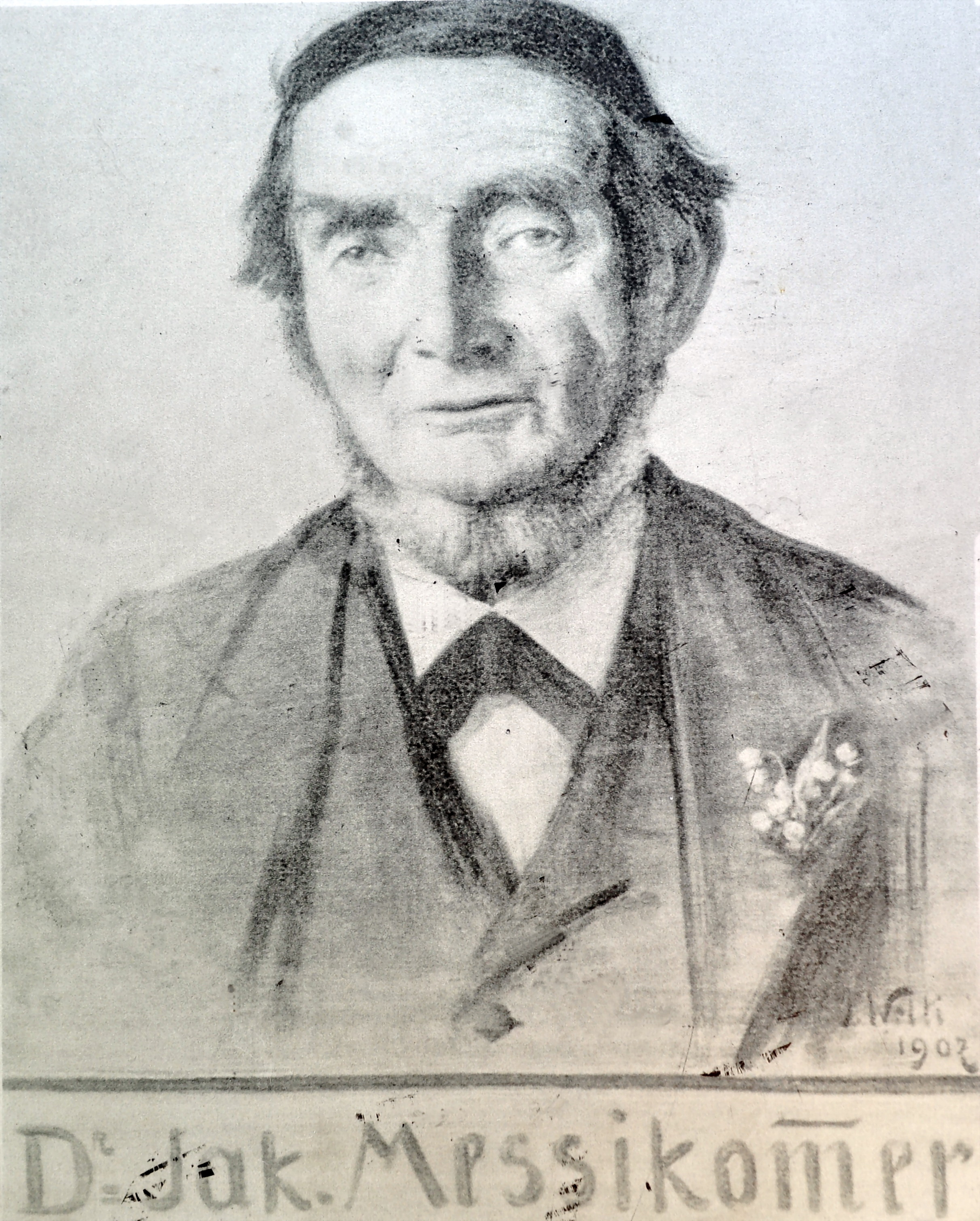
- Dr. Jak. Messikommer, 1902 portrait by J. Welti
- Born: 18 August 1828; Wetzikon, Switzerland
- Died: 23 August 1917 (aged 89); Wetzikon, Switzerland
- Monuments: Messikommer Eich at Robenhausen
- Occupations: Swiss farmer and archaeologist
- Years active: 1857–1917
- Notable work: discovered and researched the UNESCO serial site Wetzikon–Robenhausen
- Spouse(s): Barbara Wismer by first marriage, Babette Messikommer by second marriage
- Awards: Dr. hc. phil I by University of Zurich

Jakob Messikommer (18 August 1828 – 23 August 1917) was a Swiss archaeologist who among others discovered and researched the UNESCO serial site Wetzikon–Robenhausen.

== Biography ==
=== Personal life ===
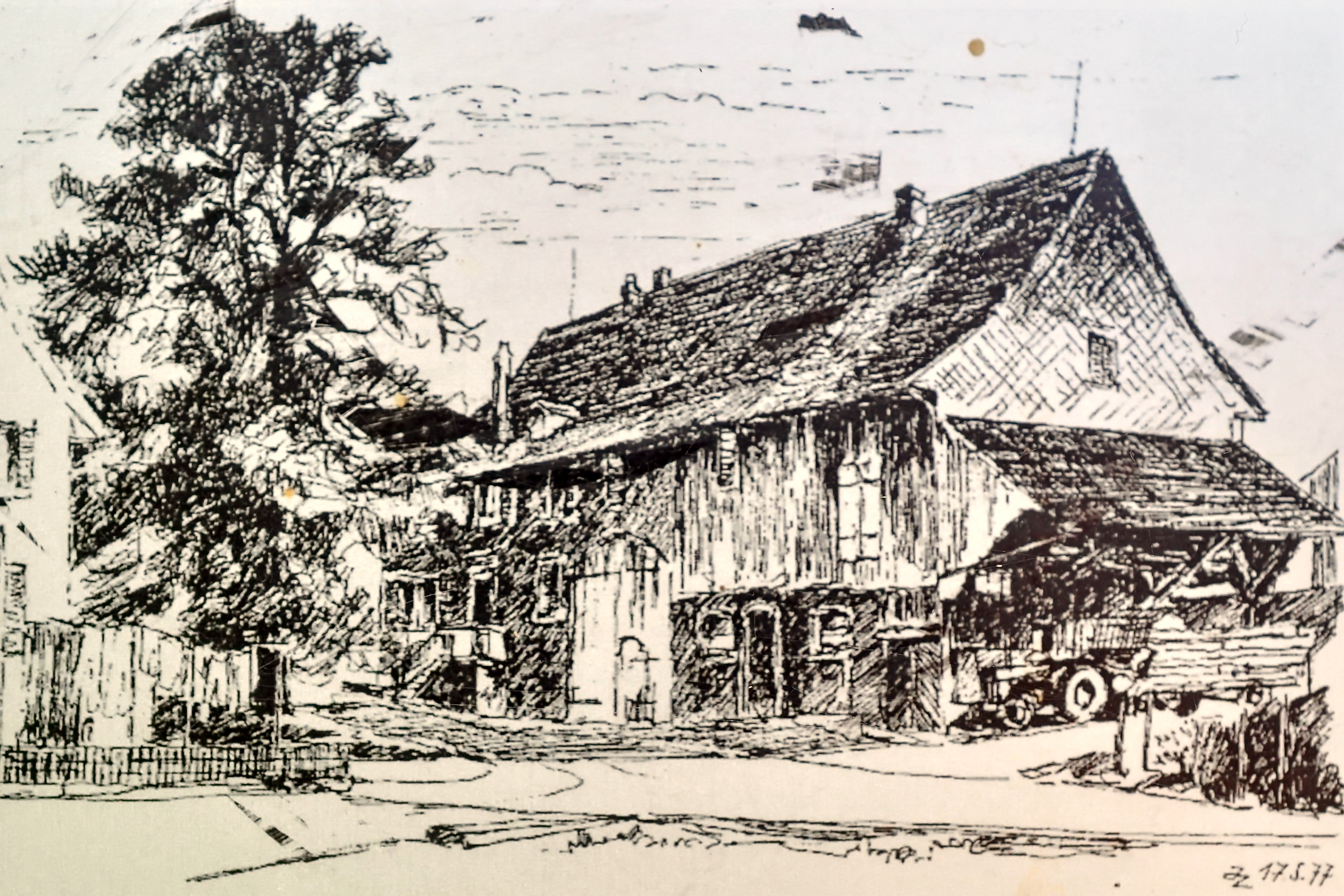
Messikommer's birthplace on a drawing by Jakob Zollinger, dated 17 May 1877

Born in the hamlet of Stegen in Wetzikon as the son of Barbara née Wismer and the farmer Hans-Jakob, Jakob Messikommer attended Sekundarschule (pre-college level) in Wetzikon in 1843/44. As his father died in 1843, Messikommer had to manage the family's farm. Messikommer had the civil rights of the neighboring municipality of Seegräben. Encyclopædia Britannica mentions about his youth: Messikomer dug peat for his mother’s kitchen fire, he dreamed of finding remains of the Helvetii, the Celtic inhabitants of Swiss lands whom Julius Caesar described. At the age of 22, he met the poet Jakob Stutz, and wrote his first poem published a year later in "Allmann", the predecessor of the present regional newspaper Zürcher Oberländer. In 1854 Messikommer published Die Kappeler Milchsuppe, a play in four acts.

In 1856 Jakob Messikommer was appointed as member of the school board. On 12 January 1861 Messikommer married Barbara Wismer from Mädikon; they were parents of Jakob (1857–1879) and two further sons who died as babies, but Barbara Messikommer died on 10 April 1861 after her fourth child died some days before. On 26 May 1862 Messikommer married his second wife Babette Mäder from Illnau. As Babette Messikommer died on 25 November 1889, their surviving daughter Anna (1865–1901) was ill, Jakob Messikommer was overwhelmed, also due to inundation with work, and his son Heinrich (1864–?) was not interested in taking over the farm, but certainly assisted his father's archaeological work. That's why he sold his farm to a neighbor on 26 September 1890, excluded the lands at the Robenhausen site where Messikommer had established the analogy to a present archaeological open air museum. By discovering and exploring the then usually named "stilt house settlement Robenhausen" within the Robenhausen wetlands on Pfäffikersee, Messikommer became famous from the 1860s far beyond the Swiss borders. Jakob Messikommer died after recently malaise on 23 August 1917 in Wetzikon.

=== A farmer becomes a renowned archaeologist ===
As the only son of a peasant family, Messikommer cultivated his mother's and father's farm in Wetzikon. In 1855 he founded an agricultural association. The young farmer started to cultivate reed land at the so-called Himmerich area where Messikommer annually cultivated 30 to 40 loads of peat in the 1850s. A year later, there he found a mandible, in 1857 an arrowhead which he described in his biographical notes as his "first find from the Pfahlbautenzeit", a then popular term for pile-dwelling settlements. These two discoveries aroused his curiosity and passion for further research. In 1857 he directed on government request the excavations for slate at the so-called Schöneich area; due to its soundings later arose the slate coal mine Schöneich. In 1857 a skeleton wearing bronze jewelry was unearthed, and Messikomer reported the findings; Ferdinand Keller encouraged him to search for prehistoric remains around Pfäffikersee. Messikommer operated for two years on behalf of Professor Arnold Escher von der Linth in the preparation of the geological map of the Allman and the Hörnli mountain chains.

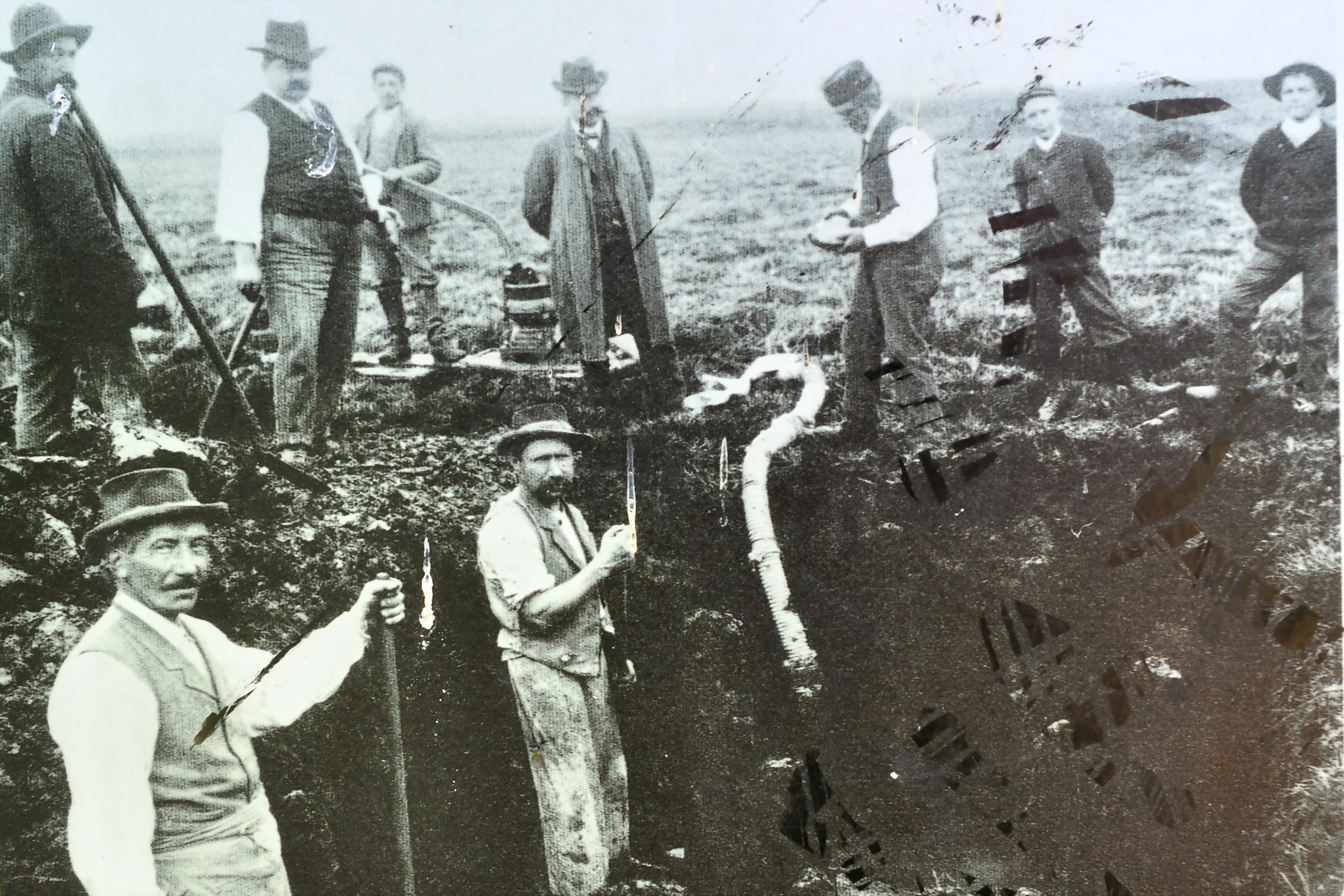
Excavations around 1900 on Wetzikon–Robenhausen

On 2 February 1858 Jakob Messikommer discovered piles at low water level on Pfäffikersee lake shore, and thus initiated the systematic exploration of the settlement Wetzikon-Robenhausen whose research he headed to the 1890s. Due to his reputation by his discoveries in Robenhausen, Messikommer was consulted by the canton of Thurgau to research "Pfahbauten" on Bodensee: 1861 on its Untersee area and 1862 during excavations in Niederwil. In 1865 Messikommer succeeded the dating of finds at Irgenhausen, because of his experience in the dating of peat and by consulting concurrent findings at the Irgenhausen Castrum. Two years later he sent an assortment of new finds from Greifensee to the World Exhibition in Paris, to be honored with a bronze medal. In 1872 he was charged by the government to explore the Hinwil District and the upper Tösstal region for the geological map of Switzerland. Two years later Messikommer suspected, quite rightly, that the human remains in the so-called Renntierhöhle (literally "Reindeer cave") at Thayngen were older than his recent Neolithic discoveries.

While working again at Arbon on behalf of the Thurgau historical society, he discovered the remains of a Roman watchtower. In the NZZ newspaper, Messikommer published some contributions about "Das Gebiet in Wetzikon in prähistorischer Zeit", by explaining his recent archaeological perceptions to a wide audience. In 1887 Messikommer became co-founder of the Wetzikon section of the Antiquarische Gesellschaft in Zürich. On occasion of the construction works of the so-called Seeuferanlage on Zürichsee lake shore, Messikommer was charged to examine the remains of stilt houses in Zürich-Wollishofen. In 1894 Messikommer scientifically demonstrated that the "lake-dwellers" in Robenhausen already knew metal when he found a casting tray with remains of copper. In the same year other excavations were executed, again at Arbon on behalf of the Thurgau historical association: lakeside pile dwelling about one kilometer away from the Untersee lake shore. During excavations at the Burg hil at Robank, a locality of Wetzikon, Messikommer discovered a cremation ground, and the remains of grave urns. In 1891 Jakob Messikommer started regular scientific records by establishing the chronicle of the municipality of Wetzikon, and in 1897 he was a co-founder of the Antiquarian Society.

== Appreciation of his work ==
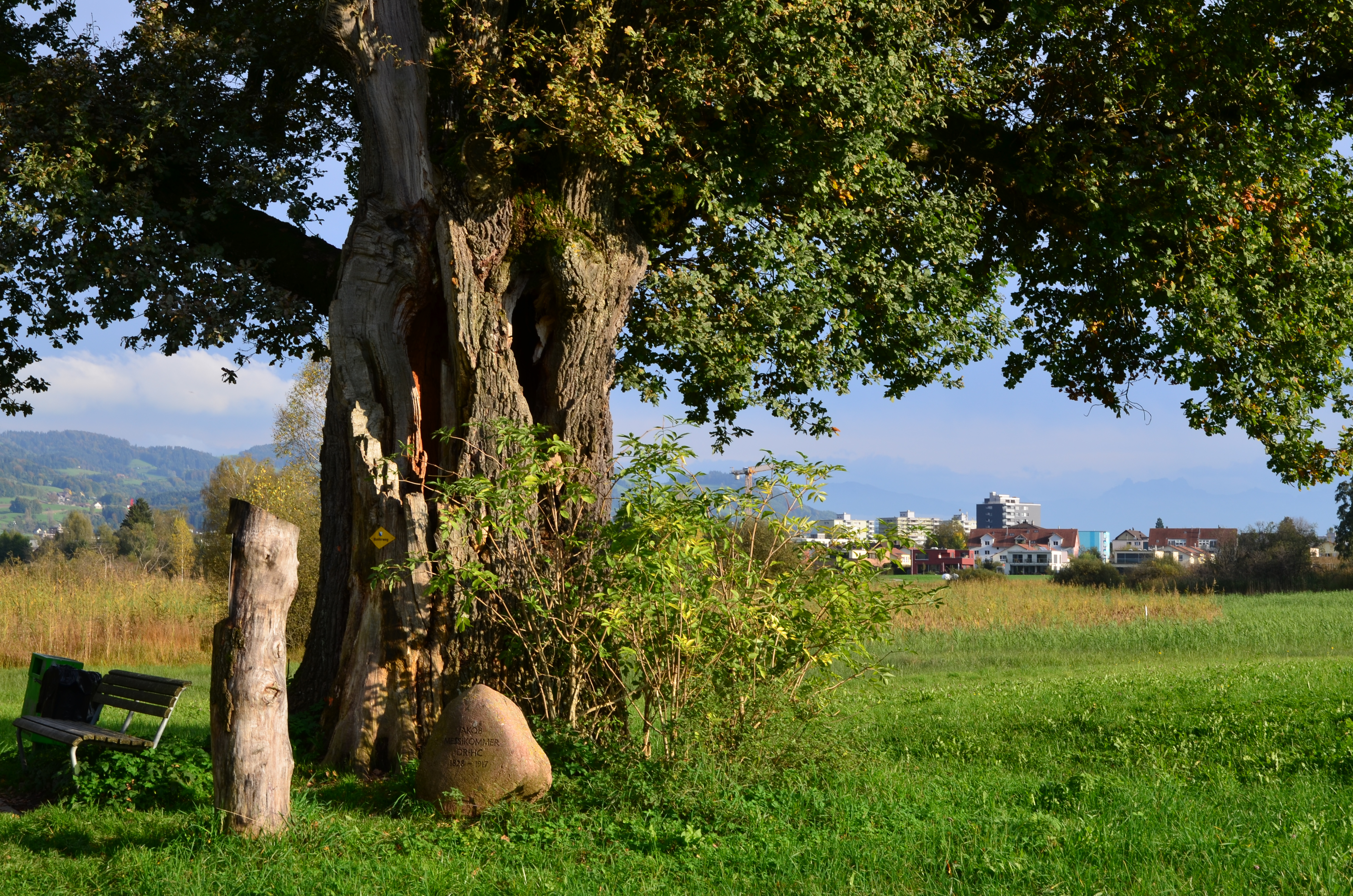
Messikommer Eich

On 29 April 1893 Jakob Messikommer received an honorary doctorate from the philosophical faculty of the University of Zürich, for his achievements to the prehistoric archaeology. The Antiquarian Society inaugurated at the site of his first finds on Robenhauser Ried a memorial stone made of red Sernifit from the Sernftal in Glarus on 22 May 1926. In 2010 the so-called Messikommer Eich, an assumably more-than-500-year-old oak at the same site, was supplemented by a display board. A year later, Jakob Messikommer's Neolithic settlements Wetzikon-Robenhausen became one of the 111 serial sites of the UNESCO World Heritage Site Prehistoric pile dwellings around the Alps, of which are 56 located in Switzerland.

== See also ==
- Prehistoric pile dwellings around Zürichsee
- Robenhausen

== Publications ==
- Pfahlbau Robenhausen, Bericht des Herrn Messikomer. In: Mitteilungen der Antiquarischen Gesellschaft in Zürich, Zürich 1913.

== Literature ==
- Peter J. Suter, Helmut Schlichtherle et al.: Pfahlbauten – Palafittes – Palafitte. Palafittes, Biel 2009, ISBN 978-3-906140-84-1.
- Pfahlbaufieber. Von Antiquaren, Pfahlbaufischern, Altertümerhändlern und Pfahlbaumythen. Mitteilungen der Antiquarischen Gesellschaft in Zürich, volume 71. Chronos, Zürich 2004, ISBN 978-3-0340-0672-9
- Kurt R. Altorfer, Renata Huber et al.: Die prähistorischen Feuchtbodensiedlungen am Südrand des Pfäffikersees : eine archäologische Bestandesaufnahme der Stationen Wetzikon-Robenhausen und Wetzikon-Himmerich. In: Monographien der Kantonsarchäologie Zürich 41. Published by Baudirektion Kanton Zürich, Amt für Raumentwicklung, Kantonsarchäologie, Zürich 2000/2010, ISBN 978-3-9056-8159-8.
