= Robenhausen =

Coordinates: 47°20′9.05″N 8°47′8.16″E

Robenhausen is a locality in Wetzikon, one of the municipalities of the canton of Zürich, Switzerland. The wetland Robenhauser Ried belongs to the protected area surrounding Pfäffikersee. The prehistoric pile dwelling around Lake Zurich Wetzikon-Robenhausen is part of the UNESCO-defined World Heritage Sites, the prehistoric pile dwellings around the Alps.

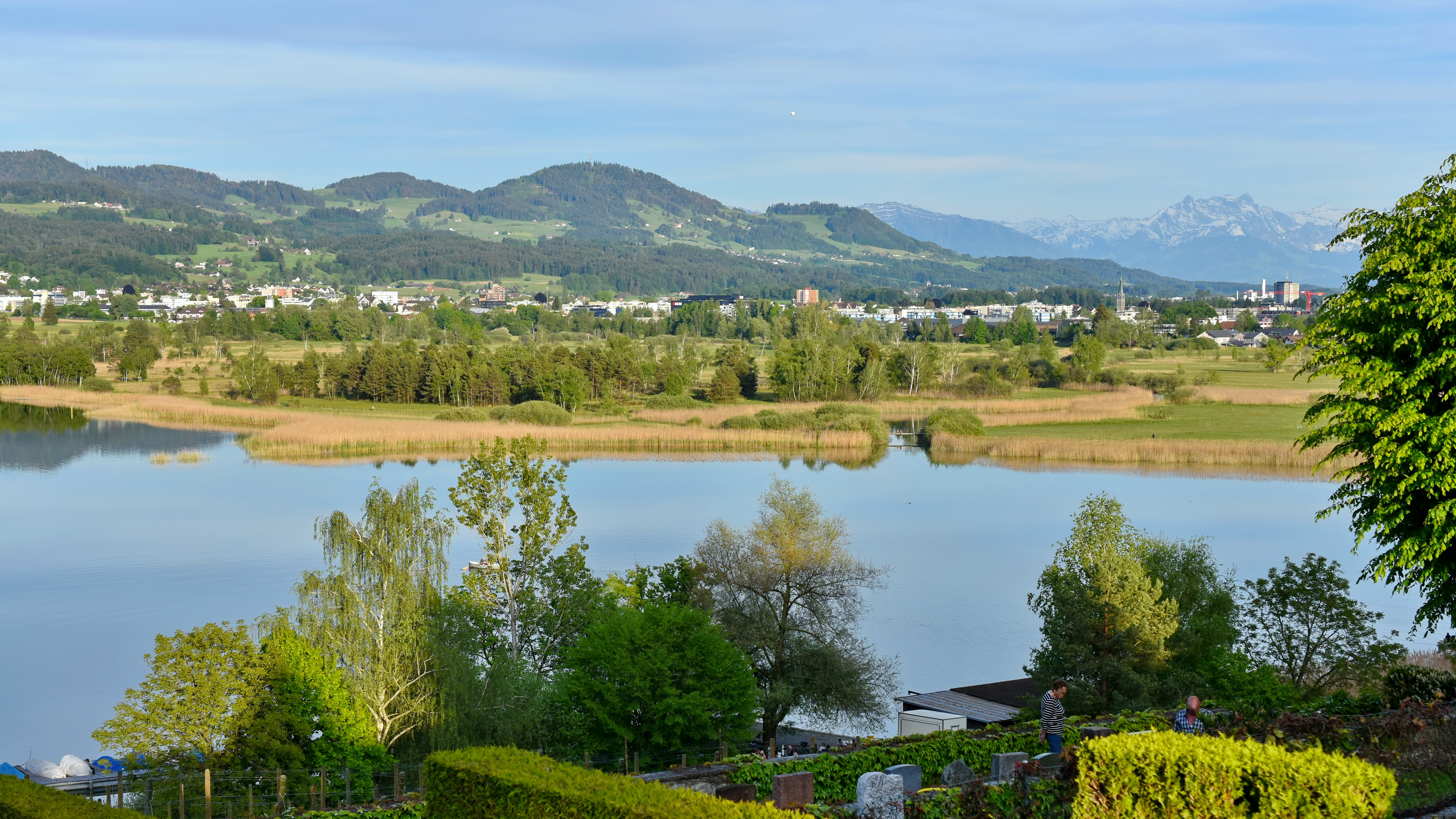
Robenhausen towards Wetzikon, as seen from the south

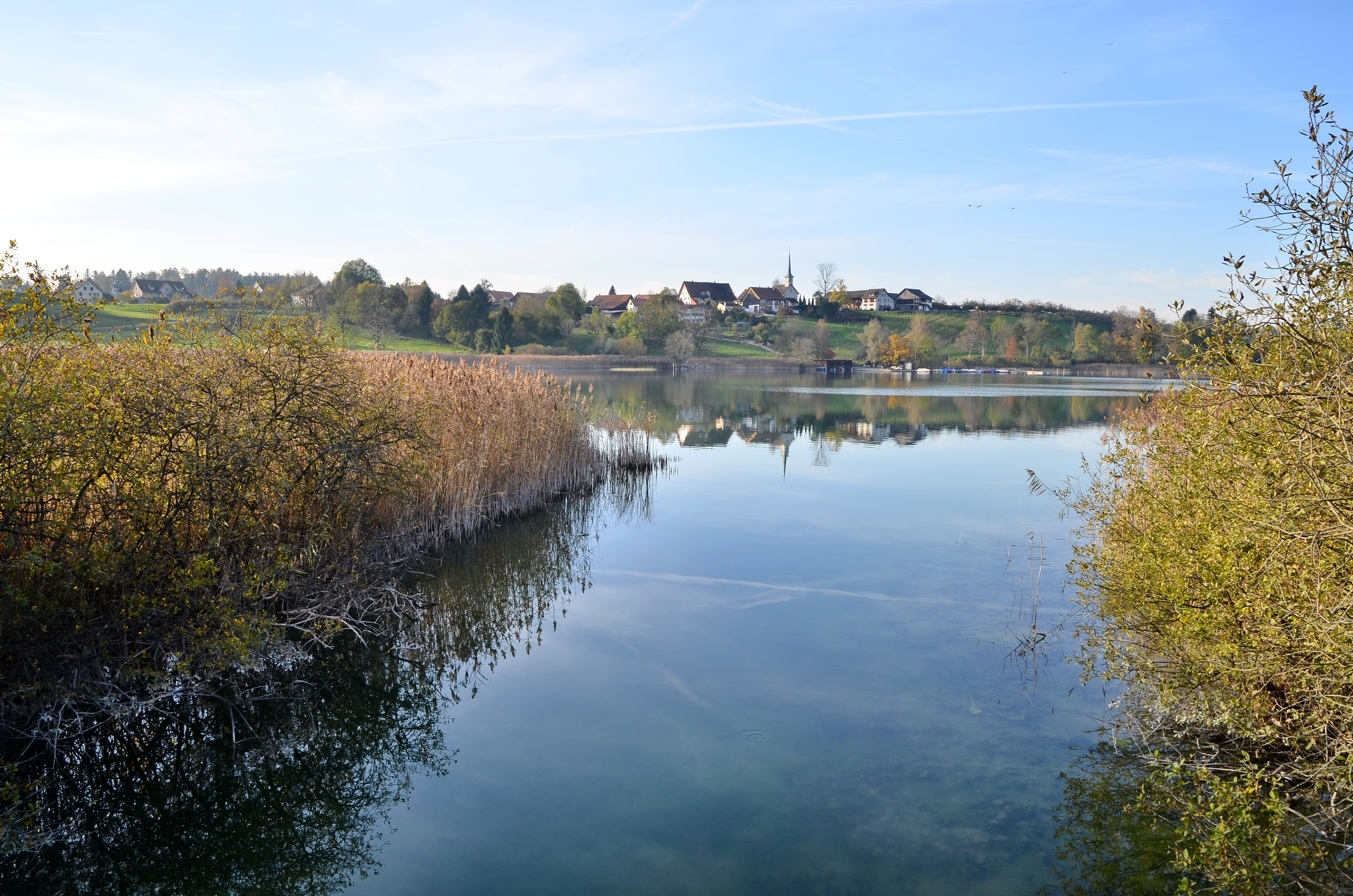
Aabach stream

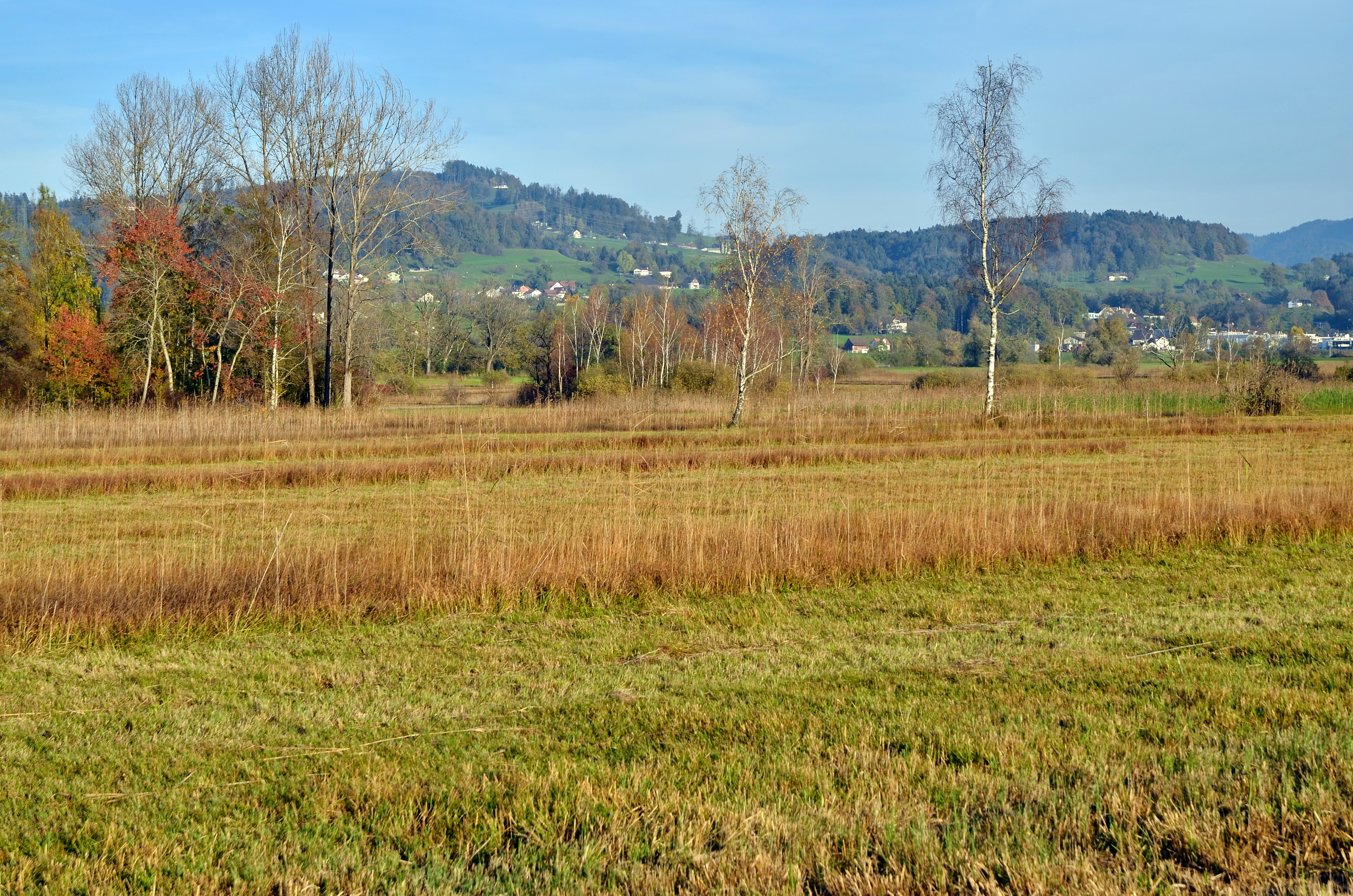

== Geography ==
Robenhausen is located in the Hinwil District in the Zürcher Oberland at the southeastern lake shore of Pfäffikersee. Robenhauser Ried (Swiss German: Robenhusener Riet) is a protected reed landscape. The Aabach stream drains the Robenhauser Ried wetlands and the lake, and it flows into the Ustermer Aa.

== Transportation ==
The bus line operator Verkehrsbetriebe Zürichsee und Oberland (VZO) provides the local bus transport in Wetzikon for the regions of the Oberland and the upper northeastern shore of Lake Zurich.

== Robenhauser Ried ==
The Pfäffikersee reed and marsh belt at Robenhausen has a width of about 1 kilometre (1 mi). From the beginning of the 18th century until about 1950 there peat was cut. The wetland is a nature reserve of national importance and is situated between Seegräben, Kempten and Irgenhausen covering an area of about 2 square kilometres (1 mi^{2}). In 1873 a shooting range was established in Robenhausen; the building has been used as a boathouse for decades, but the contaminants in the soil exceeded the limit values and a "significant risk" for groundwater, thus in July 2013 a 300 metres (984 ft) and 400 metres (1,312 ft) area had to be decontaminated with a cost totaling to about 255,000 Swiss Francs.

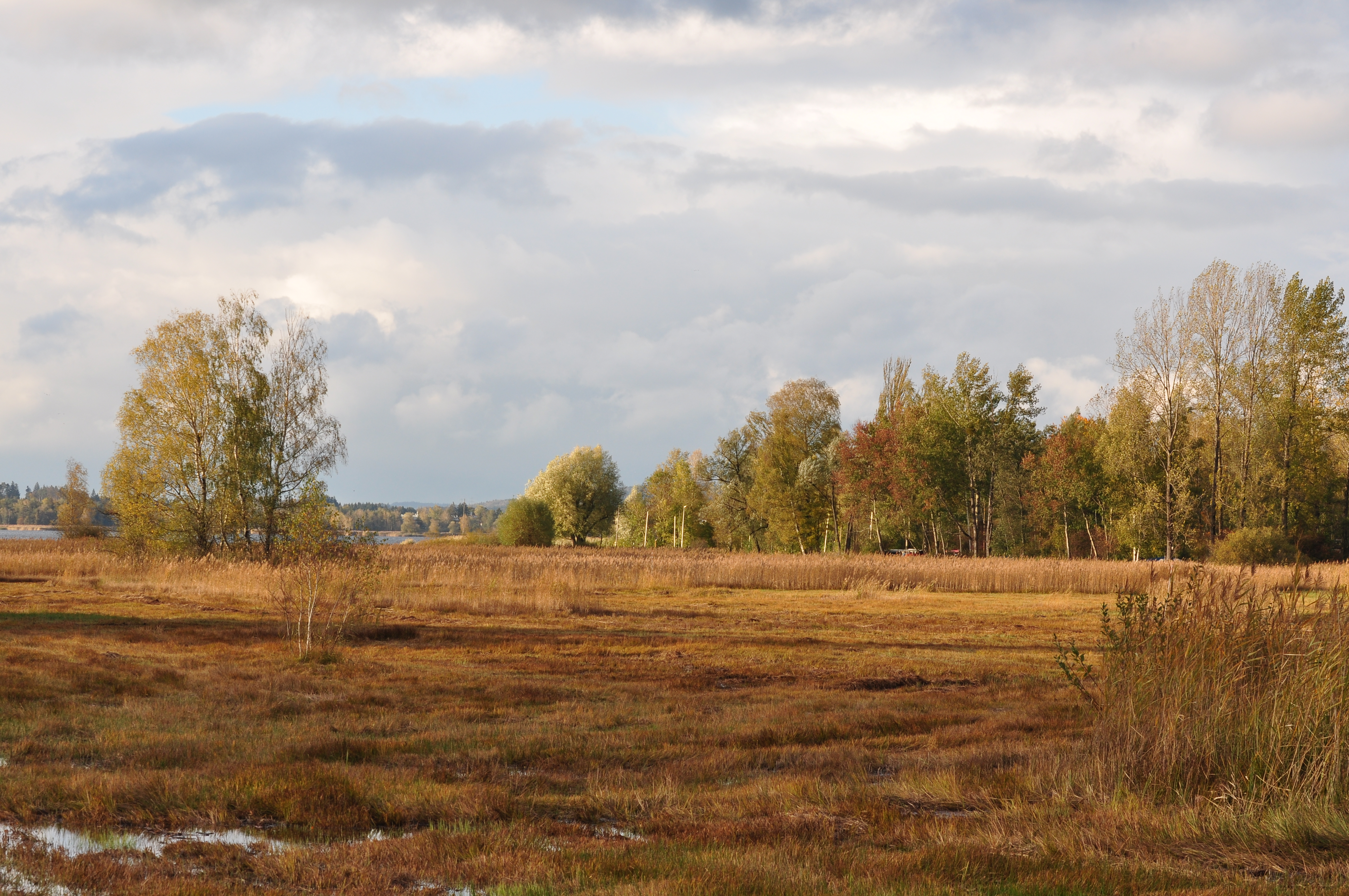
Robenhauser Ried

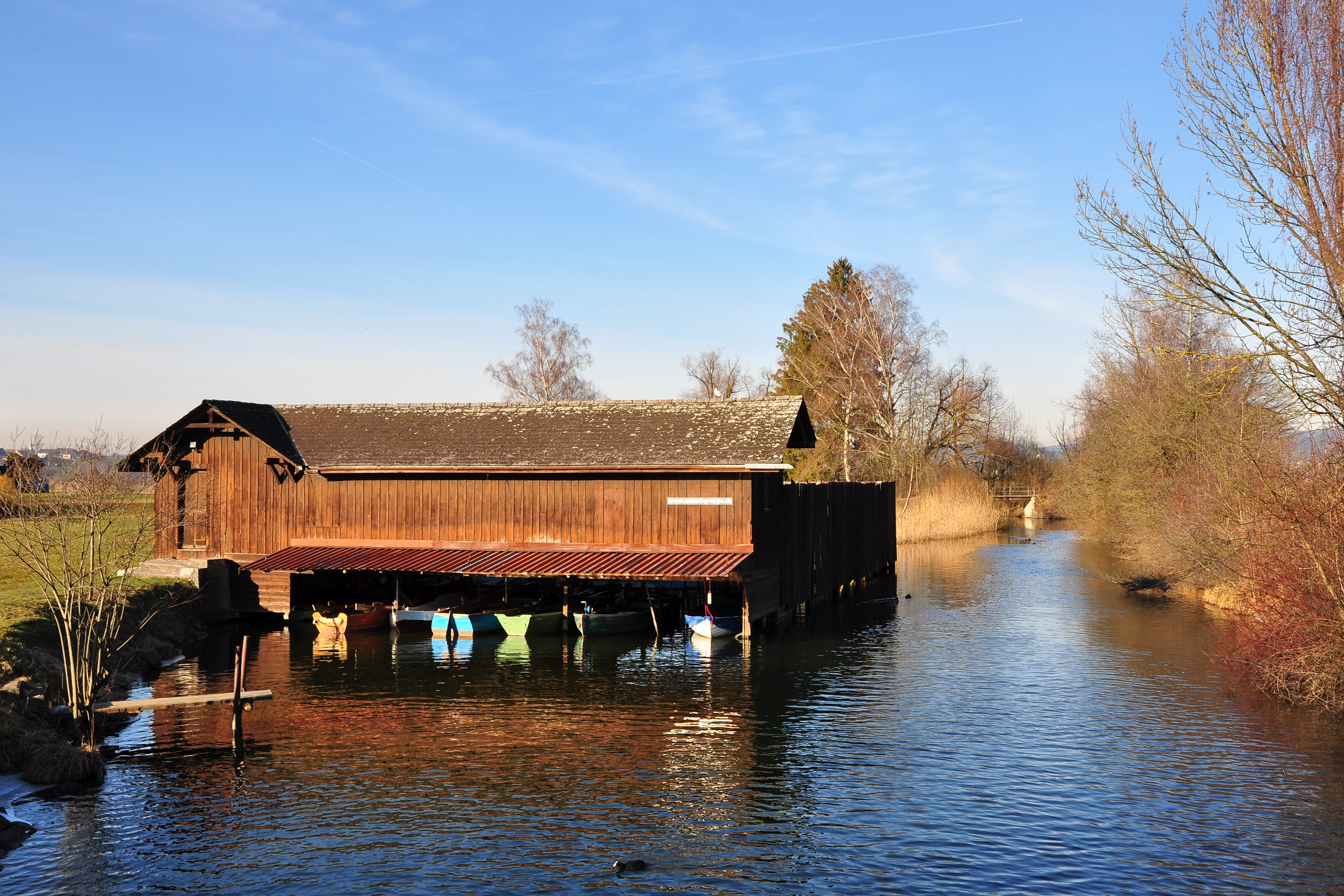
former shooting range used as a boathouse

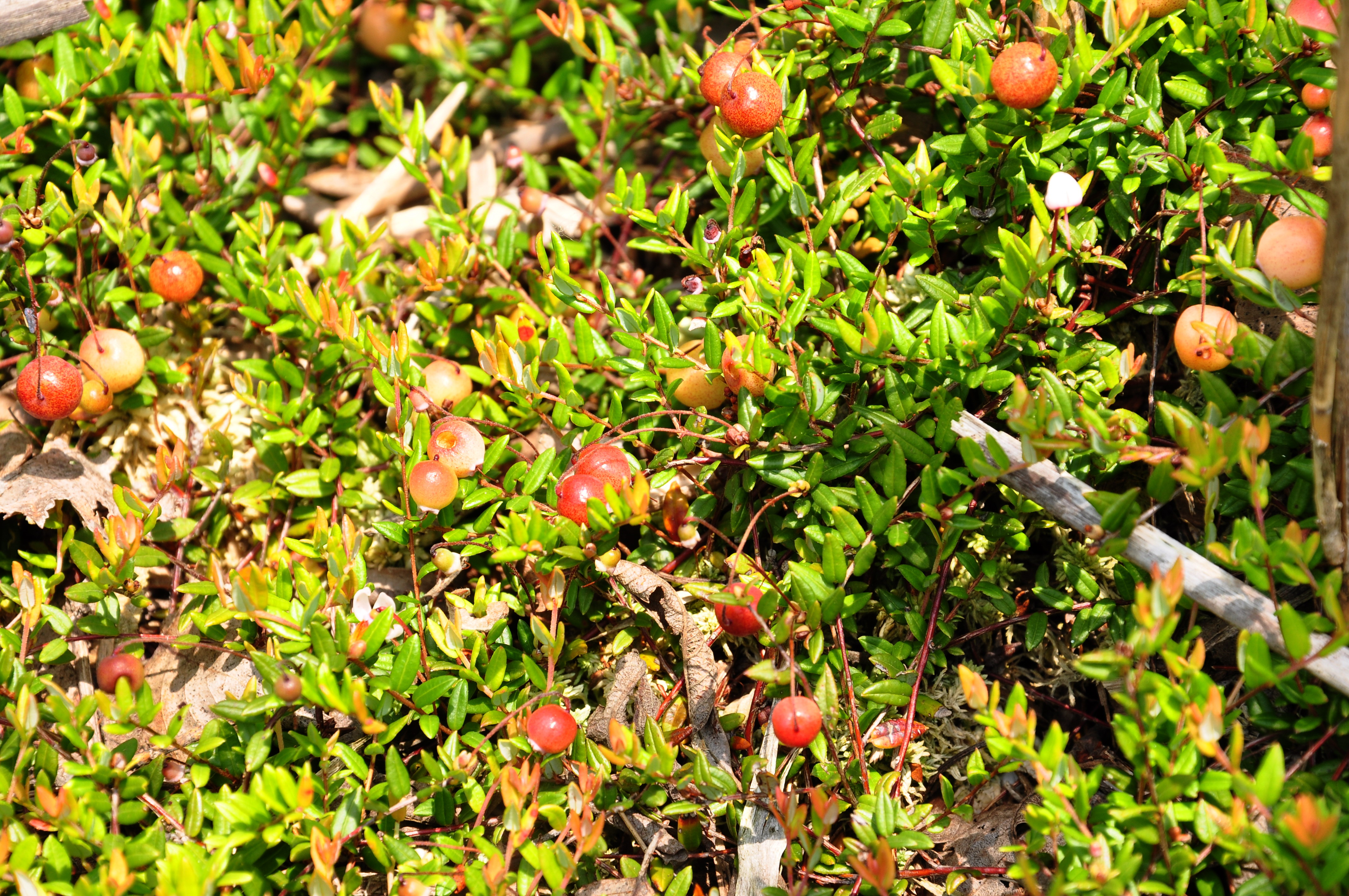
flora among them Vaccinium oxycoccos ...

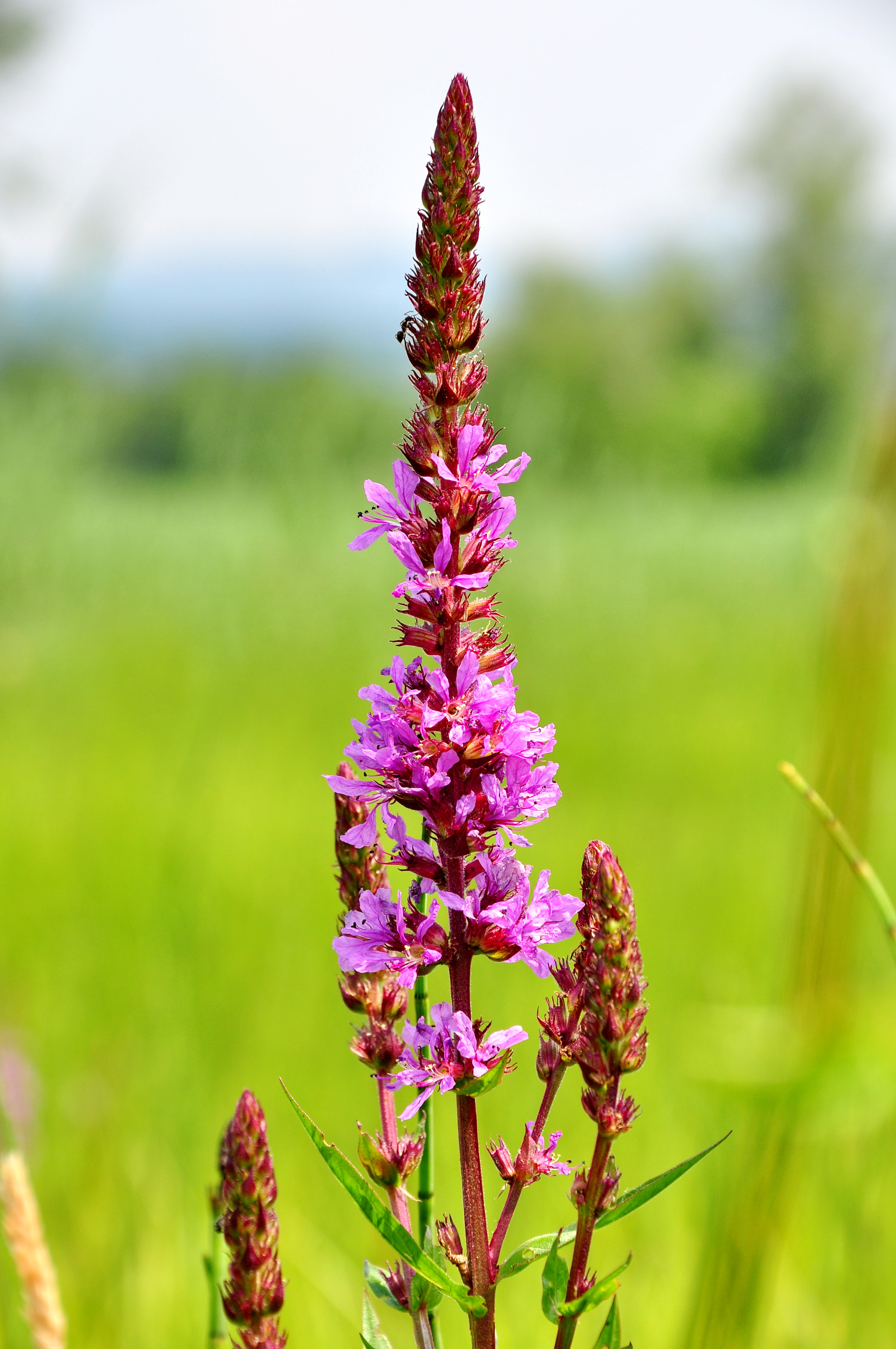
... and Lythrum salicaria

== UNESCO World Heritage Site ==
The area at the southern end of the Pfäffikersee lake shore has been inhabited for over 10,000 years. Neolithic hunters and collectors built during the European Mesolithic at various locations storage bins, and in the Neolithic period several small, permanently inhabited settlements near the shore.

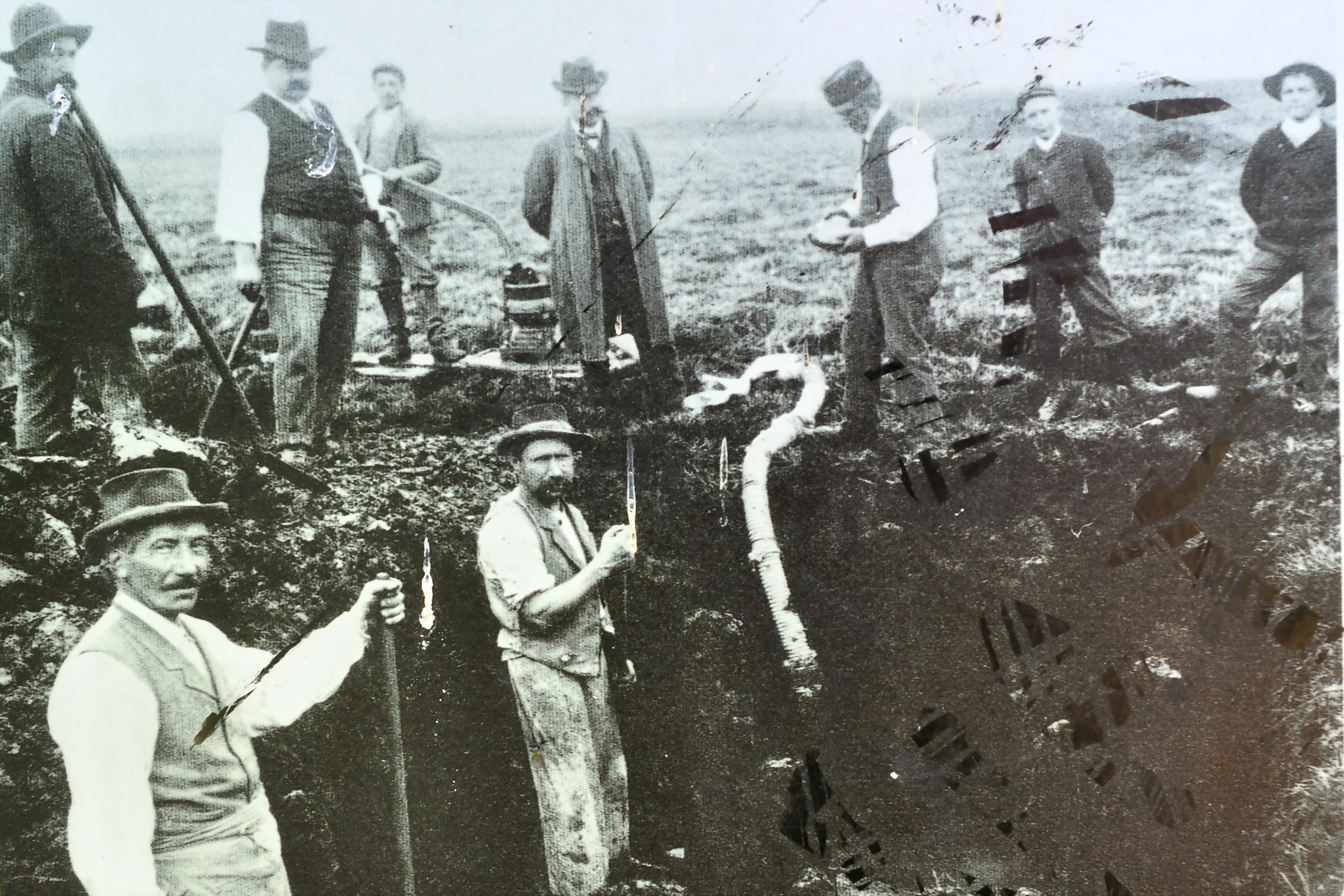
Jakob Messikommer's excavations around 1900

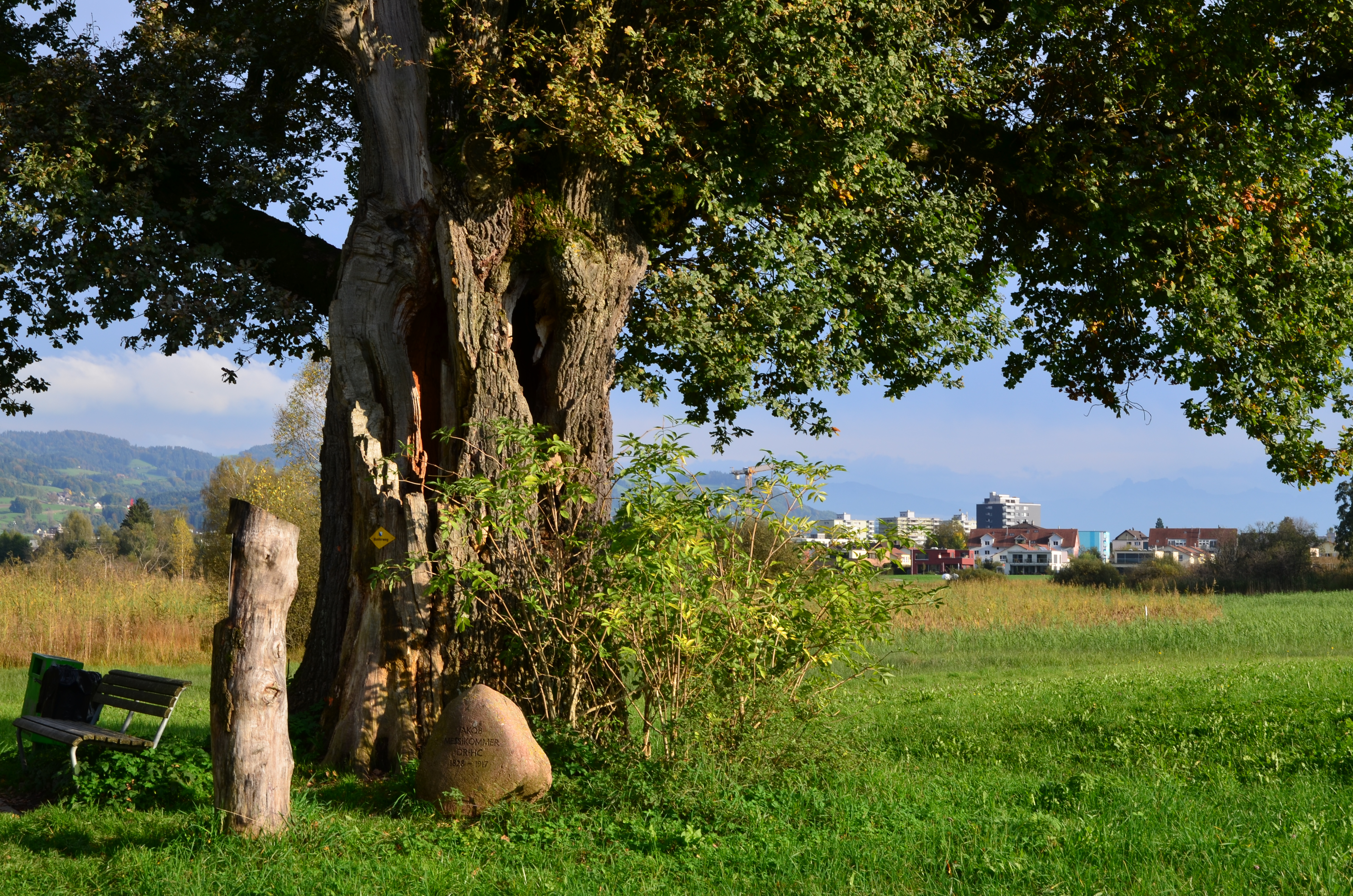
Messikommer Eich

The remains of the Neolithic settlements in the protected marsh area were discovered by Jakob Messikommer between 1856 and 1858. On occasion of several excavations to the 1900s, Messikommer reported the discovery of numerous individual finds, and first, he also interpreted two different layers a settlement that was rebuilt, and in fact he was right. Jakob Messikommer's achievements were honored with a memorial stone and the so-called Messikomer Eich, an oak in the Robenhausen reed.

The prehistoric settlement is part of the UNESCO World Heritage Site Prehistoric Pile dwellings around the Alps, being one of 111 locations with the greatest scientific potential. In the Swiss inventory of cultural property of national significance Robenhausen is listed as Class A object.

== See also ==
- Prehistoric pile dwellings around Zürichsee

== Literature ==
- Peter J. Suter, Helmut Schlichtherle et al.: Pfahlbauten – Palafittes – Palafitte. Palafittes, Biel 2009. ISBN 978-3-906140-84-1.
- Pfahlbaufieber. Von Antiquaren, Pfahlbaufischern, Altertümerhändlern und Pfahlbaumythen. Mitteilungen der Antiquarischen Gesellschaft in Zürich, volume 71. Chronos, Zürich 2004. ISBN 978-3-0340-0672-9
