= Wetzikon-Robenhausen =

Prehistoric pile dwelling on Pfäffikersee lakeshore in Robenhausen, Switzerland

Robenhausen
UNESCO World Heritage Site
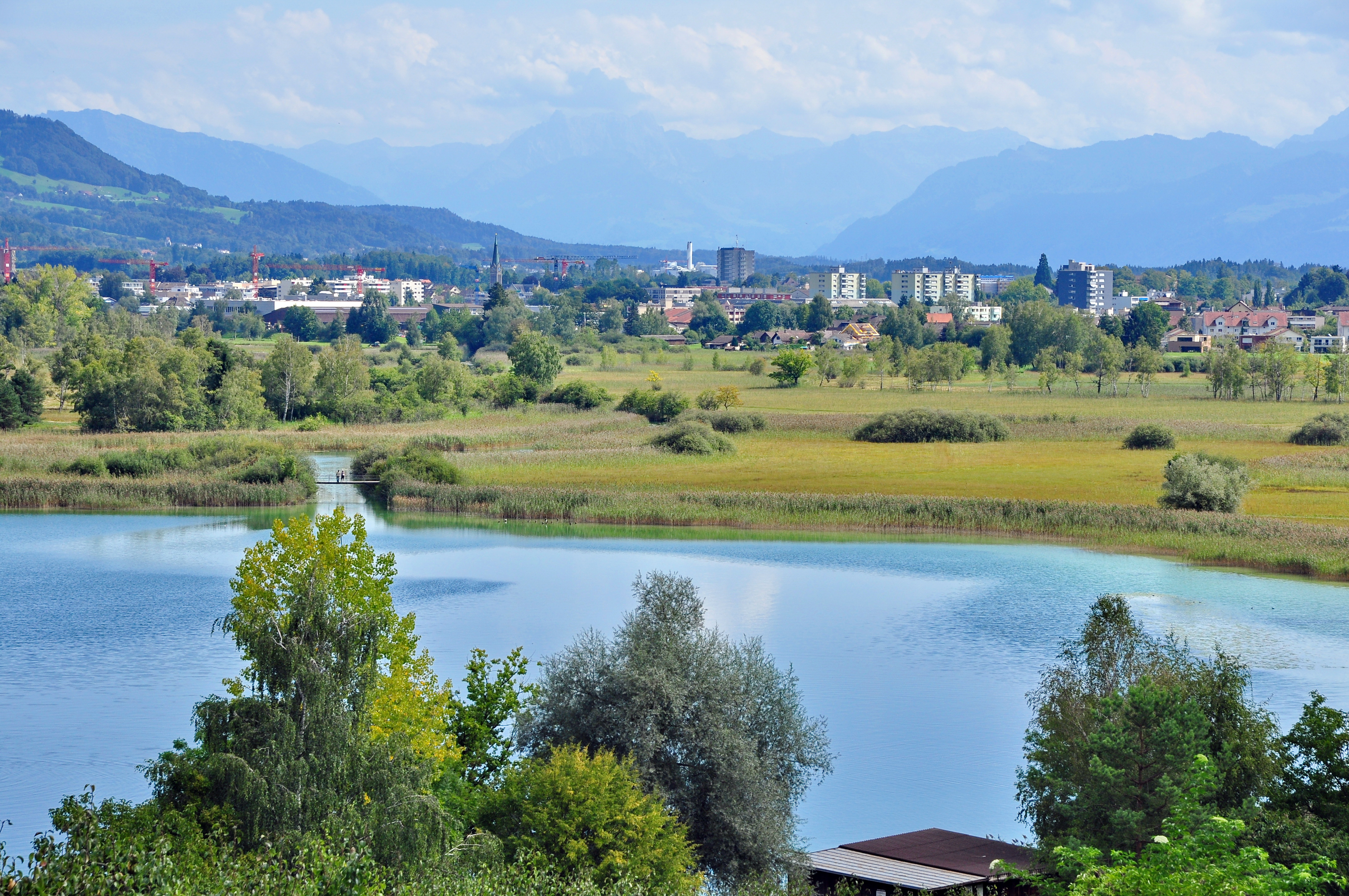
- The Robenhauser Ried, named after the locality of Robenhausen, as seen from Jucker Farm at Seegräben; Wetzikon in the background; Wetzikon's locality of Kempten to the left.

- Location within Canton of Zürich Location within Switzerland
- Location: Robenhausen, Wetzikon, Hinwil District, Canton of Zürich, Switzerland
- Part of: Prehistoric Pile Dwellings around the Alps
- Criteria: Cultural: (iv), (v)
- Reference: 1363-054
- Inscription: 2011 (35th Session)
- Area: 0.92 ha (2.3 acres)
- Buffer zone: 155 ha (380 acres)
- Website: www.palafittes.org/en/index.html
- Coordinates: 47°20′9.06″N 8°47′8.17″E

Wetzikon–Robenhausen is one of the 111 serial sites of the UNESCO World Heritage Site Prehistoric pile dwellings around the Alps, of which are 56 located in Switzerland. The site is located on Pfäffikersee lakeshore in Robenhausen, a locality of the municipality of Wetzikon in the Canton of Zürich in Switzerland.

== Geography ==
The site is located on Pfäffikersee lake shore in Robenhausen, a locality of the municipality of Wetzikon in the Canton of Zürich in Switzerland. The settlement comprises around 10 hectares (24.71 acres), and the buffer zone including the lake area comprises around 20 hectares (49.42 acres) in all.

== Description ==
The area at the southern end of the Pfäffikersee lake shore has been inhabited for over 10,000 years. Neolithic hunters and collectors built during the European Mesolithic at various locations storage bins, and in the Neolithic period several small, permanently inhabited settlements near the shore.

Wetzikon–Robenhausen is situated in the Robenhausen wetland between Seegräben and Kempten covering an area of about 2 square kilometres (1 mi^{2}). The settlement site is characterized by the excellent preservation of organic remains and evidence of textile production, including textiles and parts of a Neolithic loom. A rare find is a board which was probably a door, attributed to the Pfyn culture. The age of a dugout found in 1943 is not yet released. Back to the middle-European Bronze Age era date numerous individual finds, among them two trailers. Further excavations at Tösstalstrasse provided evidence of a settlement of the Glockenbecher culture. Except for individual finds and Jakob Messikommer's excavations to the 1900s, the vast protected area is not yet explored in its entire extent.

== Archaeological excavations ==
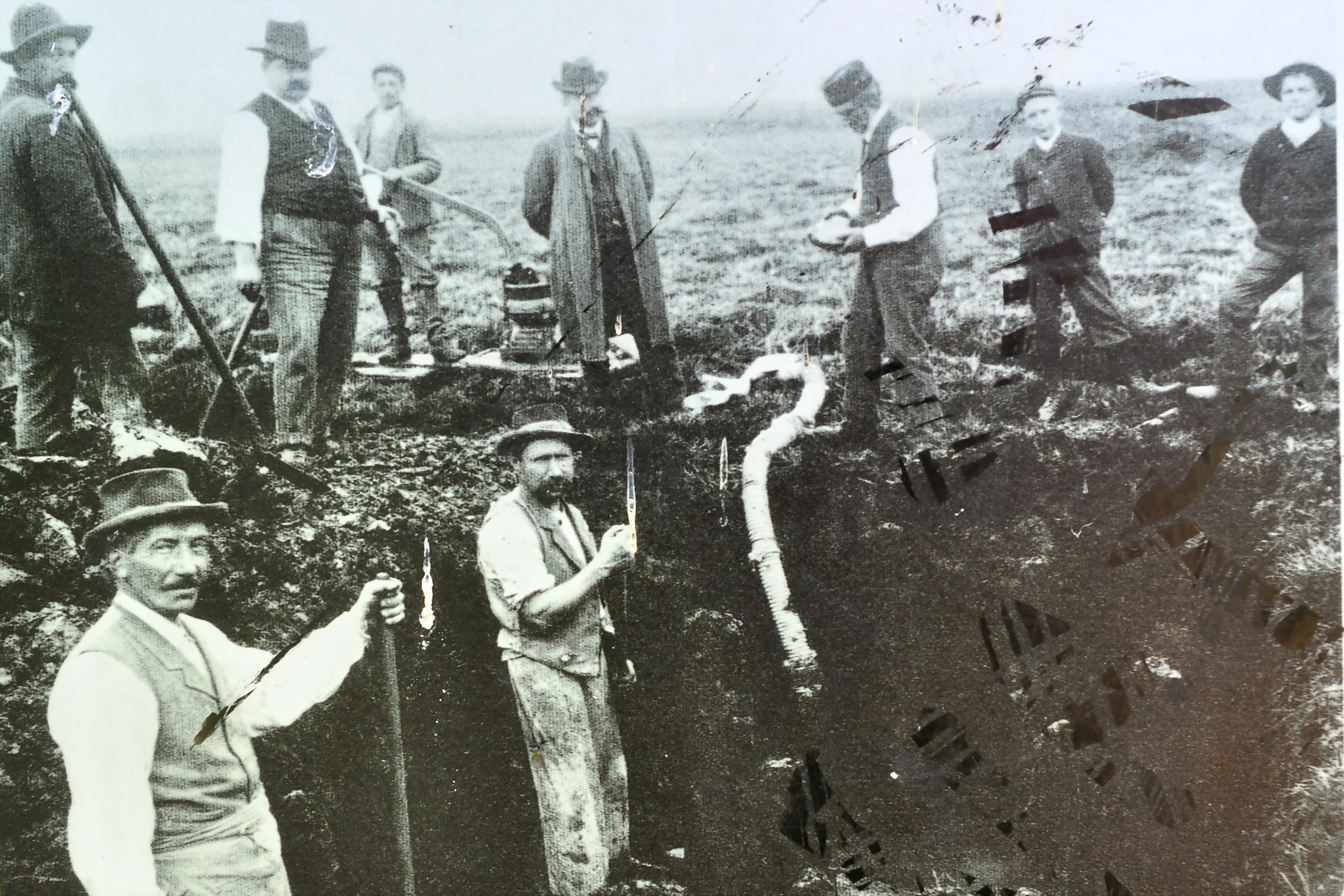
Jakob Messikommer's excavations around 1900

The remains of the Neolithic settlements in the protected marsh area were discovered by Jakob Messikommer between 1856 and 1858. On occasion of several excavations Messikommer reported the discovery of a dugout of a peculiar form and other artefacts of the equipment of a hunter; he also distinguished two of a peat layer separate segmented layers which Messikommer interpreted as a settlement that was rebuilt, and in fact he was right. Additional individual finds included longbows, hatchets made of stone and stag horn, and ceramics. Messikommer identified, among the organic finds, however 58 different animal species. In another of his excavations Messikommer revealed the remains of woven fabrics, braids and seeds and evidence of the production of butter. Carved wooden knife, a trowel and scoops, a yoke of hazel, flail, remains of a garment and one from raffia braided mat were other single finds. Jakob Messikommer's achievements were honored with a memorial stone and the so-called Messikomer Eich, an oak in the Robenhausen reed.

== Protection ==
As well as being part of the 56 Swiss sites of the UNESCO World Heritage Site Prehistoric pile dwellings around the Alps, the settlement is also listed in the Swiss inventory of cultural property of national and regional significance as a Class A object of national importance. Hence, the area is provided as a historical site under federal protection, within the meaning of the Swiss Federal Act on the nature and cultural heritage (German: Bundesgesetz über den Natur- und Heimatschutz NHG) of 1 July 1966. Unauthorised researching and purposeful gathering of findings represent a criminal offense according to Art. 24.

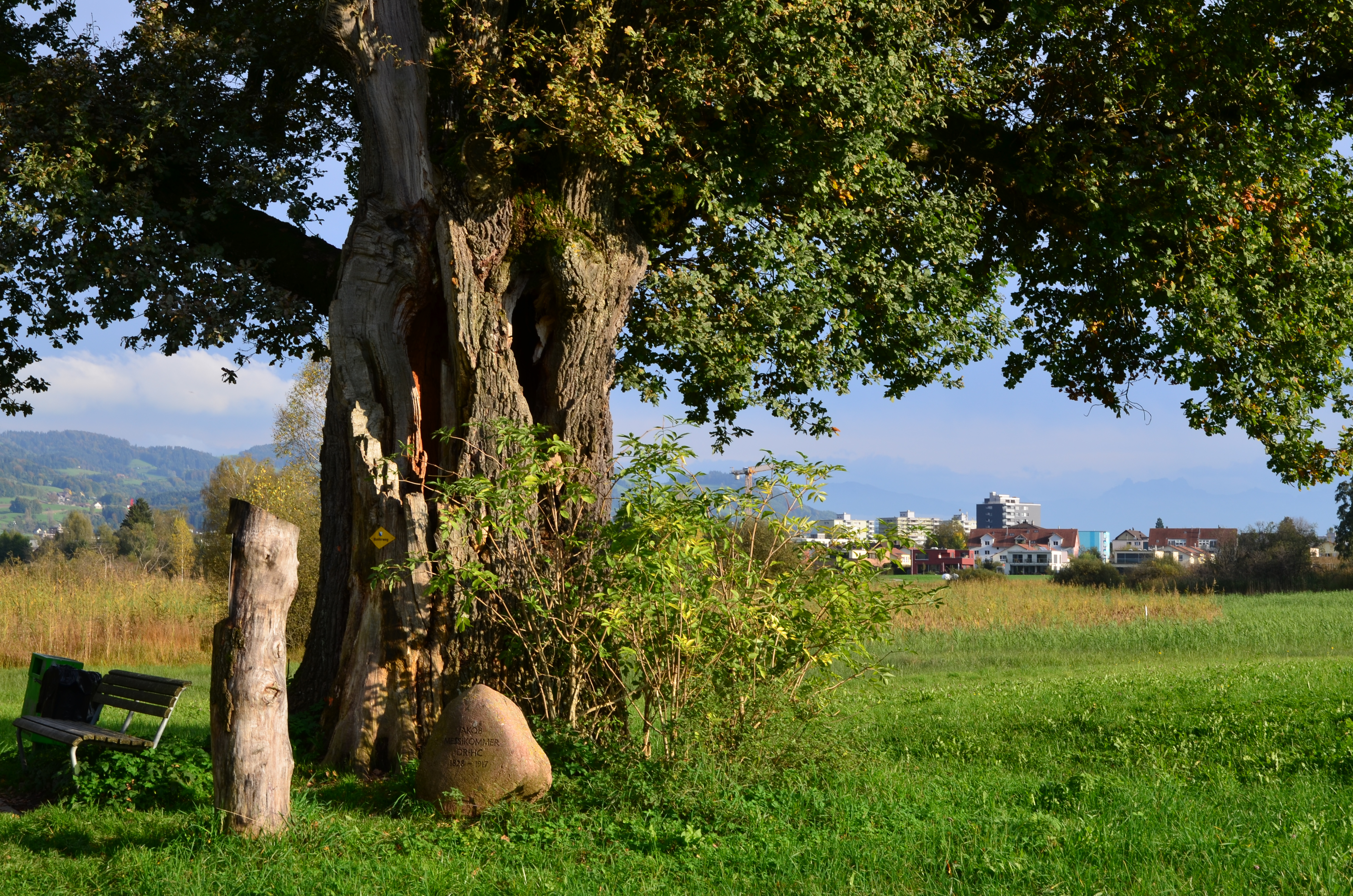
Messikommer Eich

== Site architecture ==
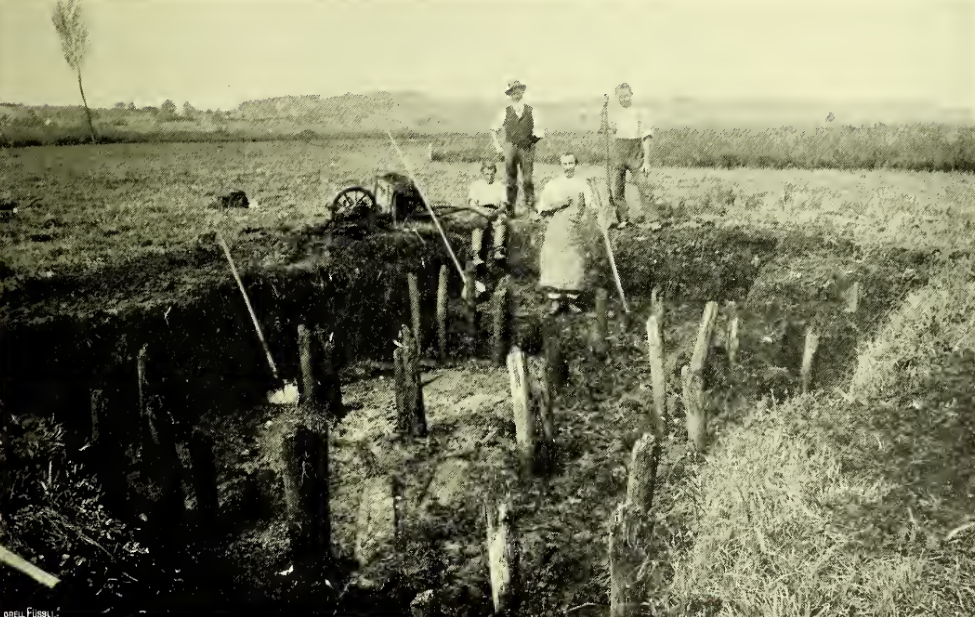
Image of piles when first excavated

The settlement at Robenhausen consisted of rectangular huts, typically measuring about 6 – 7 meters in length with a base area of approximately 40 square meters. Excavations revealed an evolution in building materials: the first and second settlement layers used exclusively softwoods, while the third and final branch utilized split oak wood for floors and stakes.

=== Pile fastening and foundation ===
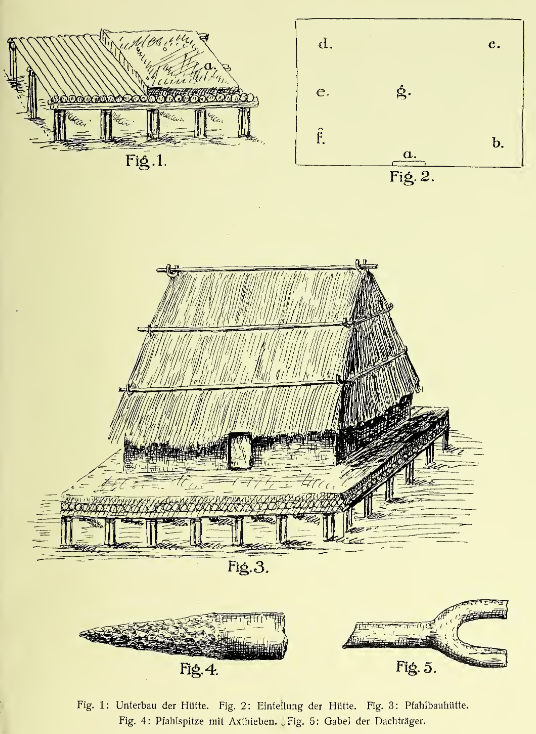
Drawing of a house and its foundation. Fig 2: a) marking of door b) Location of loom c) Storage room of food d) The goat shed e) The hearth f) Location of loom g) Living space Fig 4: Pile tip with axe marks. Fig 5: Fork of the roof trusses.

The best preserved remnants of the Robenhausen settlement housing were the piles used to keep the houses elevated from the ground. The logs making up the piles measure from 12 to 18 cm in diameter, having been cut with stone axes. The cut was made clean by the burning of logs, chopping away the chard wood, and repeating. After the logs fell they were then sharpened into 30 cm long point while keeping the bark attached to the upper part of the log. Once these stakes were driven into the lake bed mud, they became almost impossible to pull out because the mud created an airtight seal around the wood.

Longer gable supports were integrated into the pile grid to provide the necessary height for the huts. The walls were then built upon this out of round timber (approximately 4–5 cm thick) with a mixture of clay (2–3 cm thick) interspersed with vegetable grains, grass, and straw in a effort to reinforce and insulate the rooms. Gaps were left in the walls, kept as small as possible to preserve heat, used to act as windows, allowing natural light into the building and for smoke to escape.

The foundation of the huts were laid flat with floors. By the area surrounding the hearth, to protect the floor, residents applied a thick layer of clay with sandstone slaps laid flat as a precautionary measure against fire. In the living area a thick layer of moss, beech leaves, and straw acted as padding for sleeping and general comfort away from the work area.

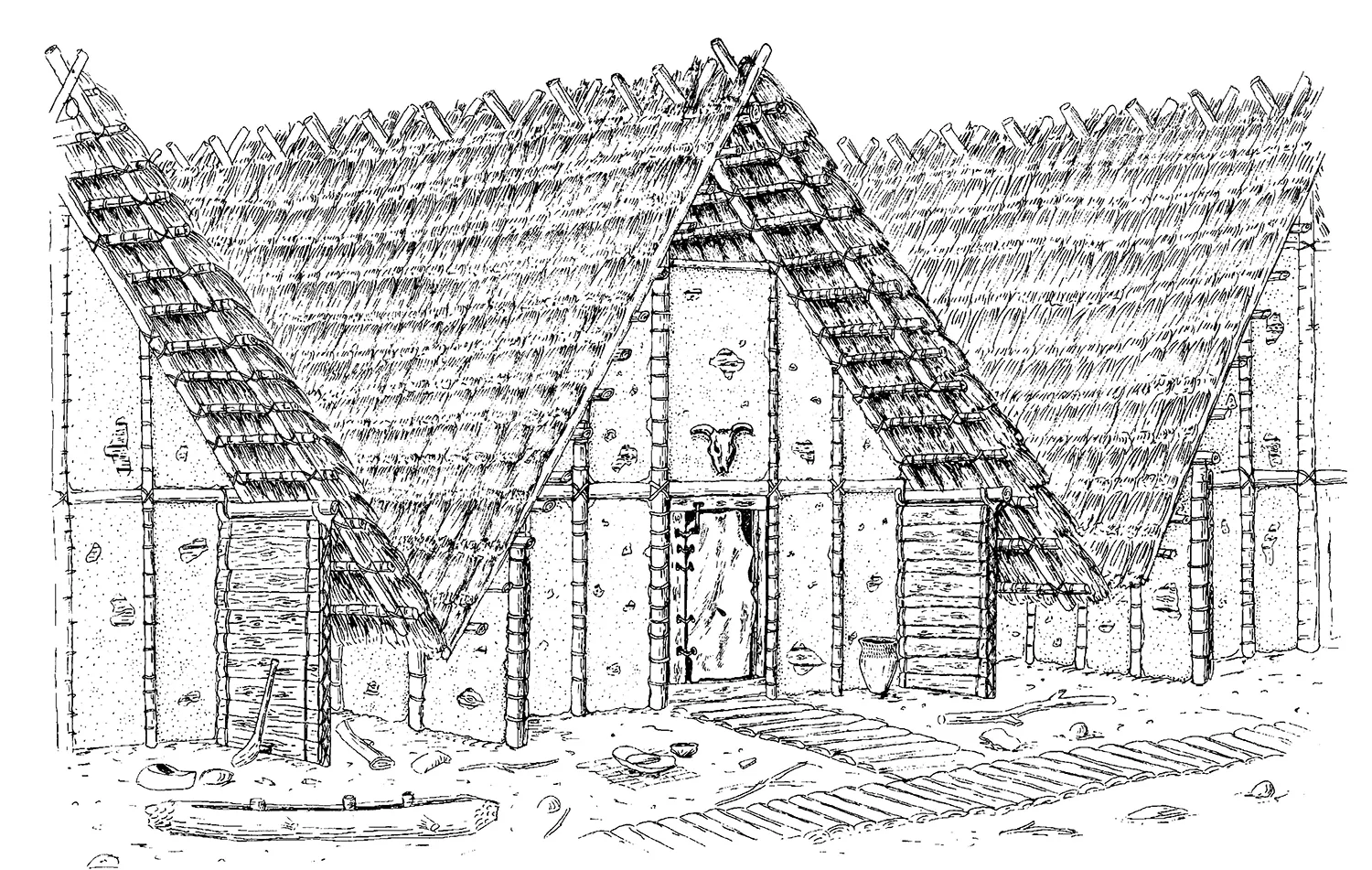
Artists reconstruction of housing

The houses were constructed close to one another, most likely with the roofs touching or connecting. While this did increase the risk of fire spread it also provided mutual protection during periods of cold, strong wings, or snowstorms. Each hut was equipped with its own loom, supplies, and mill, indicating a lack of specialty houses or distinctions among buildings.

=== Settlement cycles ===
Analysis of the pile foundations indicate that the settlement was completely destroyed by fire at least twice during its long period of existence. These fires most likely spread across the entire settlement area and destroyed the superstructure, and harming the driven piles, of every hut. Dating methods reveal that after the first fire, the village was rebuilt, only to be destroyed by a second fire later. A third, smaller settlement was eventually established on the ruins of the previous two, lasting until the beginning of the Bronze Age.

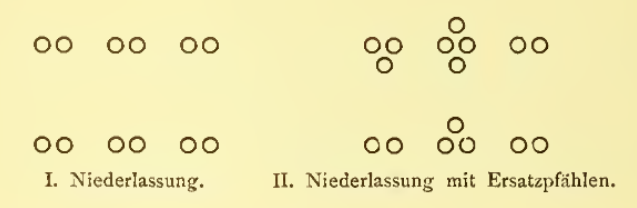
Drawing describing the Robenhausen pile groupings before and after the fires.

Clear evidence of this is found in the presence of "replacement piles" directly adjacent to burned ones. Because the fire did not always damage the underground foundation with the same intensity everywhere, parts of the old foundation could sometimes be reused. In the case that this wasn't possible new piles were driven into the lake bed directly next to the old, charred remains, as shown in the image to the right. These new piles were often driven outside the original lines of the previous hut, slightly shifting the footprint of the reconstructed dwellings.

==== Why the Site was Eventually Abandoned ====
While the residents maintained general upkeep and rebuilt several times after fires, the settlement was eventually abandoned permanently around the beginning of the Bronze Age. Researchers suggest two main reasons:

1. Peat Formation: Ongoing peat growth made living on the lake increasingly difficult, turning the area into a swamp that was hard to navigate for both residents and visitors.
2. Cultural Shift: The appearance of metal (bronze) may have triggered a change in lifestyle, prompting the population to settle on solid ground rather than continuing the tradition of stilt-house living

== Items made of stone, bone, and horn ==
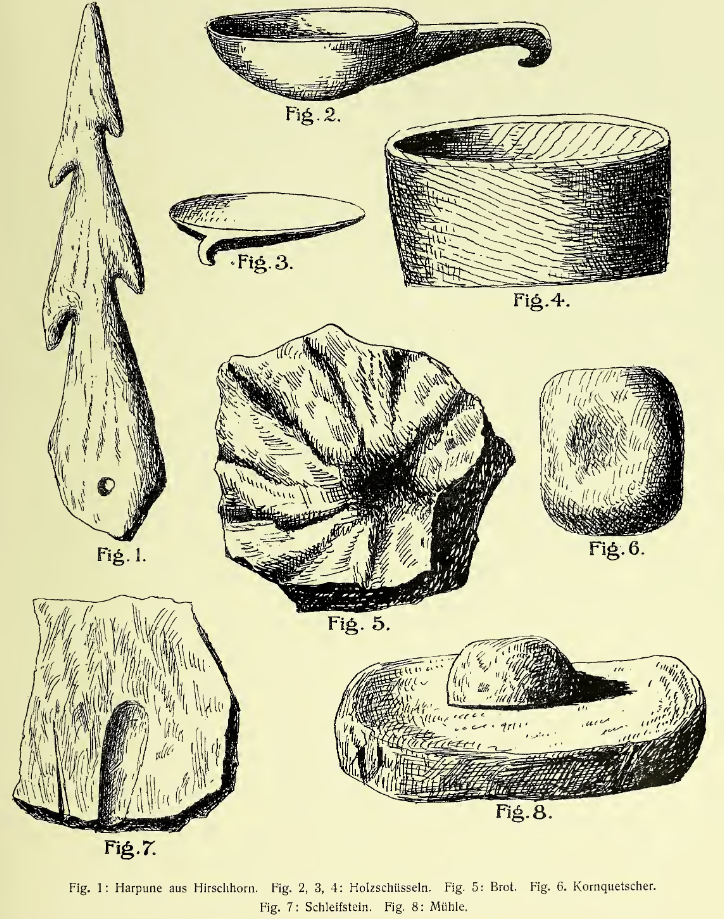
Fig. 1: Harpoon made of stag horn. Figs. 2, 3, 4: Wooden bowls. Fig. 5: Bread. Fig. 6: Grain crusher. Fig. 7: Grindstone. Fig. 8: Mill.

Only a few rock types from other regions were found, such as Saussurite Gabbro from western Switzerland and Nephrite, which appear only in the third settlement. Stone axes were produced differently from surrounding areas as it seems that residents of Robenhausen focused on stone quality rather than shape, taking durable stones back to the settlement and shaping them with flint tools into their desired form. The axes were crafted with an artistic taste, a narrow and flat side hammered into place with a groove fitted in the stone, it is unlikely that these were tools for everyday use as they were found in pristine condition.

Tools made of horn were used for hoes, cups, and various cutting tools. With few exceptions, stag horn was primarily used, antlers were found at the site but they did not appear to be refined into tools. Tusks and bones were refined into knives and other tools, for example a harpoon made of deer antler. Bone tools generally appear to have been made with more careful workmanship and with even less volume, not being knapped as the stone tools were but instead carefully cut and carved.

Other weapons, such as spear and arrow heads, were made almost exclusively from flint, the material most valued for producing sharp and durable edges. Flint was also widely used for tools that required cutting ability, including saws and small knives. The bows themselves were carefully carved from yew wood; several longbows made from yew have been found preserved. Hunters likely carried their bows regularly, often accompanied by arrows tipped with flint points; arrowheads made from other materials, such as bone, rock crystal, or nephrite, appear only rarely and were exceptional rather than common.

In addition to the bow and arrows, hunters also relied on other tools. A flint-tipped lance mounted on a long wooden shaft may have been carried as a secondary weapon, useful when prey was encountered at closer range as neither the bow nor the axe alone was sufficient in all situations. Slingstones—small, rounded pebbles typically about 6–8 mm thick—have also been discovered and were probably used with simple slings for hunting small game. These stones were likely gathered from the glacial gravels of nearby streams. The slings themselves were probably made from leather or fur, materials that can not be proved as they rarely survive in the archaeological record. Adhesive substances such as natural pitch or asphalt were also important as they were used to fasten saw blades, arrowheads, and axe heads securely into wooden shafts. Pitch could also serve as a kind of putty for repairing broken pottery handles and other equipment.

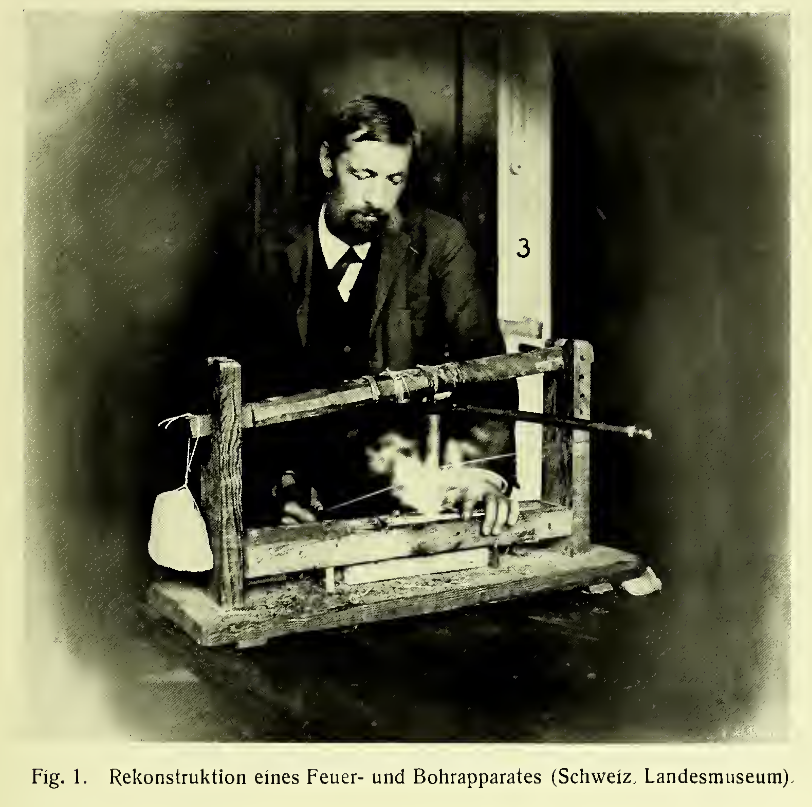
Fig 1. Reconstruction of fire and drilling apparatus (Switzerland. National Museum)

A primitive drill press was also discovered at the site. The device consisted of a solid base, such as a board, on which two wooden posts about 40–50 cm in diameter were set vertically about 60–80 cm apart. A lever attached to the top of one post could slide up and down in a slot on the other, allowing pressure to be applied to the drill. On the base was a holding device made of two parallel bars between which the stone or object to be drilled was wedged securely, small cross pieces keeping the drill tube from slipping. The drill itself consisted of a spindle mounted in a rod that ended in a point resting in a small dimple beneath the weighted lever. The lever was pressed down with weight to provide constant downward force and increase friction during drilling. Rotation was produced using a bow whose cord was wrapped around the spindle; the bow was typically about the length of a man’s arm so that each stroke could rotate the drill four or five times. The drill bit was a hollow cylinder made of either wood, bone, or horn, and drilling required abrasive material such as siliceous river sand or crushed quartz sand, which had to be continuously supplied while drilling. Stones were usually roughly shaped by tapping with another stone before drilling, and the final form was achieved by grinding once the hole was completed. The high friction produced by this system also made it effective for starting fires, smoke could appear within about two minutes, and with dry, flammable material it could quickly produce embers.

== Fauna and animal husbandry ==
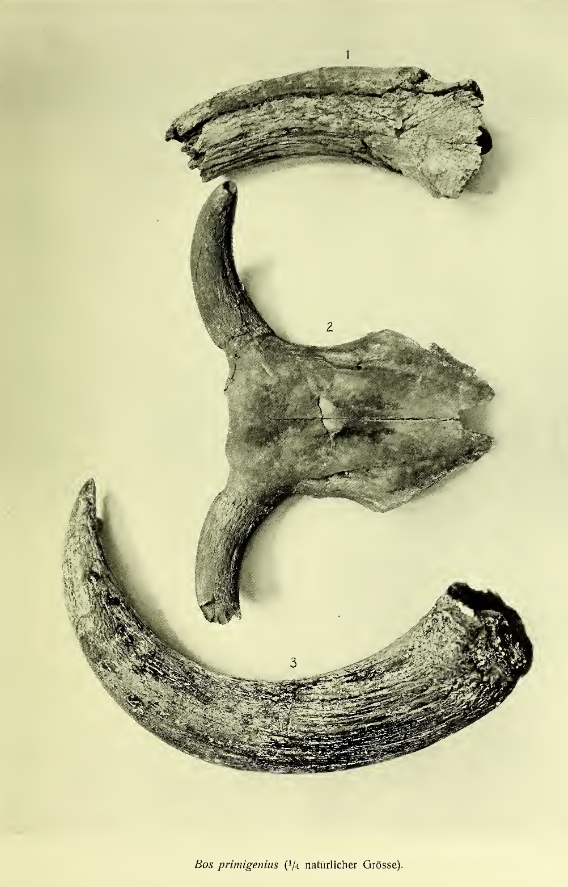
Fig. 1: Horn cone from Auroch (Bos primigenius). Current length of the horn cone: 33 cm. Fig. 2: large skull fragment with the horn cores, probably from a younger individual. Fig. 3: Horn core of the aurochs of extraordinary size.

Messikommer identified 58 different animal species at the site, reflecting the transition from hunting to domestic farming. The "peat dog" (Canis familiaris palustris) was a constant companion to the lake dwellers. Well-preserved skulls found throughout the site show a resemblance to the Caucasian jackal, suggesting these early dogs may have immigrated with human populations from the East. Other key domesticates included:

- Cattle (Bos taurus): Played the most vital role in the household. Finds include the small, short-horned "Peat Cattle" and the larger "Primigenius" breed.
- Sheep and Goats (Caprids): Goats were more prevalent in the early Stone Age layers, often referred to as the "poor man's cow."
- The Peat Pig (Sus scrofa domesticus): A domestic breed smaller than its wild counterpart, the wild boar.

The animals were kept in pens near the houses, likely integrated into the stilt structures themselves. These enclosures were lined with small branches, leaves, and straw, and were found riddled with thick layers of excrement. Research suggests a seasonal grazing pattern: during the warmer months, animals were likely moved in the early morning to fenced meadows along the lake shore and returned to the safety of the settlement at dusk.

Despite the rise of farming, hunting remained a necessity for food and materials. The red deer was the most significant wild resource, with lots of bones recovered and used as tools. The wild boar was a frequent target, reaching massive sizes according to recovered tusks. Rare remains of wolves, foxes, and wildcats were documented, fox meat appears to have been consumed during the Stone Age, as evidenced by flint knife marks on the bones.

The near-total lack of mouse remains suggests the stilt houses may have been relatively free of common household pests, possibly due to their isolated construction over the water. Another absence in the record is the hare. Despite being common in the surrounding forests, not a single bone has been found, suggesting some possible taboo against the animal.

Lake Pfäffikersee provided lots of fish, particularly pike, with some remains suggesting specimens weighed up to 20 kilos. Other bones identified include the European perch (Perca fluviatilis L.), the carp (Cyprinus carpio L.), the ide (Leuciscus idus), the chub (Squalius cephalus), the rudd (Scardinius erythrophthalmus Heckel), and the Atlantic salmon (Salmo salar L.). See tools section for information on fishing tools.

== Shifting Interpretations ==
=== Occupational Cultures ===
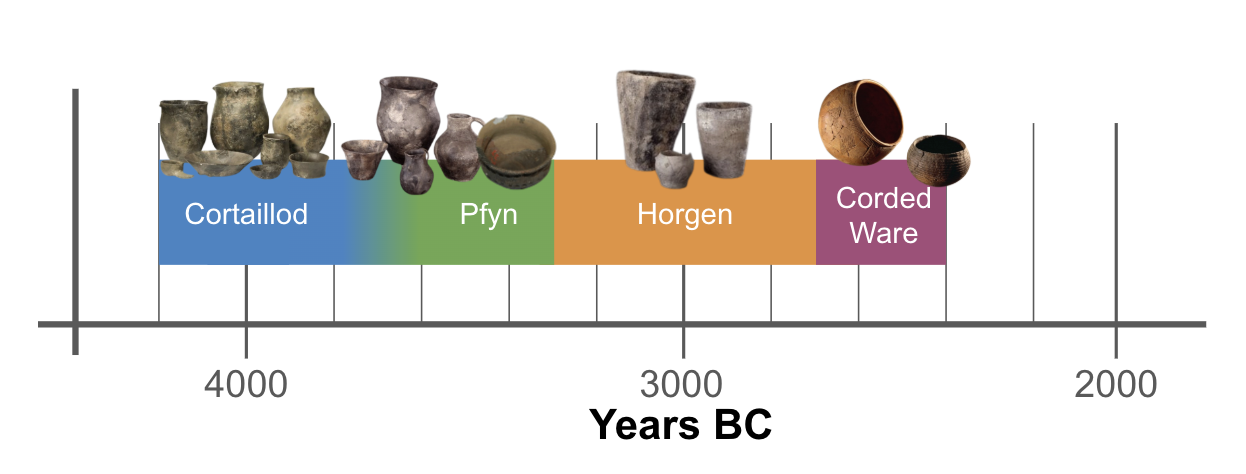
Relative timeline of Robenhausen cultural phases with images of diagnostic pottery for reference from museum exhibit images. Made by author ElectricButtercup using public information from the Milwaukee Public Museum.

Archaeologists have organized the lake's occupational timeline into four distinct cultures: the Cortaillod (4400-3700 BCE), the Pfyn (3700-3300 BCE), the Horgen (3300-2700 BCE), and the Schnurkeramik (or Corded Ware, 2700-2400 BCE) cultures. Most of the artifacts found at Wetzikon-Robenhausen can be attributed to the Pfyn culture—however, the line between early Pfyn and late Cortaillod cultures is so vague that some archaeologists consider the Pfyn alike to late Cortaillod. Differences between cultures can be determined by pottery (see "Artifacts").

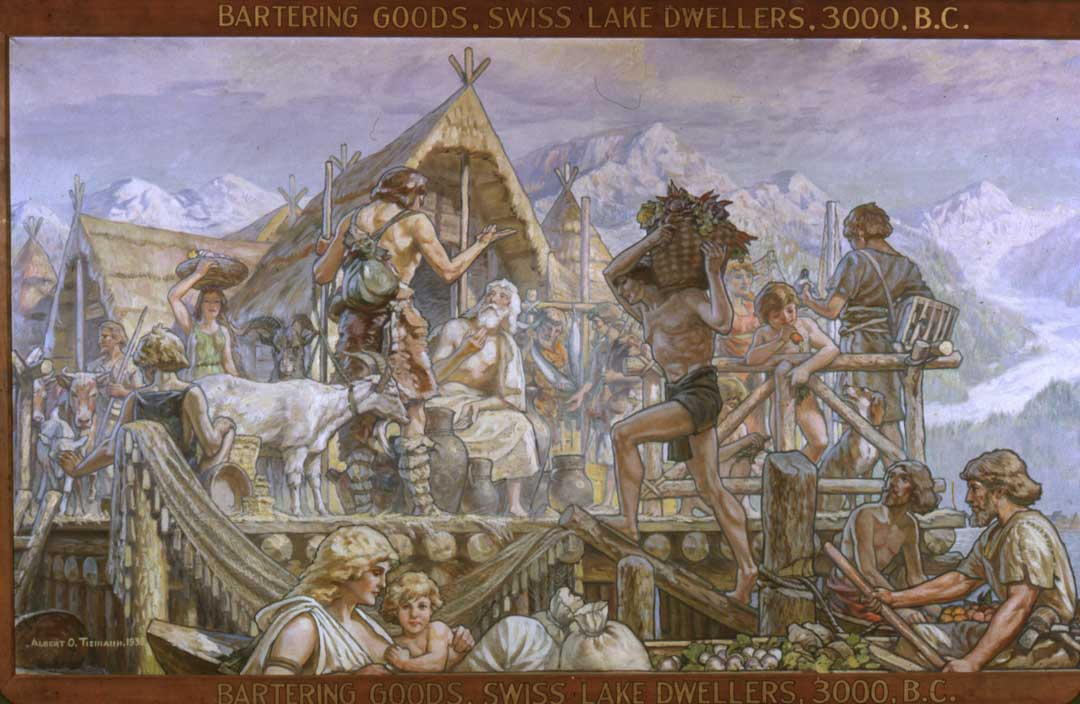
A painting of 1920s assumptions about what life at a Pfahlbauten might have looked like, based in part on Polynesian culture. Currently part of the Milwaukee Public Museum's private collection.

However, archaeologists did not always think this way. In Messikommer's initial 1850s record, he assumed all the artifacts in the area came from the same culture, from the weaving to the smithing, in one long occupational period. After Messikommer's era, the archaeological frenzy of the late 19th and early 20th century caused idealized depictions of stilt houses in artwork with little basis on the data available at the time. This particular painting took more inspiration from Polynesian culture than from the site itself.

=== The Pfahlbauproblem ===
Meanwhile, archaeologists were working through their hypotheses about where the stilt houses actually were; some argued all were built on dry banks, some argued all in shallow water, and some for above deep water. This was called the "Pfahlbauproblem," or the pile dwelling problem. Now, it is currently understood that pile dwellings occurred in several levels of water, from dry land all the way into stilted above deep water.

== Artifacts ==
The marshlands around Lake Zurich provide a unique set of preservational conditions for softer organic material, like flax cording, animal remains, and textiles. A small pool of these rare artifacts are housed at the British Museum through many small donations from private collectors and the Jakob Messikommer trust. The Smithsonian had a collection of artifacts from the sponsor Thomas Wilson in the 2010s. The rest of the artifacts can be found various museums in Switzerland and the Lake Dwelling Museum in Unteruhldingen, Germany.

=== Pottery ===
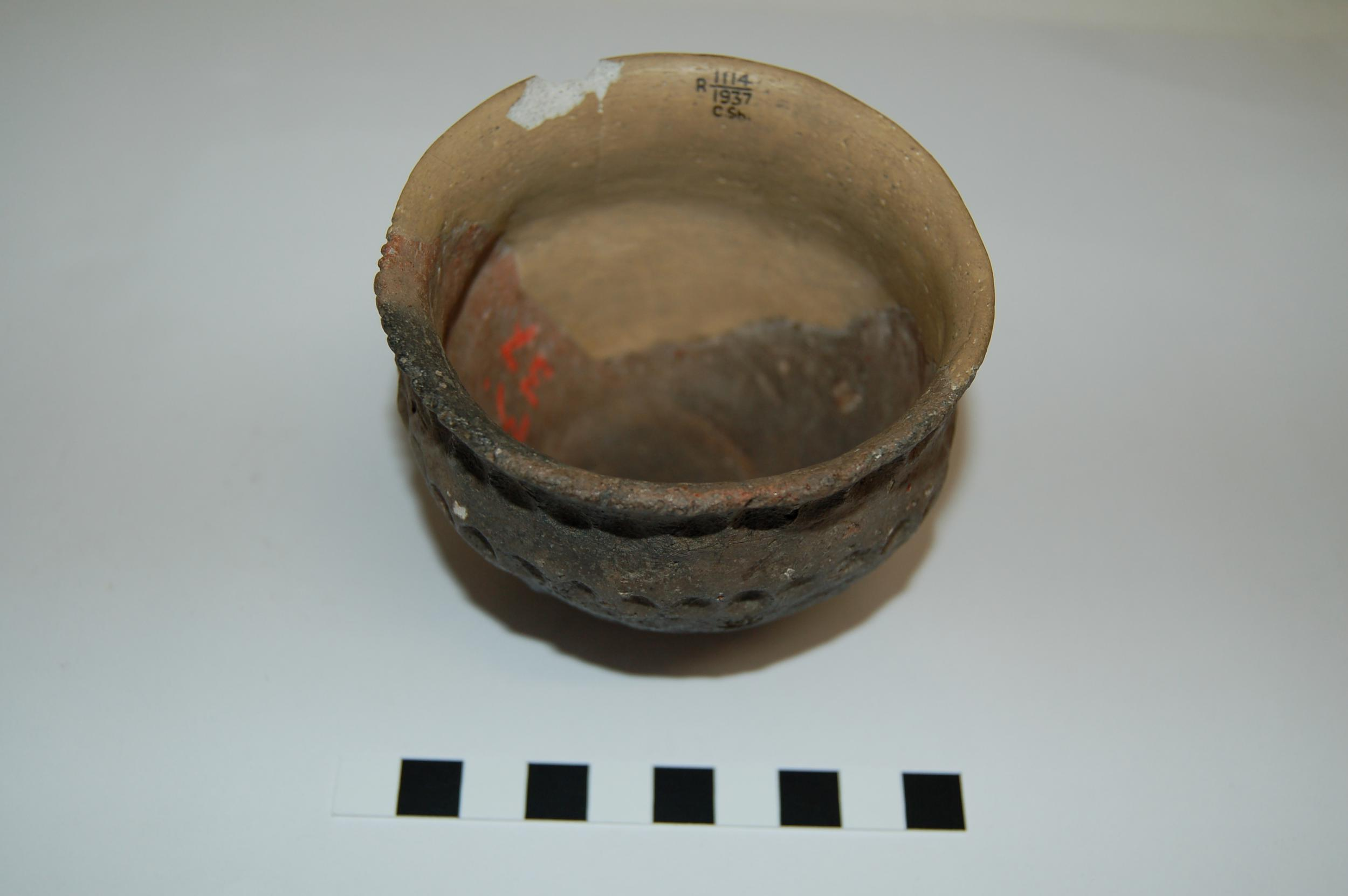
A piece of pottery found at Wetzikon-Robenhausen by Jakob Messikommer, later given to the British Museum in 1964. Courtesy of the British Museum.

Clay was commonly found at Wetzikon-Robenhausen with clay formed drainage holes and being used for chimneys around the houses. In the pottery workhouses the clay was based in course sand allowing it to be worked by hand much easier. Akin to flouring dough before kneading a similar process was employed to the preparation of clay, resulting in cups, bowls, and even spoons being formed. It is unclear if pottery was commonly fired or if the fired pottery discovered is a result of the mass fires that burned down the settlement multiple times. Inside some of these chard pots food remnants, pigments, and sand were found, all burned to almost unrecognizable degrees. As the dating of the vessels progress, jugs and larger clay containers are produced, accompanied with finer and finer grains of sand.

This pottery has generally been used as diagnostic artifacts, or artifacts with features that change reliably time period to time period. Throughout the occupational timeline, pottery was coiled or hand-thrown, then fired in makeshift earth kiln pits or over open fire at 400-650˚C (750-1200˚F). The Cortaillod was marked by rudimentary, small, flat-bottomed forms with thinner walls. The key difference between Pfyn and Cortaillod pottery is size, as Pfyn pottery tends to be larger, but that is the sole contrast. Pfyn and Cortaillod pottery are generally very similar. The cutoff of Horgen pottery is more obvious, as there is a clear setback in quality from the Pfyn time period. Horgen pottery is thicker and heavier, less decorated, and fired at inconsistent temperatures, yielding simple ceramics of poorer quality. Schnurkeramik ceramics were much higher quality and featured impressive decorations. Schnurkeramik potters would use wrapped cord as a stamp around the neck or belly of a vase, giving the culture its "Corded Ware" namesake. There have not been diagnostic studies done about the Robenhausen pottery in specific, but most academic precedent has used other methods to label Robenhausen as a likely Pfyn culture site. The image is an example of a piece of Robenhausen pottery, not attributed specifically to the Pfyn culture but a possible Pfyn specimen.

=== Threads ===
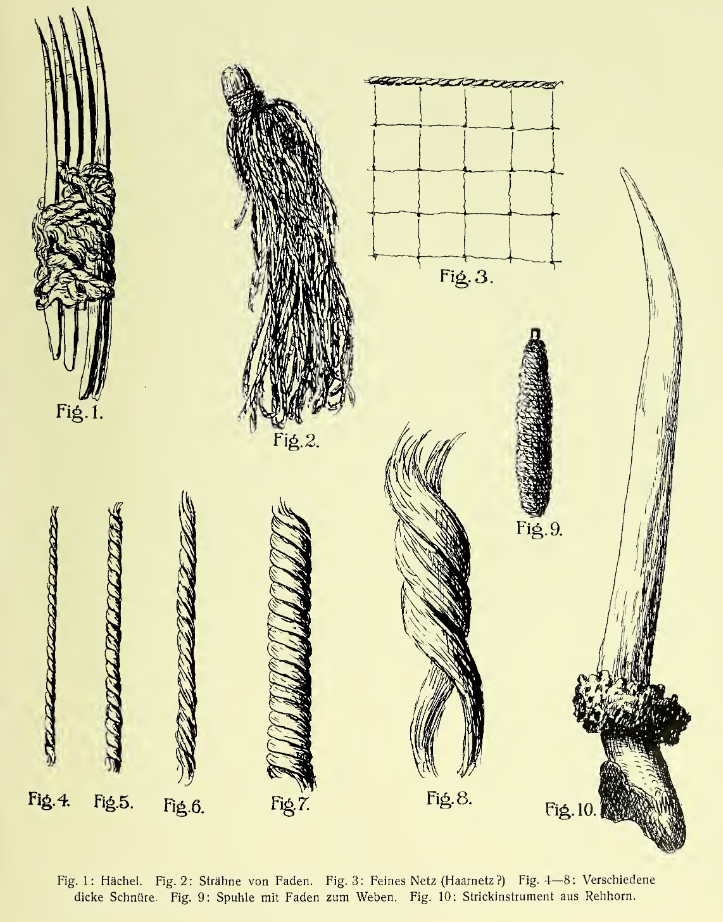
Fig. 1: Hackle. Fig. 2: Strand of thread. Fig. 3: Fine net (hairnet?). Figs. 4–8: Various.

A pilot study conducted by the British Museum indicates that the makeup of the threads incorporated into each of the textiles is largely flax, young tree bark, and marsh reeds. Little to no evidence of animal fiber use has been found so far. Fibers were likely gathered into clumps, then brushed straight using blackthorn branch combs. Pieces of wood with blackthorn thorns stuck in them with microscopic flax fibers caught in the joints have been found at nearby sites, though not at Robenhausen. Combed flax fibers were then looped (or given a "pile") and spun on wooden spindles in either S or Z twists, with preference for S twists, forming raw flax threads. The British Museum's pilot study found that some of the raw threads had been treated with a few kinds of resin. While they were unable to determine the source of the resins, they found that one was soluble in methanol, one in dichloromethane, and a third was unextricable but black and glossy. Threads spun the same way could be plied into rope spun the opposite way—for example, a British Museum fragment features three counterclockwise, or S, strands twisted clockwise, or Z-wise, to make a three-ply sZ rope.

=== Textiles and Basketry ===
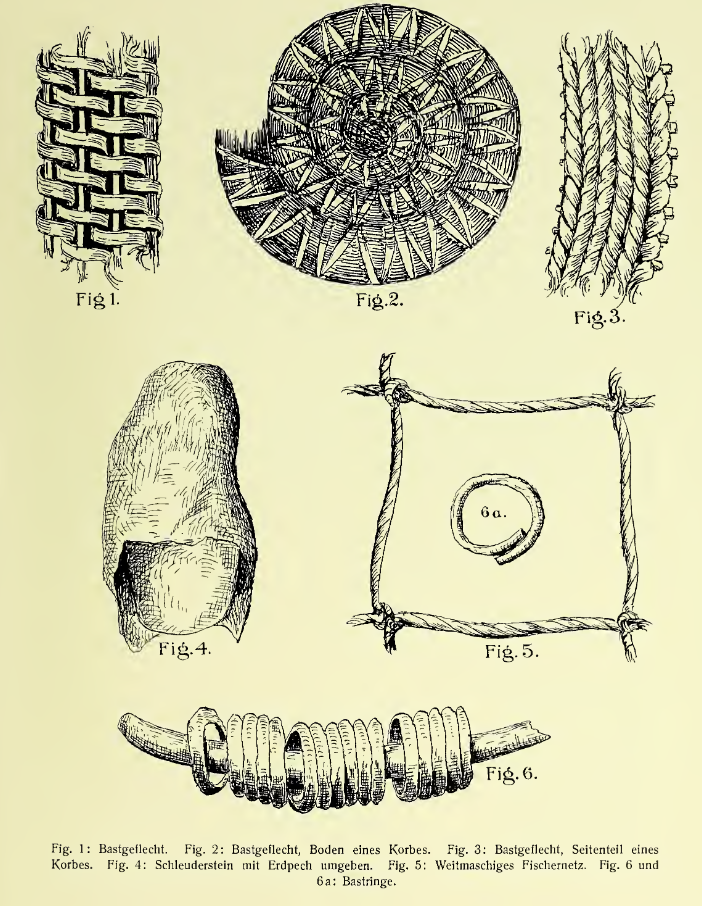
Fig. 1: Wickerwork. Fig. 2: Wickerwork, base of a basket. Fig. 3: Wickerwork, side panel of a Korbes. Fig. 4: Sling stone surrounded by pitch. Fig. 5: Wide-meshed fishing net. Fig. 6 and 6a: Bast rings.

Textiles in the British Museum's collection include fragments of coarsely woven nets, baskets, plied rope, twine, plain weave fabric, and flax fibers pre-spinning. All textiles currently photographed and stored at the British Museum were exclusively woven with S threads on both the warp, or the up-and-down direction, and the weft, or the left-and-right direction, in a plain-weave, or over-under-over-under, pattern. The thread count of each plain weave textile, or the number of threads packed into the weave per square inch, lands between 10 and 20. Though baskets and textiles found at Robenhausen use the same starting rope, the British Museum differentiates basketry from textile by the distance between weaves. If the shred contains two different weights of thread, such as a plied sZ rope on the warp and a plain S thread on the weft, and it contains a larger distance between threads on the warp than on the weft, it is tagged as basketry. For example, one such piece of basketry in the Museum's collection has a thread count of 6-8 per inch on the warp, but 15-19 per millimeter on the weft.

Neolithic Weaving at Wetzikon-Robenhausen

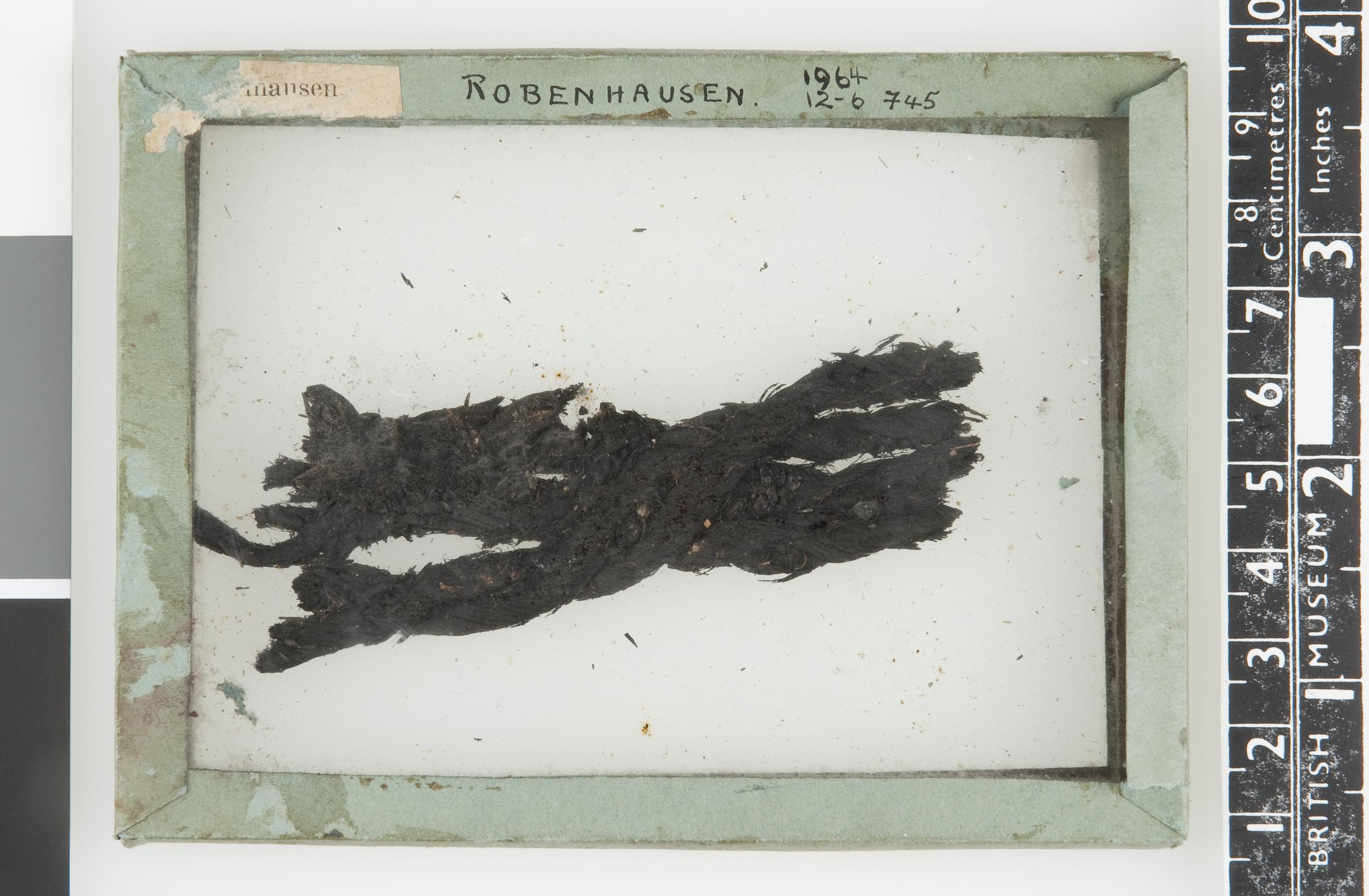
Three-ply sZ-twist rope found at Wetzikon-Robenhausen, currently stored at the British Museum.

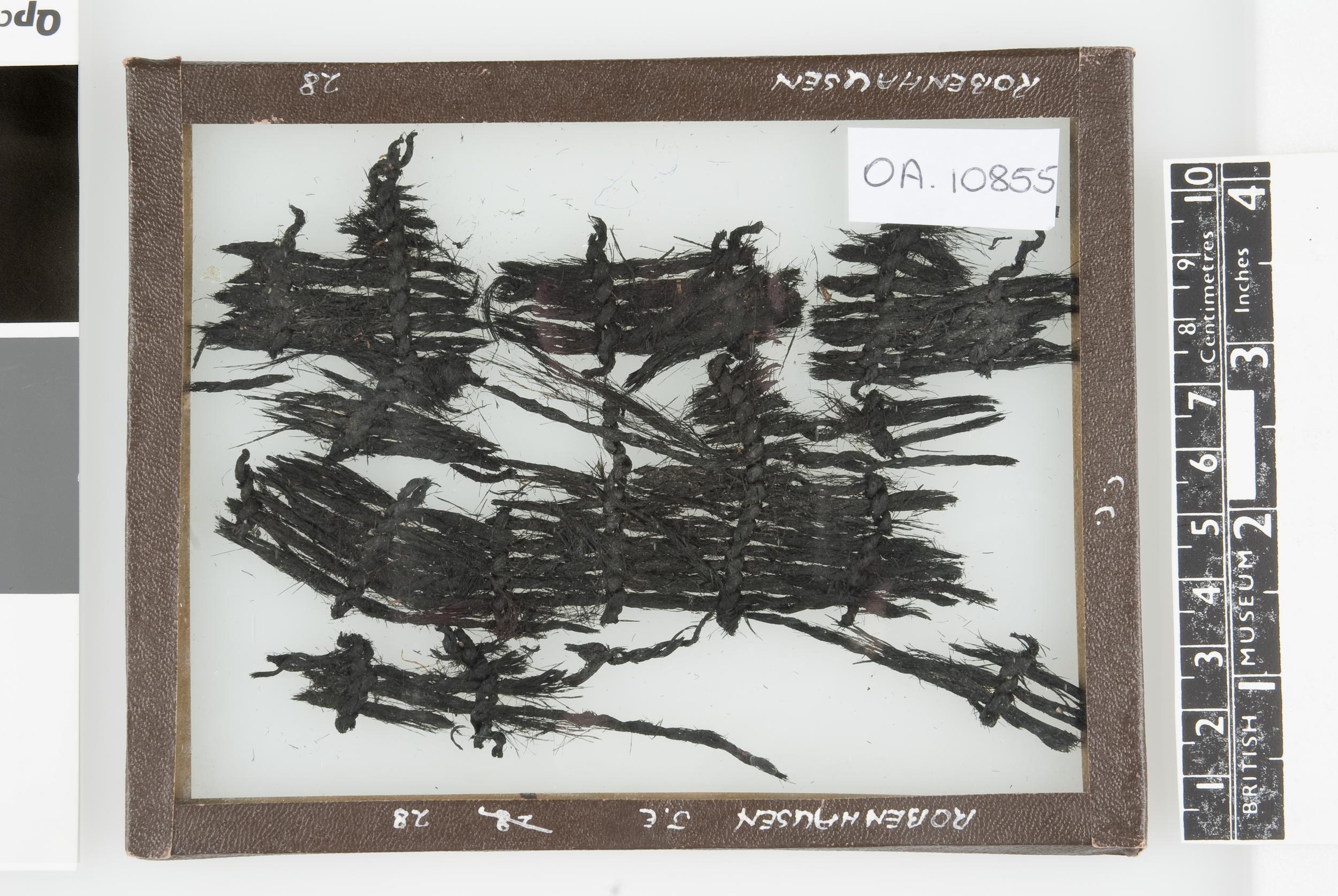
An example of medium-coarsely woven, open-twined basketry found at Robenhausen currently stored at the British Museum.

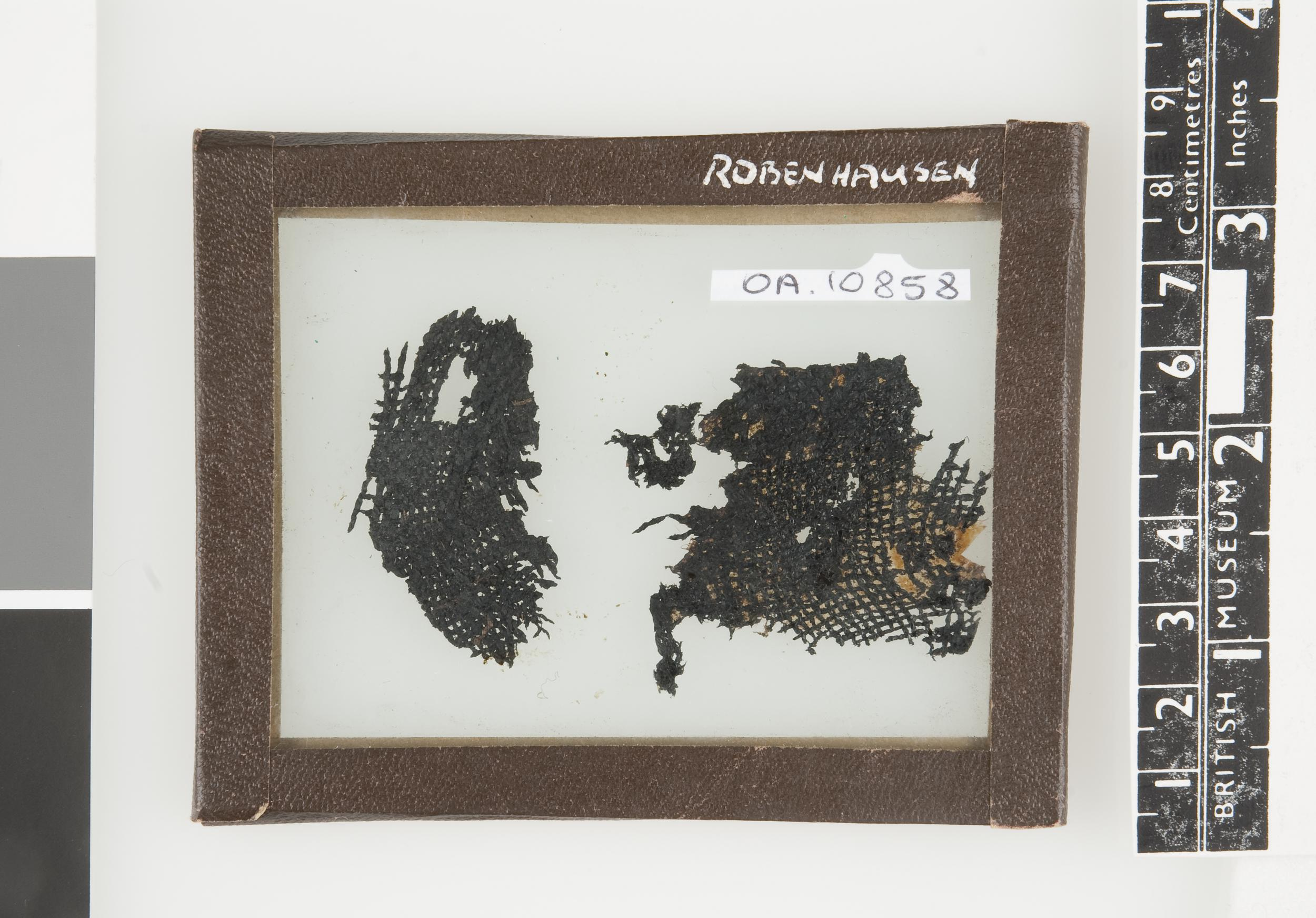
Two shreds of plain-weave textile found at Wetzikon-Robenhausen, S warp and S weft, thread count of 10 on the warp and weft on both fragments.

=== Robenhausen Door ===
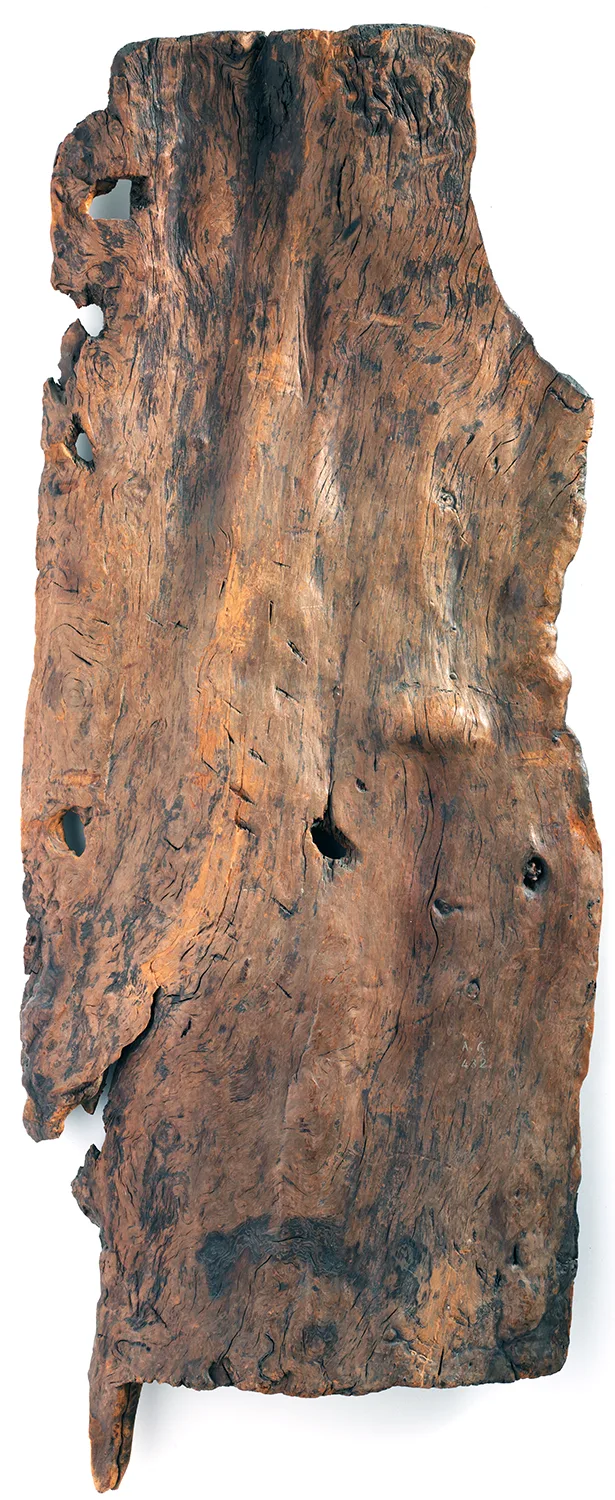
A piece of sapwood with holes bored into one side, thought to be a Neolithic door. Exhibited at the Swiss National Museum.

An emergency recovery excavation at the site of a future underground parking lot near Lake Zurich in Switzerland yielded a 5,000-year-old piece of sapwood first presumed to be a chest lid or a wall, later determined to be a door. It is theorized to have been attached to a doorframe using leather or flax cording through the holes bored along one of its sides. Rather than grain marks showing it to be a cross-section of a large tree, it is likely the piece of wood it is made from was peeled off of heartwood, stripped of bark with hewing tools, and pressed flat. This manufacturing method makes normal wood dating methods impossible, but carbon-14 dating puts the piece in the range of 4,700-5,300 years old, making it the current oldest door in the world. It is currently on display in the "Archaeology in Switzerland" exhibit at the Landes Museum in Switzerland.

== See also ==
- Prehistoric pile dwellings around Zürichsee

== Literature ==
- Peter J. Suter, Helmut Schlichtherle et al.: Pfahlbauten – Palafittes – Palafitte. Palafittes, Biel 2009. ISBN 978-3-906140-84-1.
- Pfahlbaufieber. Von Antiquaren, Pfahlbaufischern, Altertümerhändlern und Pfahlbaumythen. Mitteilungen der Antiquarischen Gesellschaft in Zürich, volume 71. Chronos, Zürich 2004. ISBN 978-3-0340-0672-9
