= Horgen occidental =

Late Neolithic culture in western Switzerland

Horgen occidental is an archaeological culture of the Late Neolithic (Spätneolithikum) found in western Switzerland between 3400 and 3000 BC. The term Port-Conty is applied to the early phase, around 3400 BC, to distinguish it from the Horgen occidental proper. The Horgen occidental was succeeded by the Lüscherz culture (approximately 2900–2700 BC).

It is distinguished from the Horgen culture in the strict sense — the contemporary culture of central and eastern Switzerland (around 3300–2800 BC), which derives from the Pfyn culture — in that the Horgen occidental shows a comparable impoverishment of ceramic forms but originates from the Cortaillod culture and from Port-Conty.

== Pottery ==
The ceramics found in assemblages dated to about 3400 BC at the sites of Twann (lower Horgen layer), Sutz-Lattrigen–Riedstation and Nidau–BKW show a continuous evolution from the late Cortaillod of western Switzerland: vessel manufacture becomes increasingly coarse, accompanied by an impoverishment of forms in favor of jars. S-profiles are less sinuous, the rims are turned outward just below the lip, are straight or inturned, and the bases are all flat, sometimes raised and slightly projecting outward. Decorations consist of bosses placed well below the rim, as well as incised lines.

Although a continuous development of forms is perceptible, the conical and elongated lower bodies of the jars around 3400 BC, as well as the flat and raised bases, show similarities with the late Pfyn / early Horgen at the lakeside sites of Zurich and Constance (notably Arbon–Bleiche 3). Between 3200 and 3000 BC, forms continued to be simplified, moving from slightly bulging to slightly conical profiles, and then to straight profiles with flat or raised bases. Flutes below the rim, "stepped" rims (abgetreppt) and simple horizontal grooves are characteristic. Unlike the (eastern) Horgen of the Lake Zurich region, rows of perforations and multiple horizontal grooves on the rim are absent.

== Tools, settlements and burials ==
The stone blades of axes are fitted into tenoned sleeves of cervid antler, and the number of specimens with marked flanges increases up to about 3000 BC. Villages consist of houses arranged in close order; shortly before 3200 BC, their construction having undergone a 90-degree rotation compared with the preceding centuries, the eaves façade is now parallel to the shore. With the exception of clay screeds for the hearths inside the houses, no trace of flooring has been identified. Burials are rare, but multiple inhumations, such as those of the dolmen of Oberbipp, perpetuate funerary customs of western origin.

== Bibliography ==
- Société suisse de préhistoire et d'archéologie (ed.): La Suisse du Paléolithique à l'aube du Moyen-Age. De l'homme de Néandertal à Charlemagne, vol. 2, 1995.
- Stöckli, Werner E.: Chronologie und Regionalität des jüngeren Neolithikums (4300-2400 v.Chr.) im Schweizer Mittelland, in Süddeutschland und in Ostfrankreich aufgrund der Keramik und der absoluten Datierungen, ausgehend von den Forschungen in den Feuchtbodensiedlungen der Schweiz, 2009.
- Stöckli, Werner E.: Urgeschichte der Schweiz im Überblick (15'000 v.Chr.-Christi Geburt). Die Konstruktion einer Urgeschichte, 2016.
