= Auvernier–La Saunerie =

Neolithic lakeside settlement

Auvernier - La Saunerie
- Interactive map of Auvernier - La Saunerie
- Type: Neolithic lakeside settlement
- Periods: Neolithic
- Cultures: Cortaillod, Lüscherz, Auvernier culture
- Location: Milvignes, Canton of Neuchâtel, Switzerland

History
- Built: c. 3637–2434 BC
- Condition: Entirely backfilled
- Archaeologists: Paul Vouga, Christian Strahm, Jean-Luc Boisaubert
- Excavation dates: 1919–1975

Site notes
- Area: 3.2 hectares (7.9 acres)

Auvernier - La Saunerie is a Neolithic lakeside settlement located in the former municipalities of Auvernier and Colombier, now part of Milvignes in the Canton of Neuchâtel, Switzerland. The site is situated on the northern shore of Lake Neuchâtel and was inscribed as a UNESCO World Heritage Site in 2011 as part of the Prehistoric Pile Dwellings around the Alps.

== Geography and context ==
The bay of Auvernier is a vast area situated between the base of the castle of Colombier and the former port of Auvernier. This zone and its surroundings represent the most densely exploited and populated region of the Canton of Neuchâtel during prehistory, particularly during the era of the Lüscherz culture, where six villages succeeded one another or were occupied simultaneously. For convenience, the site of La Saunerie was attributed to Auvernier, although it extends partly over the territory of Colombier.

== Discovery ==
The station was discovered during the exceptional drought of the winter of 1853–1854, like many pile dwelling sites in Switzerland. At that time, it was located 100 meters from the shore and partially exposed, revealing a slight mound formed from an accumulation of pebbles from which piles protruded, or a Steinberg (ténevière in French) according to the description of Édouard Desor in 1861. It appears on several cartographic surveys of the bay of Auvernier, carried out by Colonel Louis-Alphonse de Mandrot in 1878 and 1880, then by cartographer Maurice Borel in 1905.

== Archaeological investigations ==
Under the direction of Paul Vouga, the Neuchâtel Commission for Prehistoric Archaeology undertook the first methodical exploration of the site, opening test trenches in 1919, then between 1920 and 1930. These works marked the beginning of Vouga's research aimed at establishing a classification of the "lacustrine Neolithic". They enabled him to divide the chronology of the Swiss Neolithic into four distinct phases: Auvernier IV - ancient "lacustrine Neolithic"; Auvernier III - Middle Neolithic; Auvernier II - Late Neolithic; Auvernier I - Chalcolithic. In 1948 and 1950, André Leroi-Gourhan and Samuel Perret conducted small excavations at several locations on the site. They not only confirmed the stratigraphy established by their predecessor, but also succeeded in identifying a new transitional horizon between the ancient and middle lacustrine Neolithic (Late Cortaillod).

Due to the construction of the A5 motorway planned through the bay of Auvernier, two major preventive archaeology operations were carried out at La Saunerie, in 1964-1965 under the direction of Christian Strahm, then conducted by Jean-Luc Boisaubert from 1972 to 1975. Inside a sheet pile cofferdam of 200 square meters, Strahm identified two archaeological horizons, corresponding to Paul Vouga's Auvernier I and II assemblages, which he subsequently attributed to a new cultural facies under the name Auvernier culture, characterized by the presence of corded ware pottery and flint daggers from Grand-Pressigny. Later, dendrochronology confirmed the insertion of the two stratigraphic horizons into two distinct occupation phases: 2634-2550 and 2550-2434 BC. Moreover, based on research conducted at the same time on sites around Lake Biel, Christian Strahm identified a new material culture - the Lüscherz group - which he attached to Paul Vouga's Middle Neolithic assemblage (Auvernier III).

The final investigations, undertaken between 1972 and 1975, revealed an important archaeological sequence connected to the cultures of the classic and late Cortaillod, the Lüscherz group, as well as the Auvernier-Cordé culture; dendrochronology provided several phases of tree felling for the Late Cortaillod (3637-3633 and 3600-3597 BC) and the Lüscherz (2784-2701 BC).

== Significance ==
With an estimated surface area of 3.2 hectares, the site of La Saunerie, today entirely backfilled, is the largest of all the sites in the bay of Auvernier. It is also the one that offers the greatest scientific potential, thus allowing numerous researchers to construct the chronology of the Swiss Neolithic, and even to define new material cultures (Late Cortaillod, Lüscherz, Auvernier-Cordé). Despite the quantity of data collected, it is still not easy to reconstruct the organization and layout of the villages in relation to one another. The La Saunerie zone appears to have been occupied first in the back of the bay during the Middle Neolithic (Cortaillod), then progressively toward the lake.

== Bibliography ==
- Viollier, David; Vouga, Paul: "Lac de Neuchâtel", in: Pfahlbauten. Zwölfter Bericht, 1930, pp. 5-43 (Mitteilungen der Antiquarischen Gesellschaft in Zürich, 30/7)
- Vouga, Paul: Le Néolithique lacustre ancien, 1934 (Recueil de travaux publiés par la Faculté des Lettres, 17)
- Strahm, Christian: "Les fouilles d'Auvernier en 1965", in: Musée neuchâtelois, 1966, no 4, pp. 145–152
- Boisaubert, Jean-Luc: Le Néolithique moyen de La Saunerie. Fouilles 1972-1975, 1982, pp. 9-72 (Cahiers d'archéologie romande, 22)
- Schifferdecker, François: "La baie d'Auvernier. Topographie et stratigraphies", in: Billamboz, André; Brochier, Jacques-Léopold: La station littorale d'Auvernier-Port. Cadre et évolution, 1982, pp. 131-141 (Cahiers d'archéologie romande, 25)
- Arnold, Béat: A la poursuite des villages lacustres neuchâtelois. Un siècle et demi de cartographie et de recherche, 2009 (Archéologie neuchâteloise, 45)
