= Auvernier culture =

Neolithic archaeological culture

- Alternative names: Auvernier-Cordé culture
- Geographical range: Western Switzerland, particularly the Three Lakes Region
- Period: Late Neolithic
- Dates: 2700–2400 BC
- Type site: Auvernier - La Saunerie
- Major sites: Portalban, Auvernier, Sutz-Lattrigen
- Preceded by: Lüscherz culture
- Followed by: Bell Beaker culture (2450/2400–2200 BC)

The Auvernier culture (also known as Auvernier-Cordé culture) is an archaeological culture of the Late Neolithic period, dating from 2700 to 2400 BC, that was widespread in Western Switzerland, particularly in the Three Lakes Region.

First described in 1969 by Christian Strahm, it takes its name from the site of Auvernier - La Saunerie. The Auvernier culture was succeeded by the Bell Beaker culture (2450/2400–2200 BC).

== Regional context ==
The Auvernier culture is also considered a regional group of the Saône-Rhône culture of eastern France (2800–2400 BC). The pottery thus shows strong similarities with that of the Rhône plain to the southwest and that of the eastern French Jura. Certain finds – barrel-shaped jars or flint dagger blades (weapons) from Grand-Pressigny (Indre-et-Loire) – testify to an evolution from the preceding Lüscherz culture, with the integration of new elements.

== Technology and material culture ==
Axe technology now shows the use of grooved bent handles with narrow bifid sleeves, as well as hammer-axes with hard rock blades. Such axes have been discovered in the central Swiss Plateau and in Eastern Switzerland in complexes of the Corded Ware culture and are part of the Central European tradition.

The evolution of pottery – hitherto mainly consisting of weakly decorated barrel-shaped vessels – shows that from around 2735 BC, locally manufactured vessels from the Three Lakes Region integrated forms and decorations from Corded Ware pottery. Flat bases and S-shaped profiles appear, as well as various types of decoration such as cord impressions, fingered cordons and incisions. The formal repertoire, which previously consisted mainly of jars, is supplemented by globular vessels decorated with incisions and fitted with eyelet handles (Strichbündelamphoren). In the Three Lakes Region, the forms and decorations of Corded Ware pottery are often combined with indigenous forms.

The resulting Auvernier-Cordé mixed culture may have been accompanied by the arrival of population groups into existing communities, as suggested by the dual origin of the finds. A comparison shows that the cord impressions on Corded Ware vessels are mainly the result of S-twist, while in the Three Lakes Region, the cords were twisted in both S and Z directions.

== Archaeological sites ==
Remains of the Auvernier-Cordé have been unearthed at many lakeside settlements in the Three Lakes Region, notably at Portalban, Auvernier and Sutz-Lattrigen. Tombs dating from this period are known, such as at Sion - Le Petit-Chasseur. Around Lake Geneva, the few contemporary sites have not to date yielded any cord-decorated vessels, which is why this region continues to be attributed to the Auvernier and not to the Auvernier-Cordé.

== Bibliography ==
- Strahm, Christian; Stampfli, Hans Rudolf: "Ausgrabungen in Vinelz 1960", in: Jahrbuch des Bernischen Historischen Museums, 45–46, 1965–1966, pp. 283–318.
- Strahm, Christian: "Die späten Kulturen", in: Société suisse de préhistoire et d'archéologie (ed.): Ur- und frühgeschichtliche Archäologie der Schweiz, vol. 2, 1969, pp. 97–116.
- Société suisse de préhistoire et d'archéologie (ed.): La Suisse du Paléolithique à l'aube du Moyen-Age. De l'homme de Néandertal à Charlemagne, vol. 2, 1995.
- Stöckli, Werner E.: Chronologie und Regionalität des jüngeren Neolithikums (4300-2400 v.Chr.) im Schweizer Mittelland, in Süddeutschland und in Ostfrankreich aufgrund der Keramik und der absoluten Datierungen, ausgehend von den Forschungen in den Feuchtbodensiedlungen der Schweiz, 2009.
- Stöckli, Werner E.: Urgeschichte der Schweiz im Überblick (15'000 v.Chr.-Christi Geburt). Die Konstruktion einer Urgeschichte, 2016.
- Suter, Peter J.; Affolter, Jehanne et al.: Um 2700 v.Chr. – Wandel und Kontinuität in den Ufersiedlungen am Bielersee, 2 vol., 2017.
