= Cortaillod culture =

Neolithic culture in Switzerland

- Geographical range: Valais, West and Central Switzerland.
- Period: Later Neolithic, Chalcolithic
- Dates: 3900-3500 BC
- Preceded by: Classic Cortaillod, Early Cortaillod, La Hoguette culture, Cardial culture
- Followed by: Horgen culture

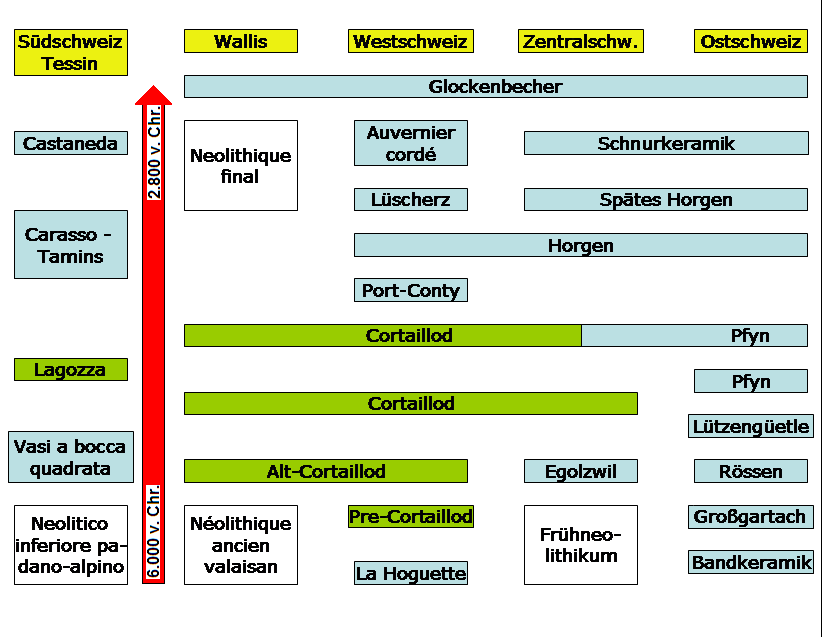
Dates and locations of prehistoric Swiss cultures

The Cortaillod culture is one of several archaeologically defined cultures belonging to the Neolithic period of Switzerland. The Cortaillod Culture in the west of the region is contemporary with the Pfyn Culture in the east and dates from between 3900-3500 BC. The Classic Cortaillod culture of the western Alpine foreland and the Early Cortaillod culture of central Switzerland pre-date this at 4300-3900 BC.

Evidence, such as higher frequencies of dog bones and pendants made from dog metapodials, suggests a special relationship between dog and man during the later part of this period in the western part and the early Horgen culture in the eastern part of the Alpine foreland.

The culture is named for the village of Cortaillod in the canton of Neuchâtel.

== Gallery ==
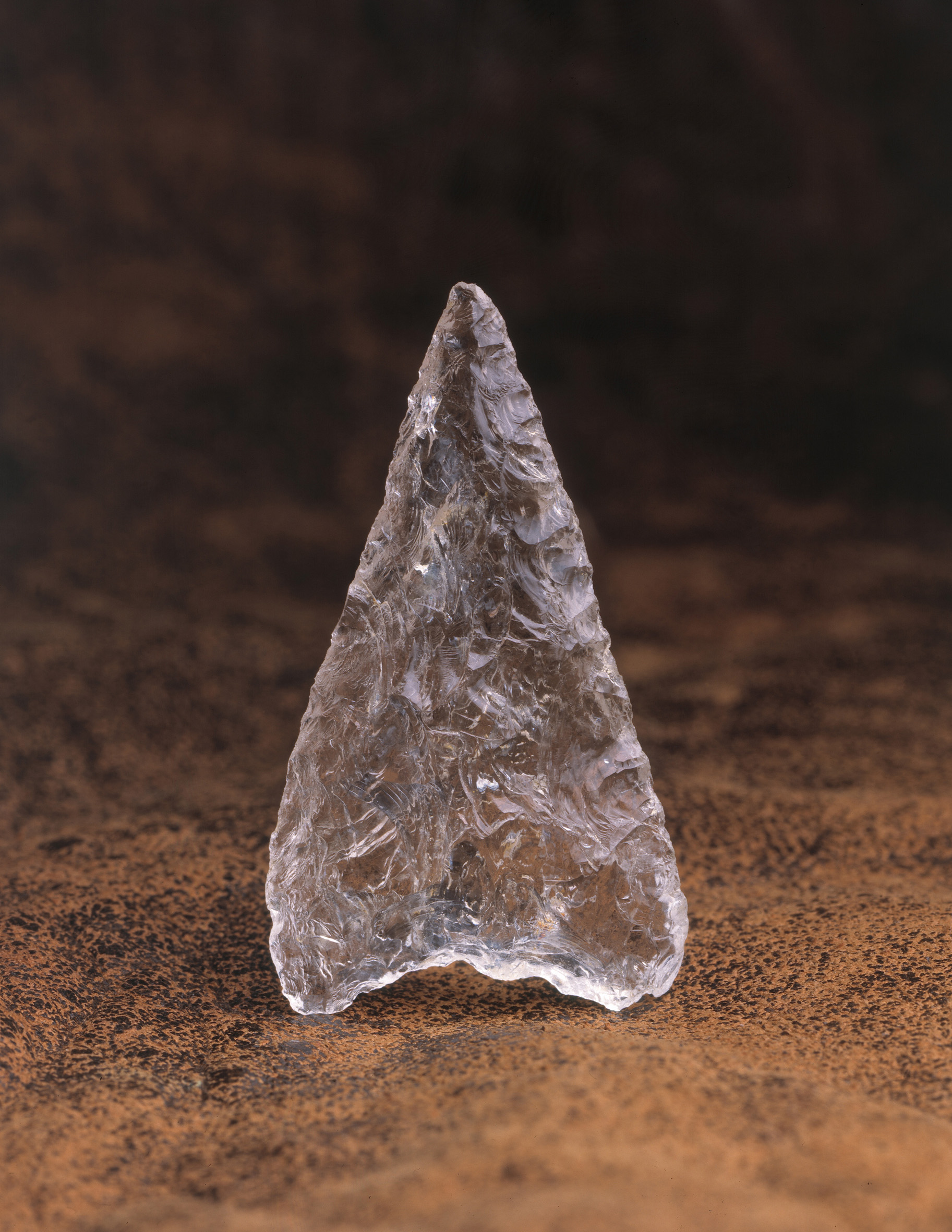
Crystal arrowhead, c. 3500 BCE

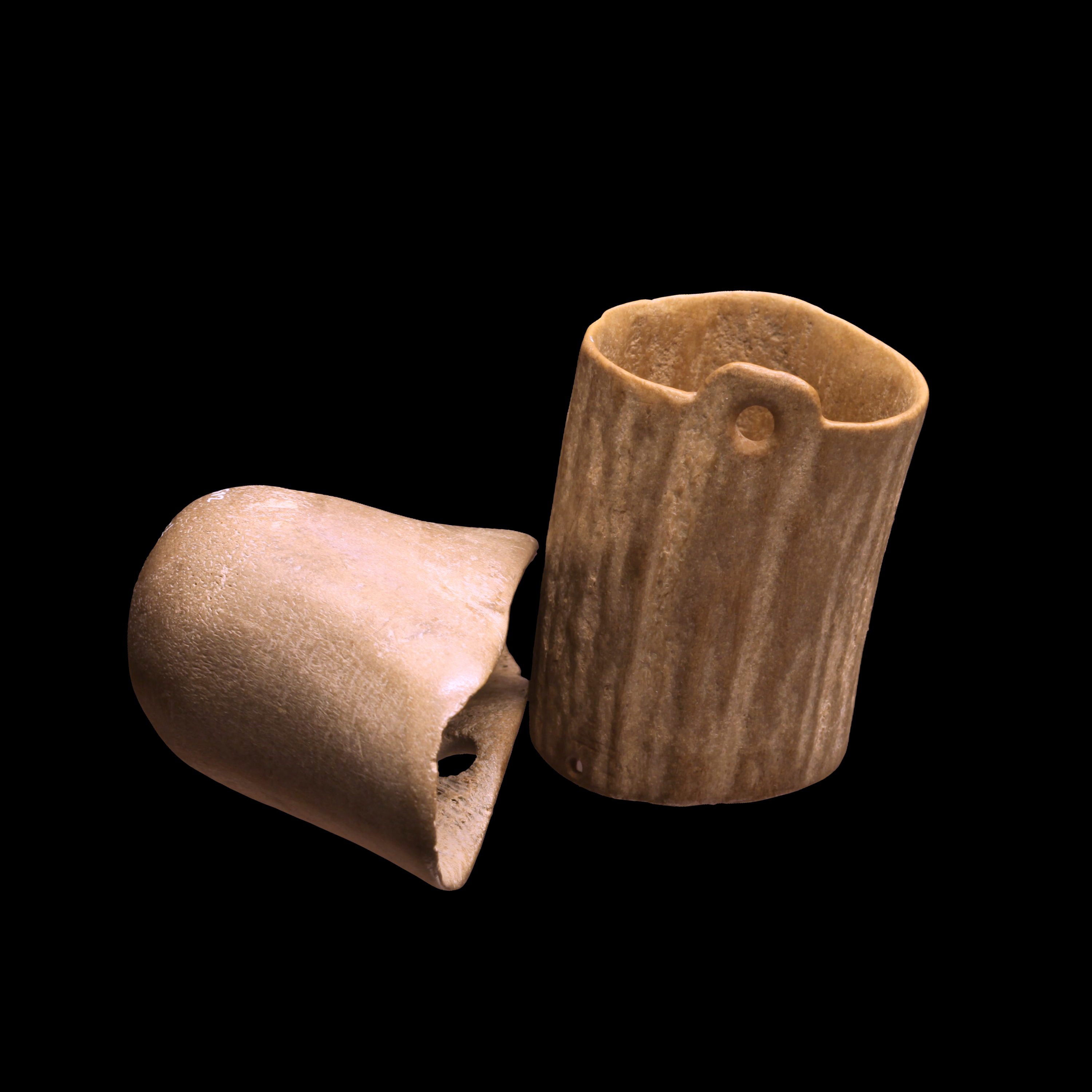
Goblets made from deer antler, c. 3580 BCE

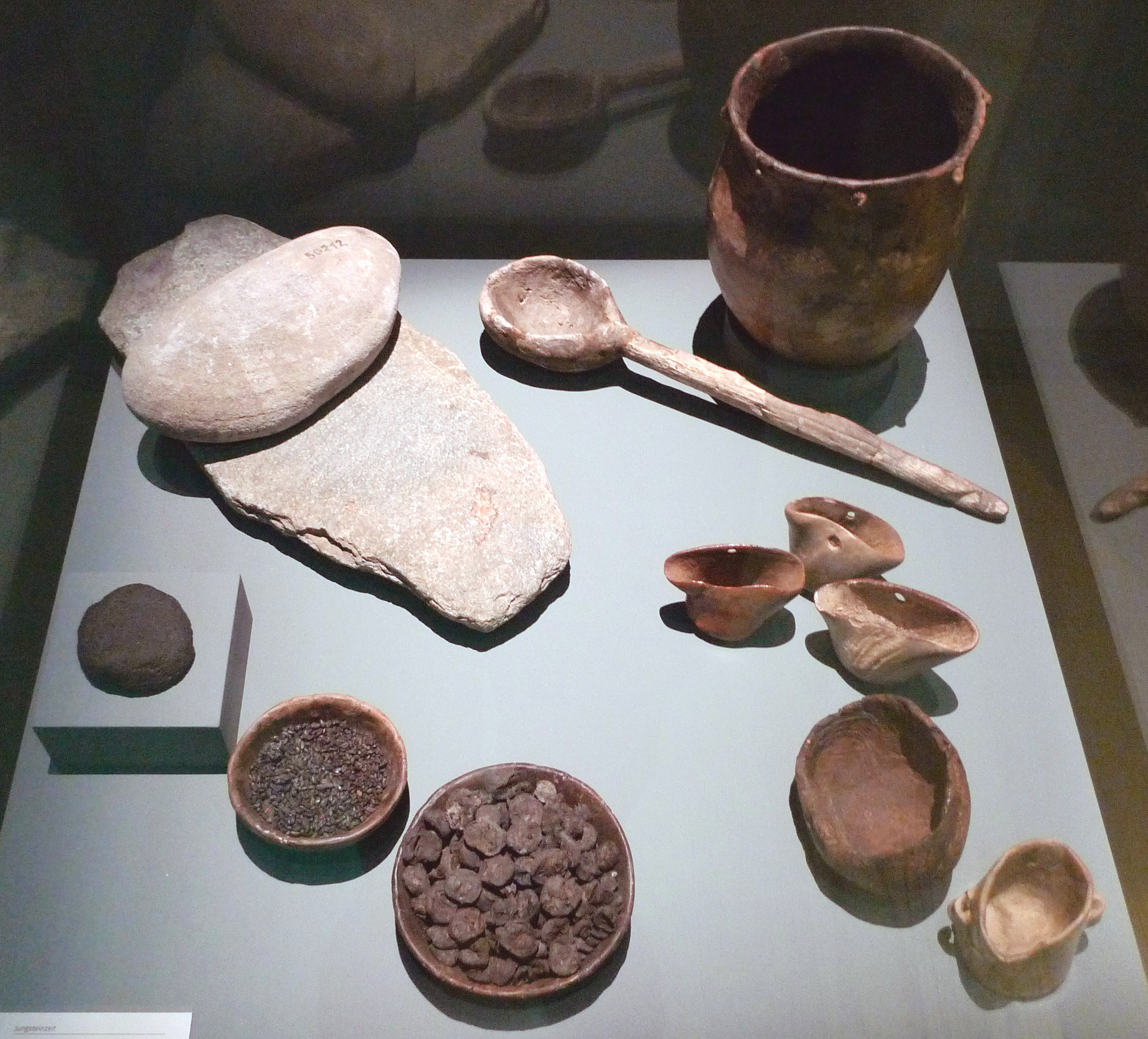
Pottery, implements and foodstuffs

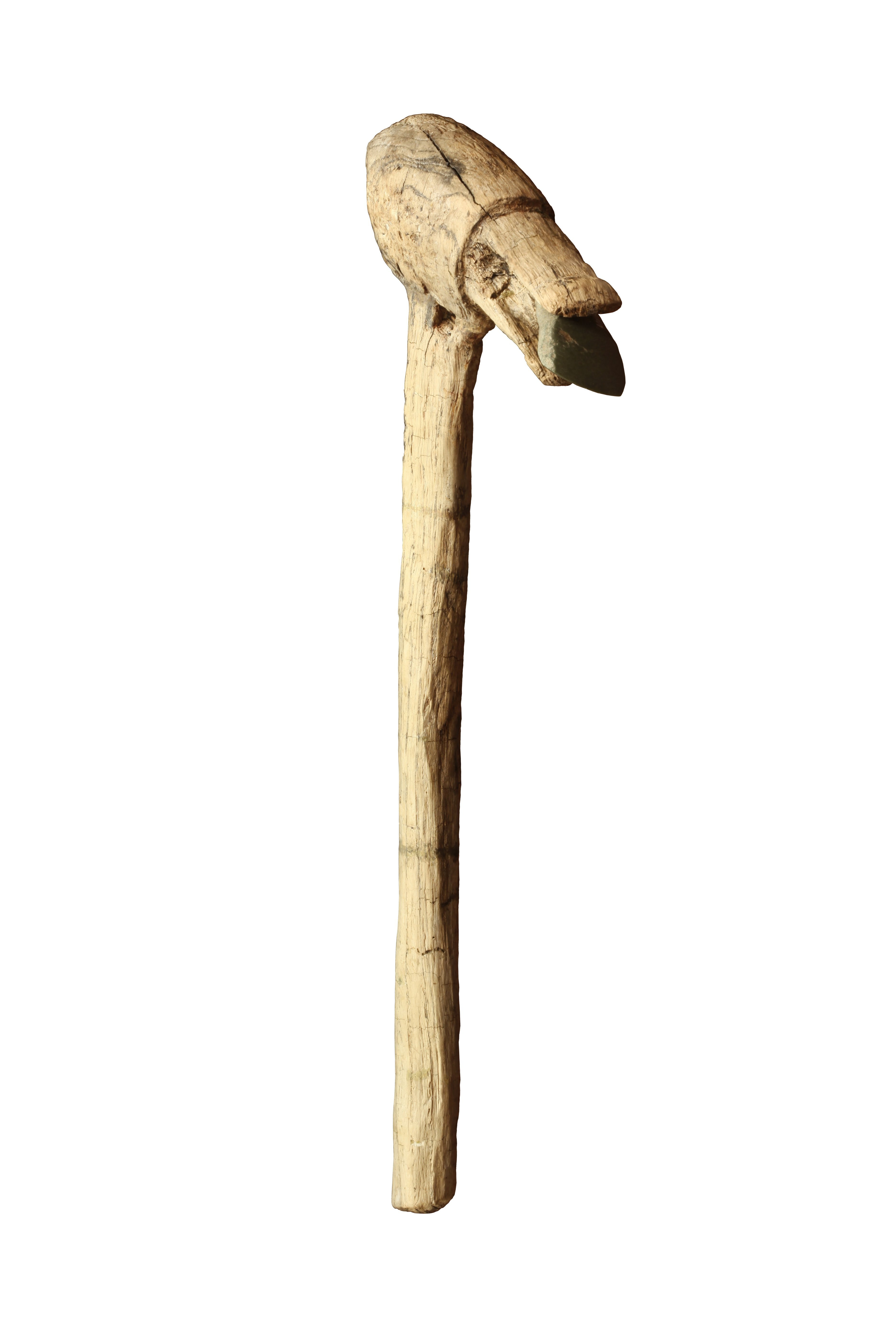
Axe

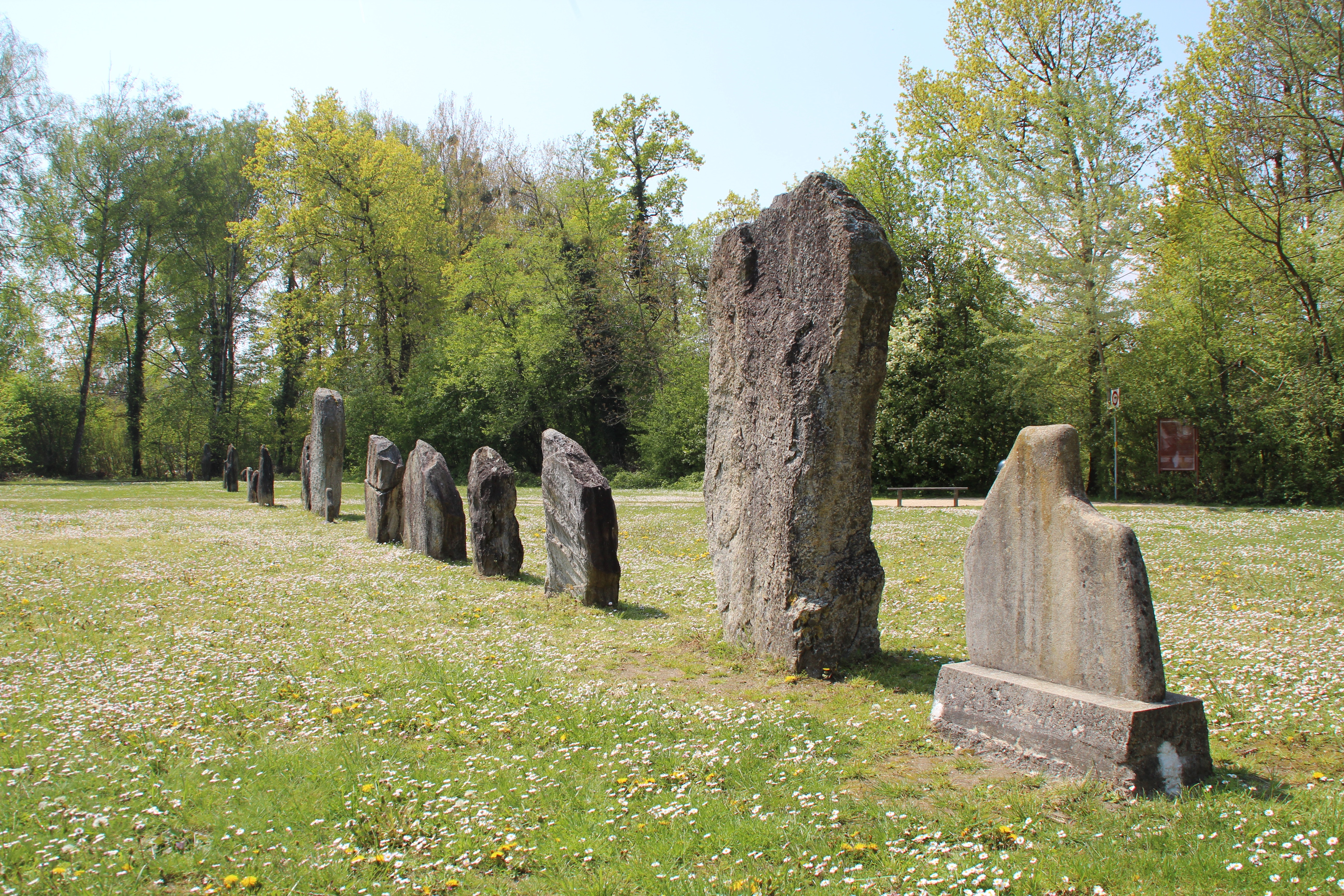
The Clendy megalithic alignment

== Sources ==
Schibler, J. 2006. The economy and environment of the 4th and 3rd millennia BC in the northern Alpine foreland based on studies of animal bones. Environmental Archaeology 11(1): 49-64
