= Horgen culture =

Neolithic culture in Switzerland

- Geographical range: Southern Germany and Switzerland near Lake Constance, Rhine river basin.
- Period: Later Neolithic, Chalcolithic
- Dates: 3,500–2,850 BC
- Characteristics: simple pottery, well-developed stone tools, lake shore settlements
- Preceded by: Pfyn culture, Cortaillod culture
- Followed by: Corded Ware culture, Bell Beaker culture, Lüscherz culture

The Horgen culture is one of several archaeological cultures belonging to the Neolithic period of Switzerland. The Horgen culture may derive from the Pfyn culture and early Horgen pottery is similar to the earlier Cortaillod culture pottery of Twann, Switzerland. It is named for one of the principal sites, in Horgen, Switzerland.

== Dates ==
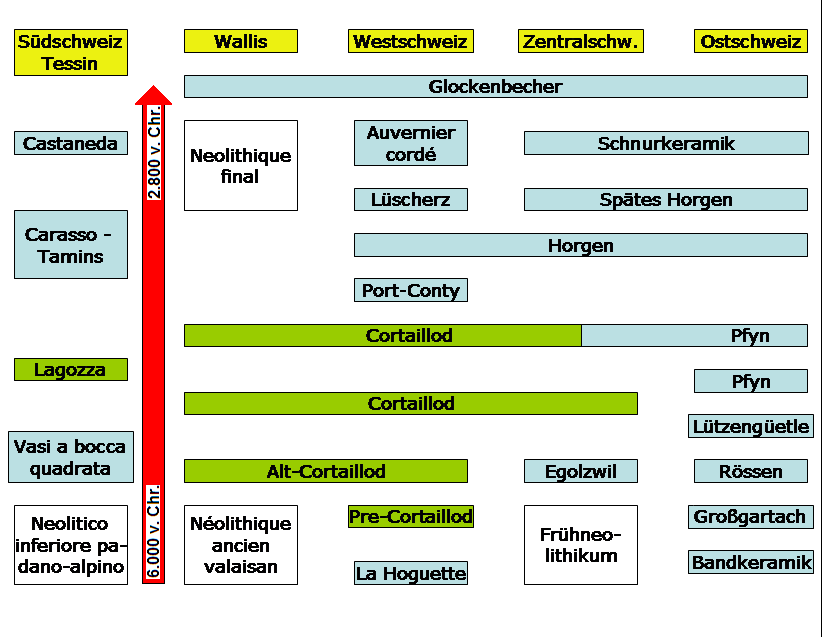
Dates and locations of prehistoric Swiss cultures

The Horgen culture started around 3500/3400 cal BC and lasted until 2850 cal BC. Tree ring dates range from 3370 – 2864 BC.

== Distribution ==
The Horgen core area is in Northern Switzerland and Southwest Germany near Lake Constance, but it may have reached farther north along the Rhine River. It may have had ties to the French Seine-Oise-Marne culture. Sites include Horgen, Hauterive-Champréves, Eschenz, and Zürich.

At Feldmeilen-Vorderfeld and Meilen on the right bank of Lake Zurich near Zürich, four layers of Pfyn culture artifacts (4350–3950 BC calibrated) are followed by five Horgen culture (3350–2950 BC) layers were found at Feldmeilen. In nearby Meilen, one Pfyn layer (4250–4000 BC) followed by three Horgen (3300–2500 BC) layers were discovered.

== Traits ==
There were three phases of pottery; early, middle, and late. The early pottery exhibits an affinity with the Pfyn and maybe the Cortaillod at Twann, Switzerland. The spindle whorls on the pottery may indicate connections to the southern Funnelbeaker culture and early Baden culture. The middle phase (found at Naschdorf-Strandbad, Lake Constance and Dullenried, Federsee) may be influenced by more westerly traditions. The final Horgen phase exhibits similarities to the Burgerroth, Wartberg, and Goldberg III cultures.

The pottery was less refined and decorated than the earlier Cortaillod culture. However, the flint industry was well developed and produced elegant stone tools.

Pigs became increasingly important during the Horgen era. Pig bones were the most common bones found in the village midden heaps, accounting for up to 70% of all bones.

The Horgen culture practiced copper smelting to a limited extent, though copper finds are rare and evidence of processing is sporadic. Ötzi the iceman, who was found with a copper axe, also had stone tools of Horgen culture type.

== Horgen occidental ==
The Horgen occidental is the western Swiss regional variant of the Horgen culture, found between 3400 and 3000 BC. Its early phase, around 3400 BC, is known as Port-Conty. Unlike the Horgen of central and eastern Switzerland, which derives from the Pfyn culture, the Horgen occidental developed from the late Cortaillod culture of western Switzerland and from Port-Conty. It shows a comparable impoverishment of ceramic forms, but lacks the rows of perforations and multiple horizontal grooves on the rim that are characteristic of the eastern Horgen of the Lake Zurich region. Key sites include Twann (Douanne), Sutz-Lattrigen–Riedstation and Nidau–BKW. The Horgen occidental was succeeded by the Lüscherz culture (approximately 2900–2700 BC).

== Gallery ==
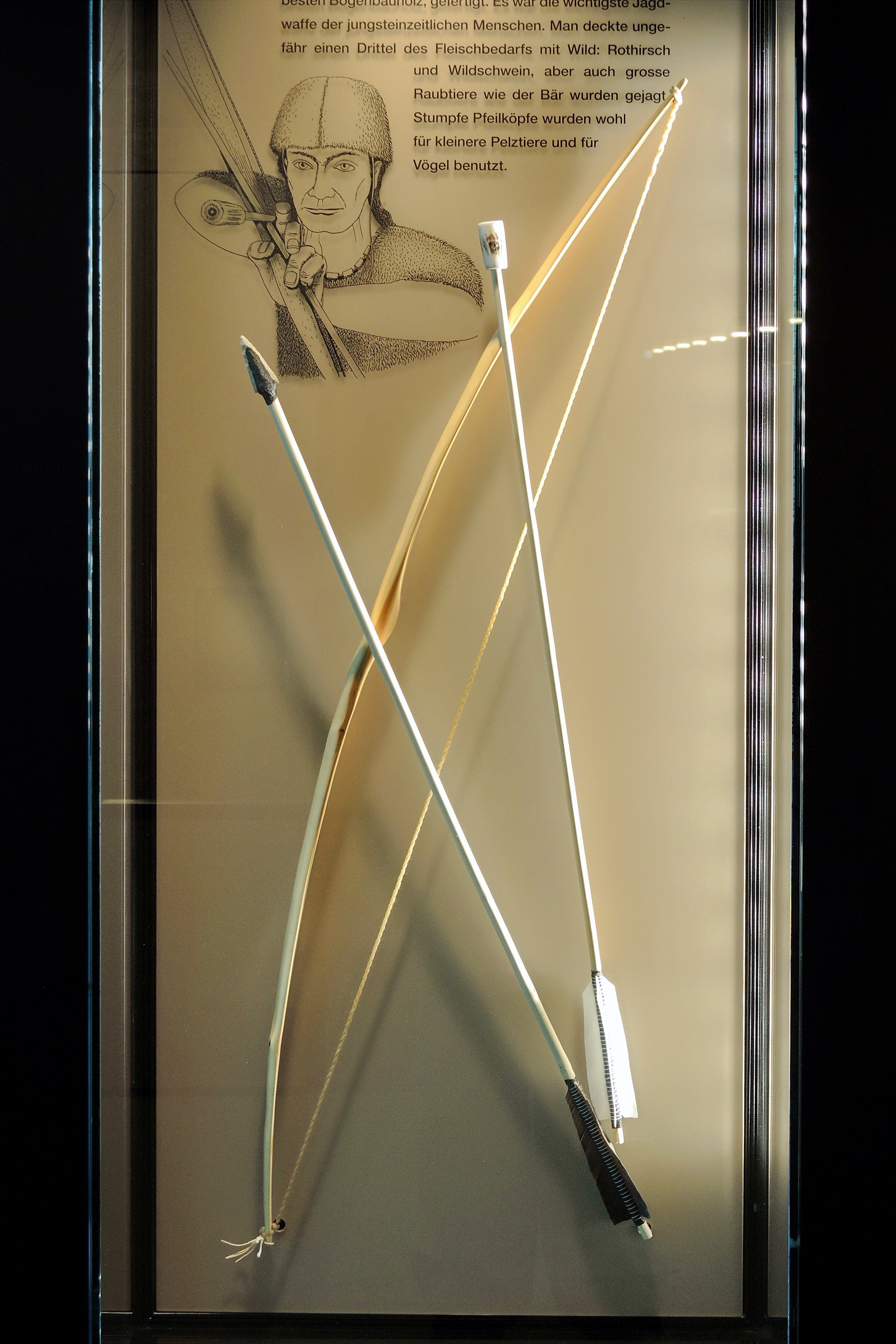
Horgen archer, reconstruction

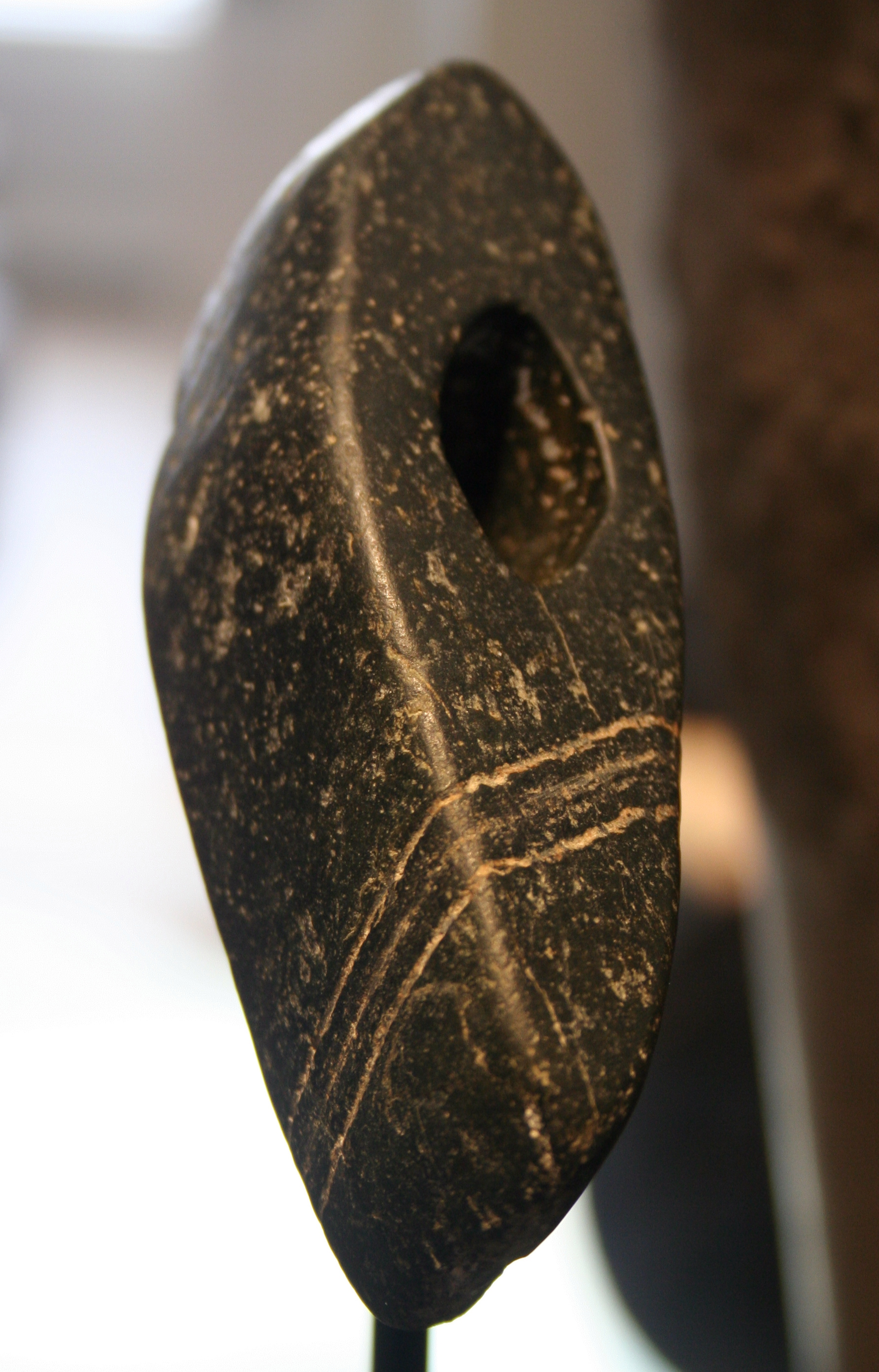

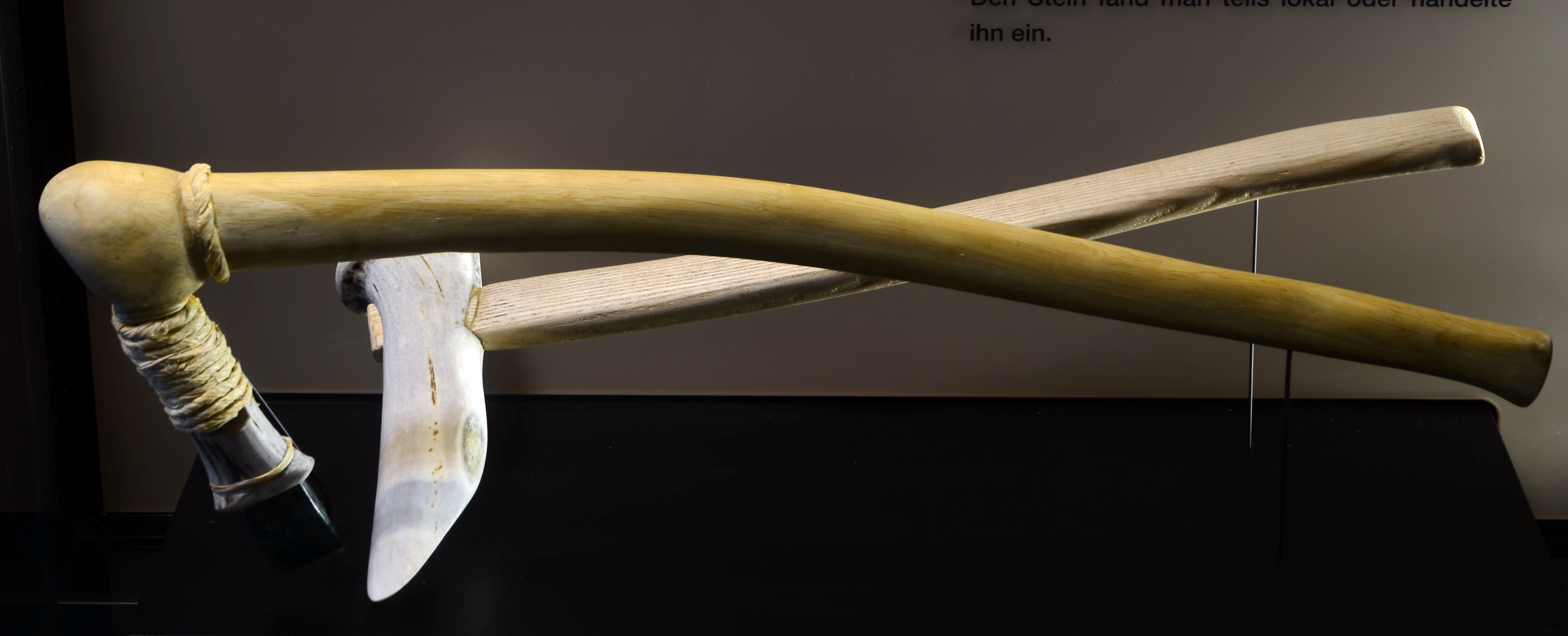

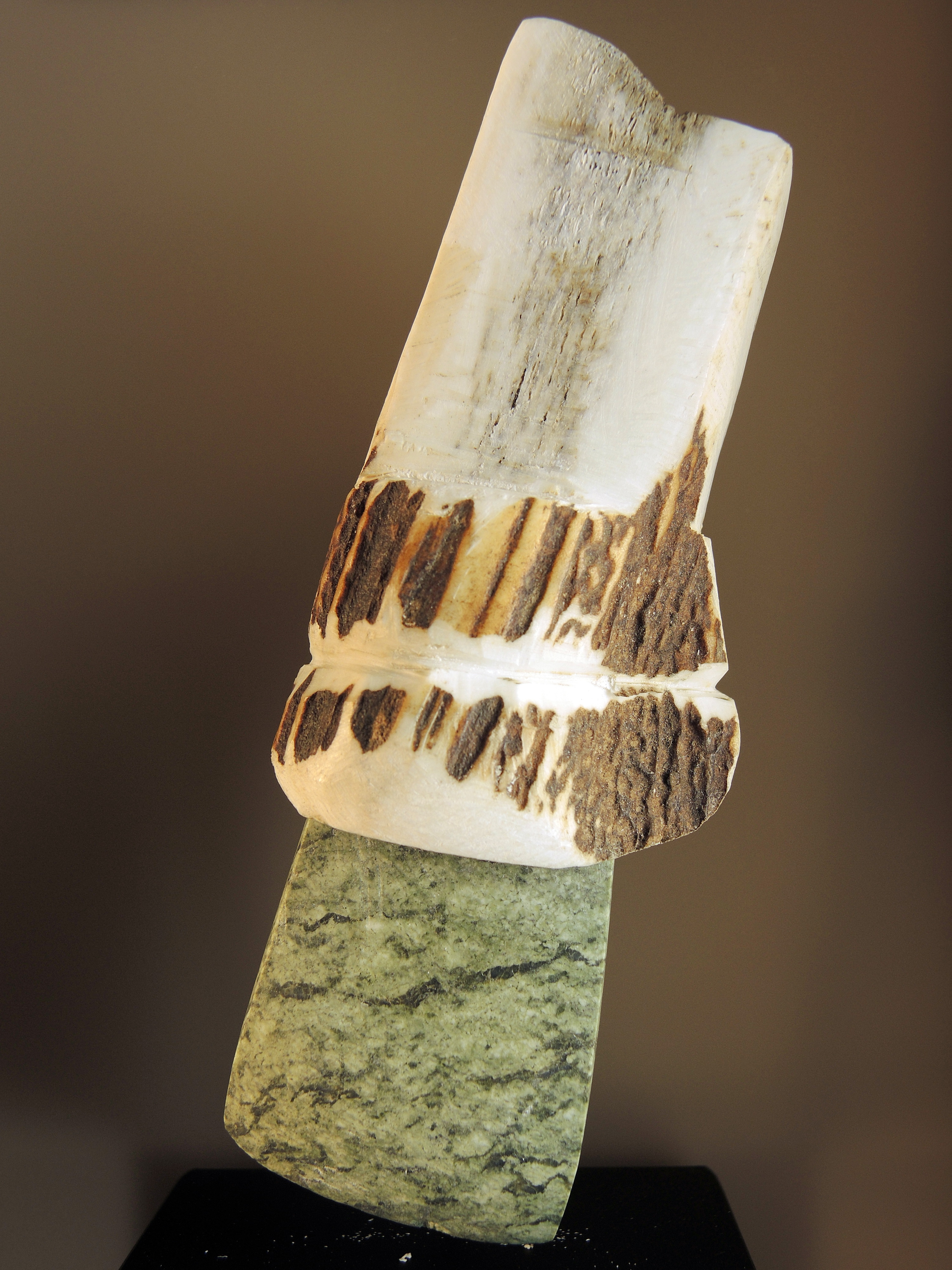

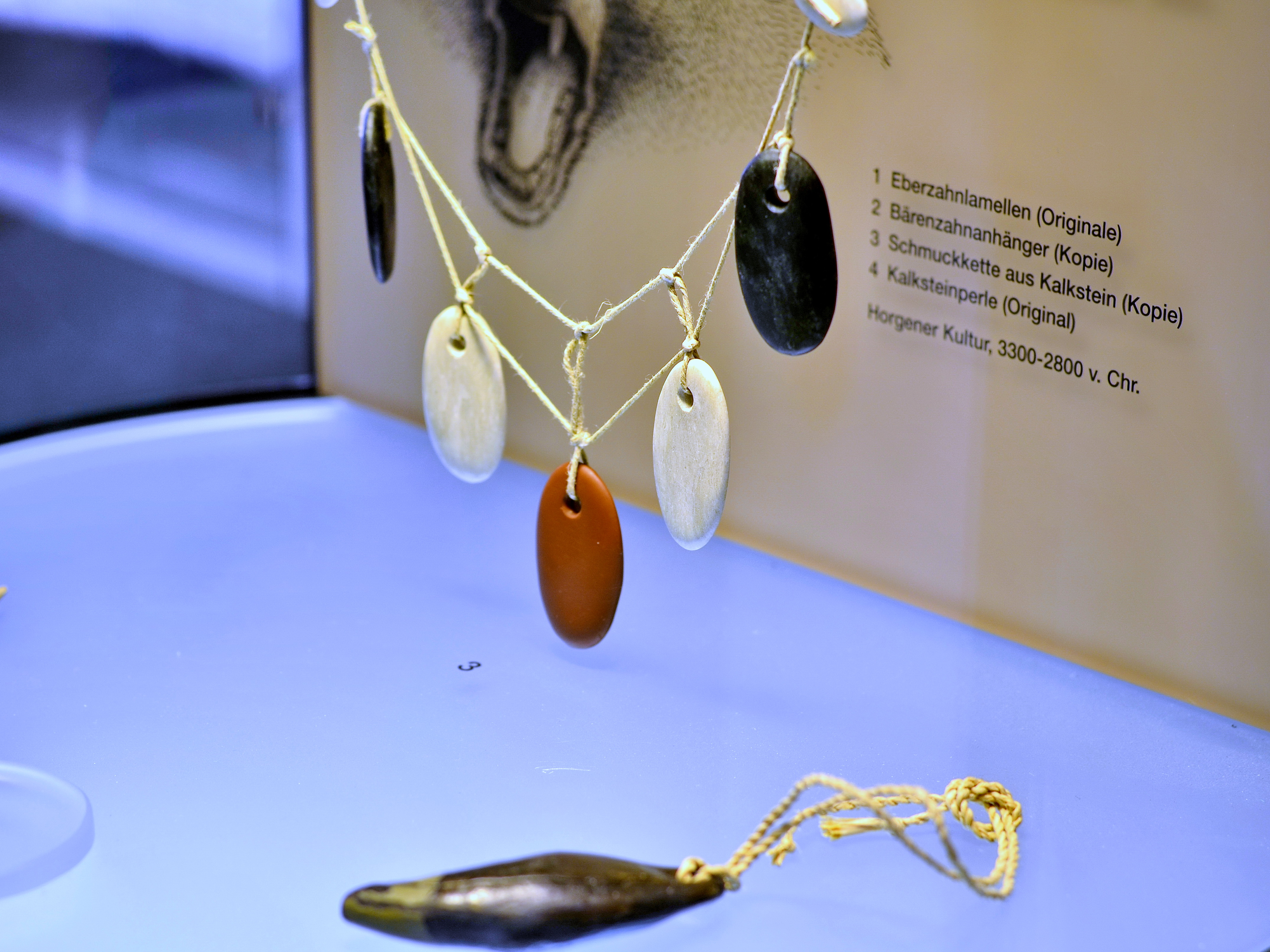

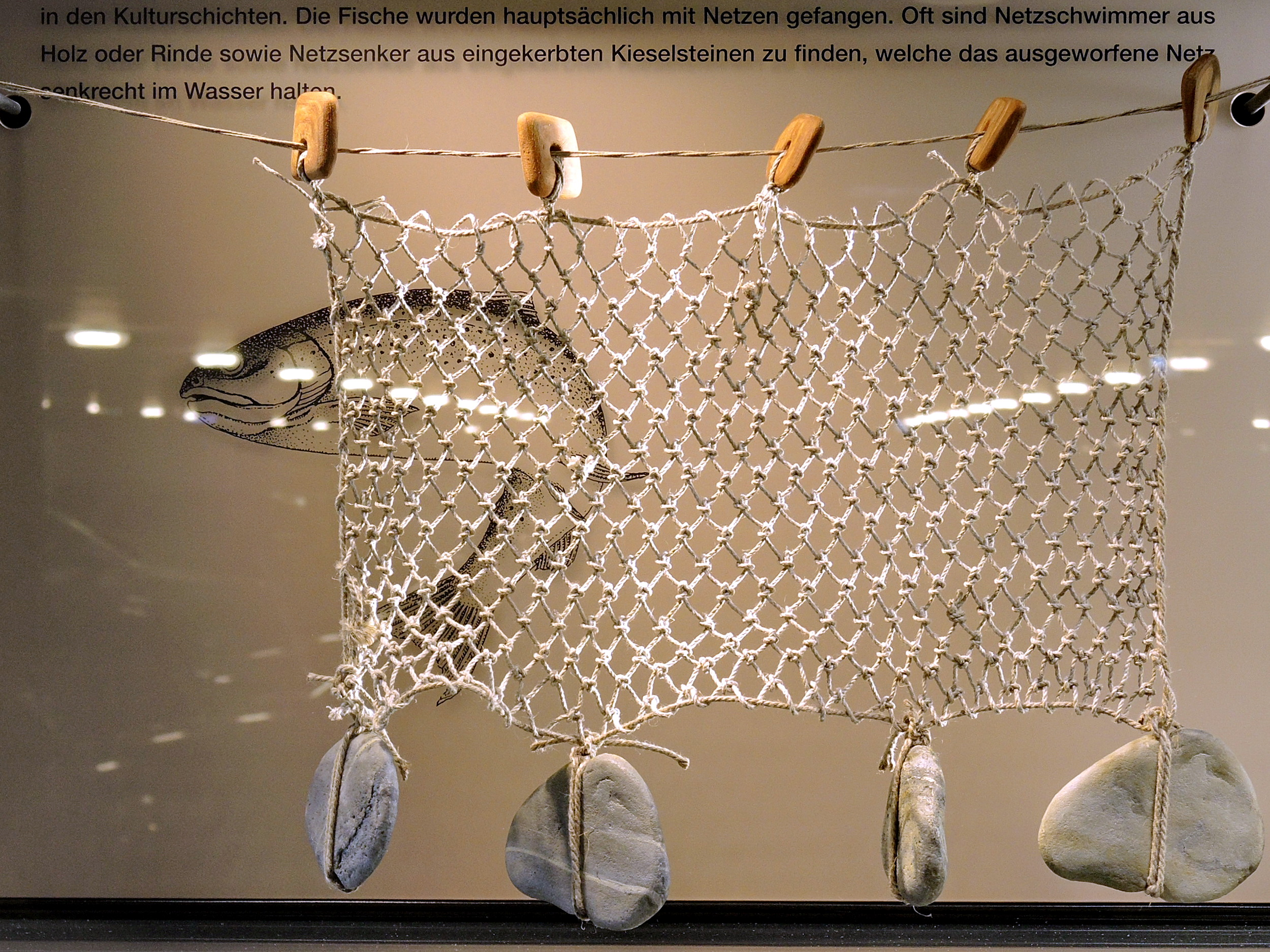

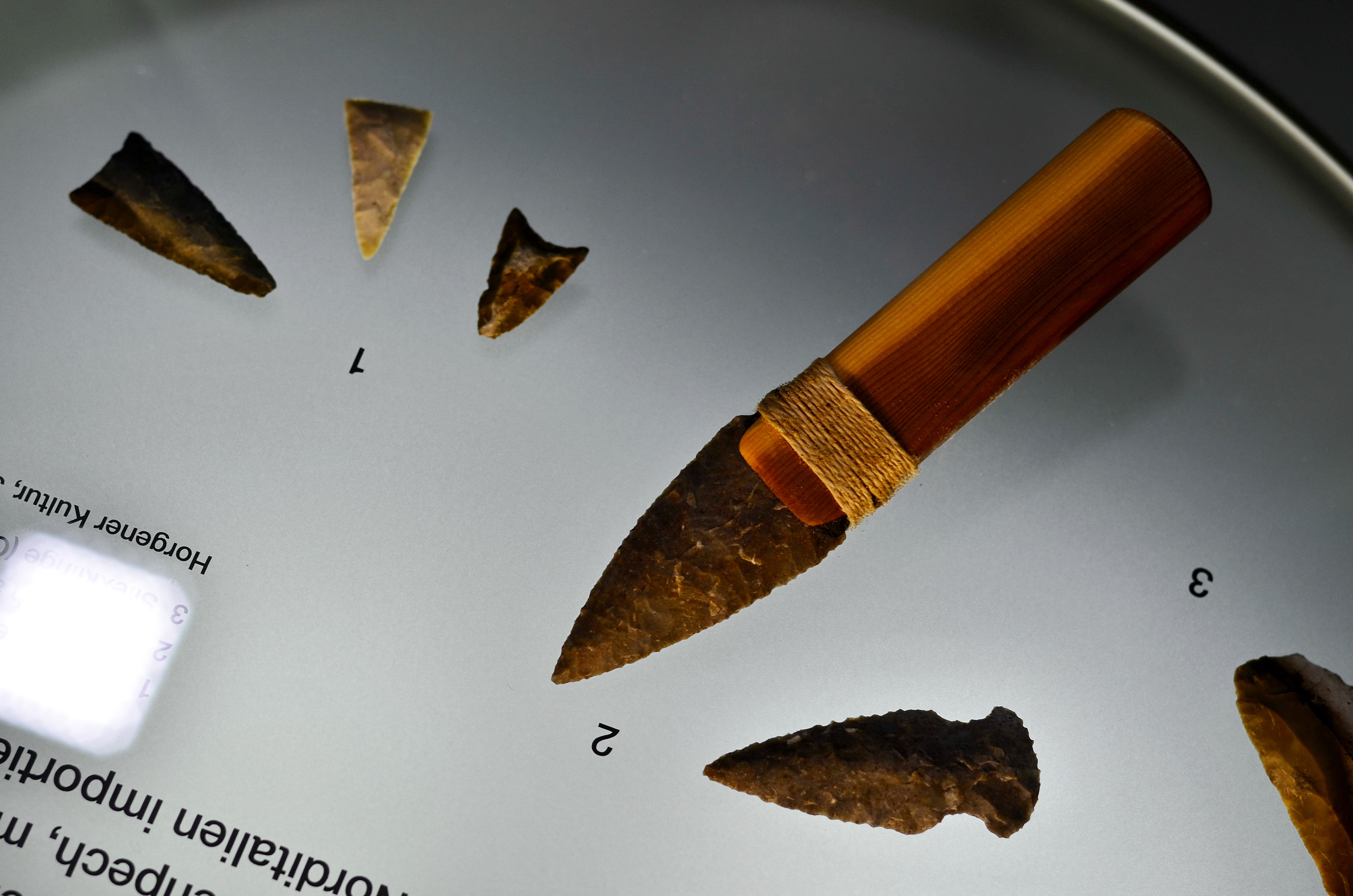

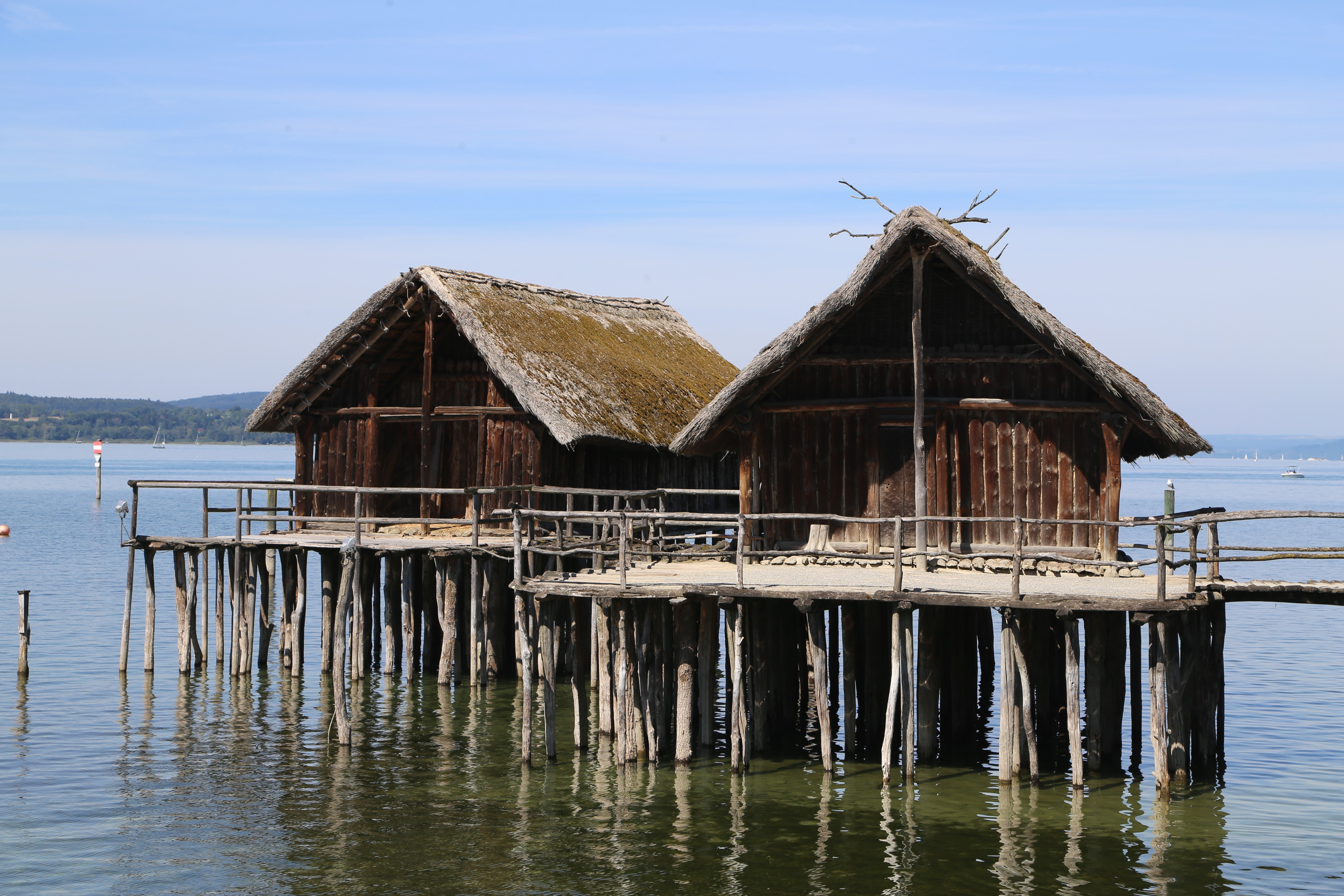

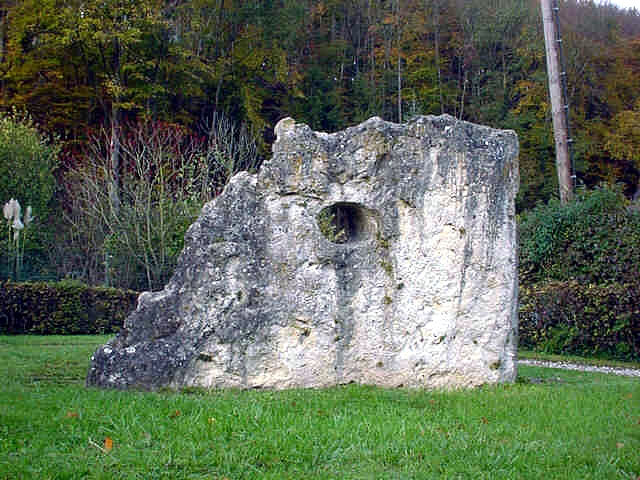

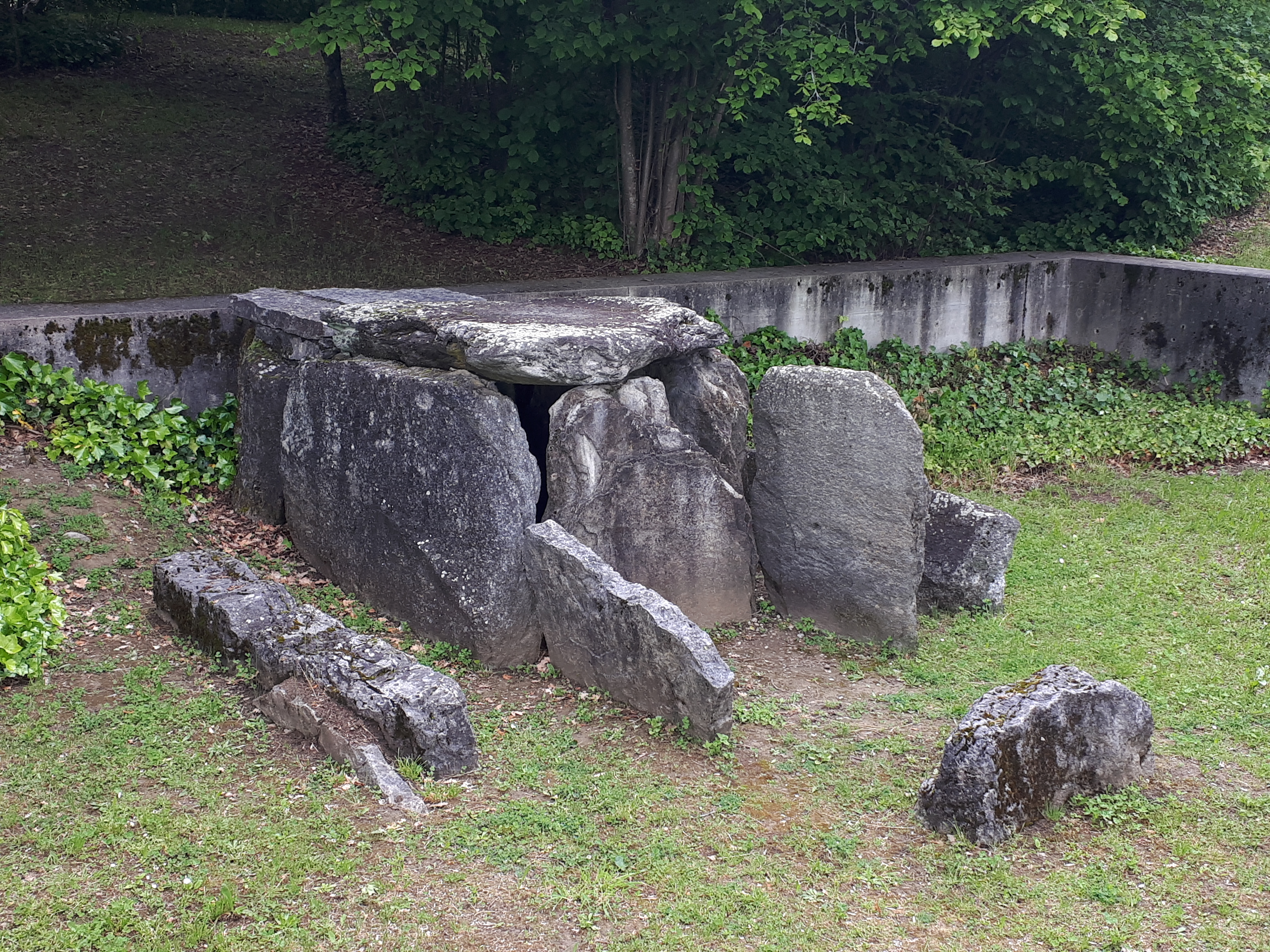

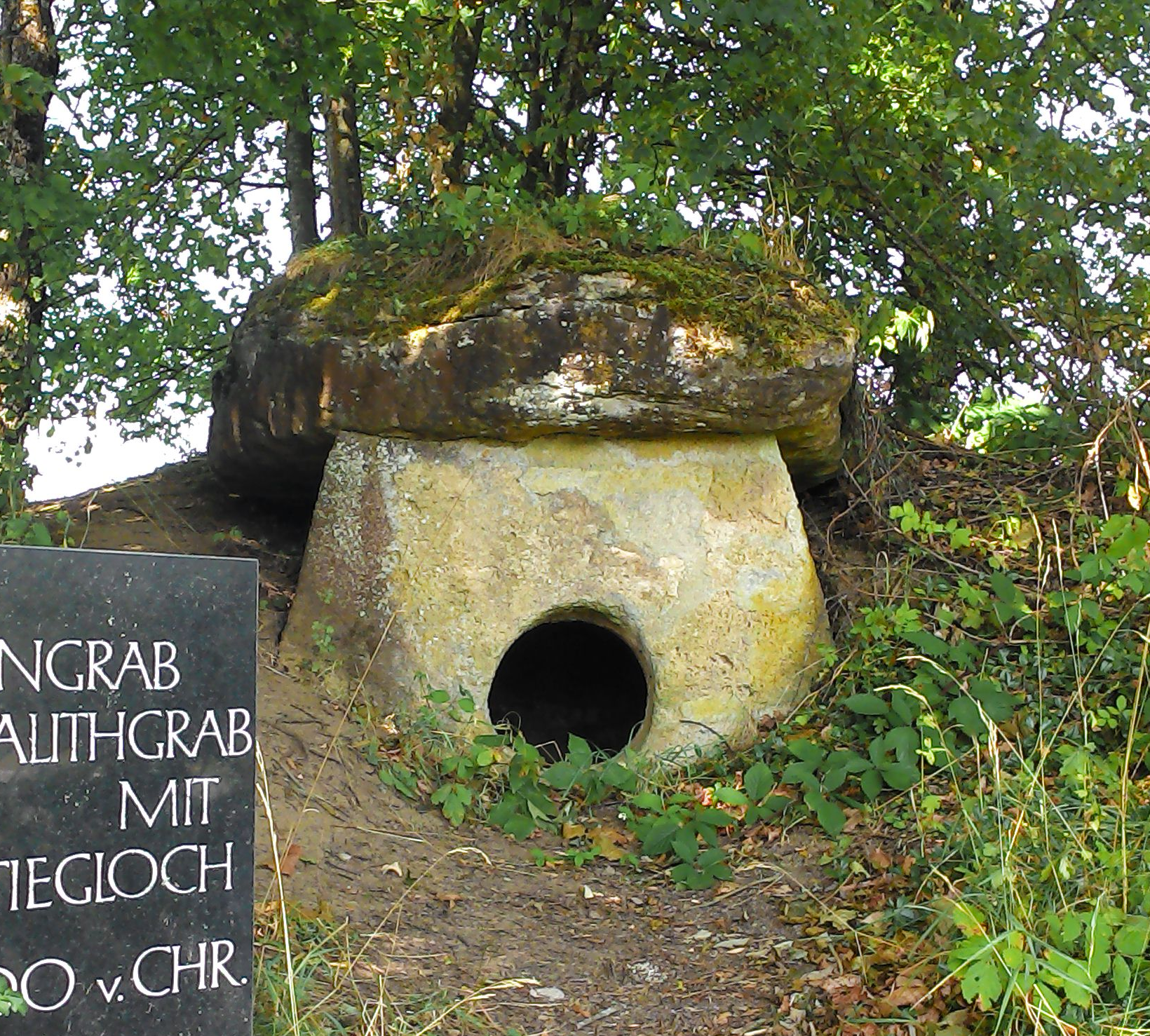

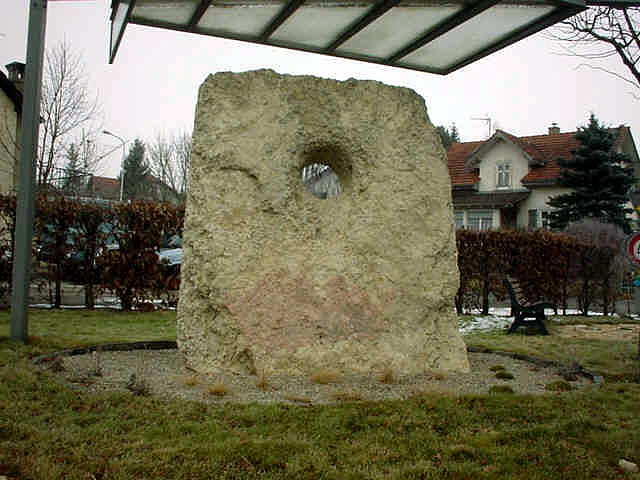

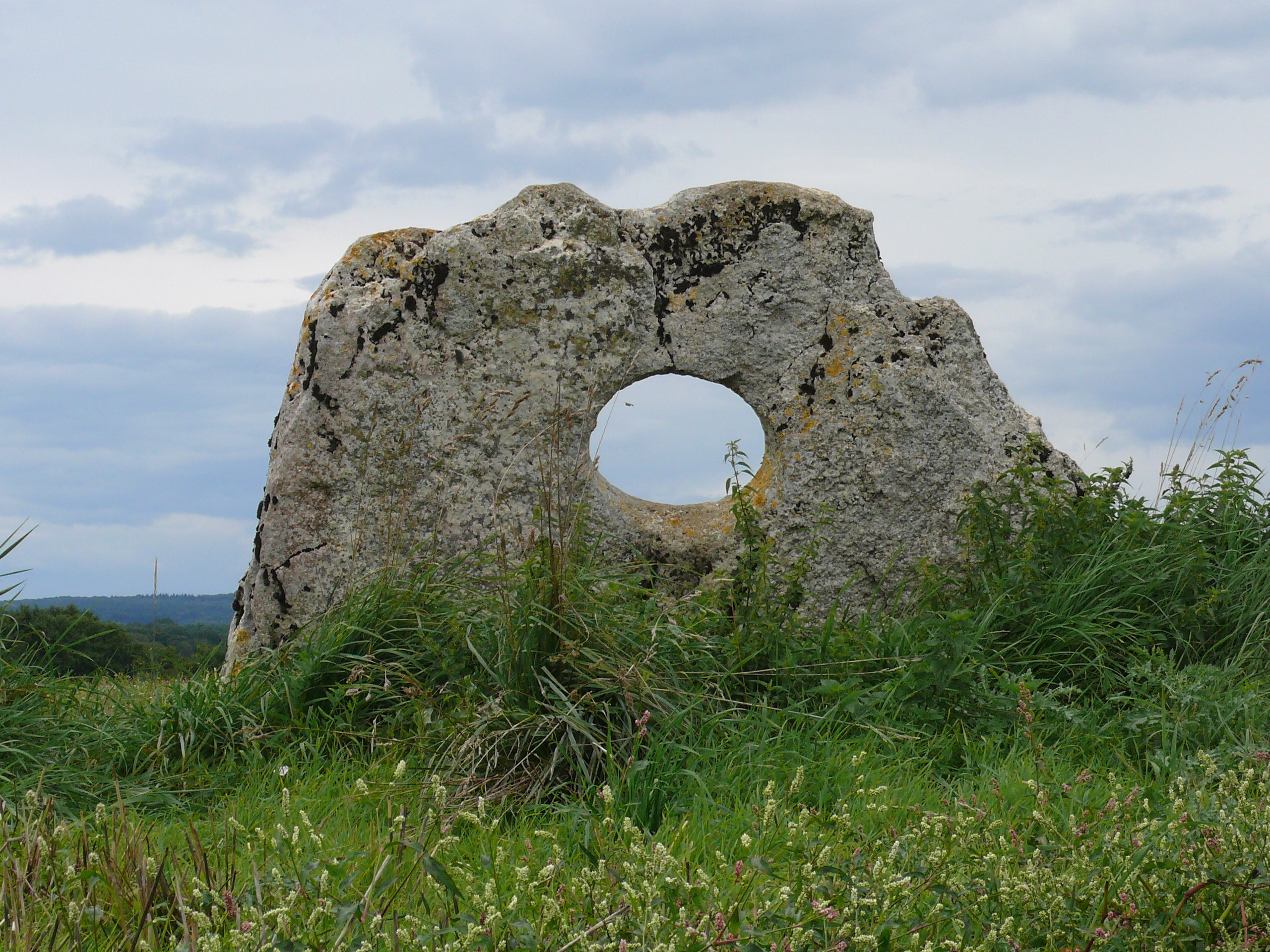

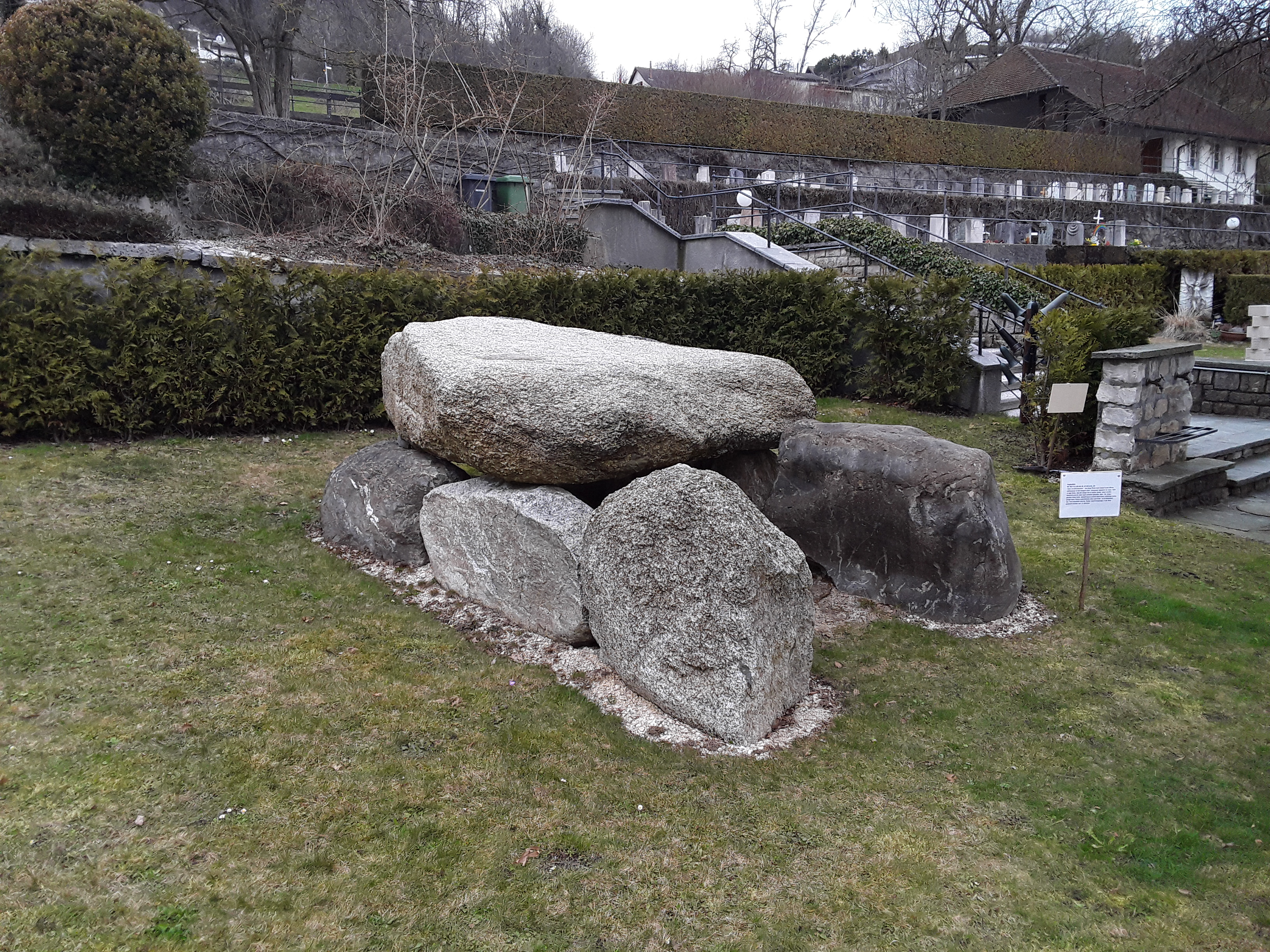
Oberbipp dolmen

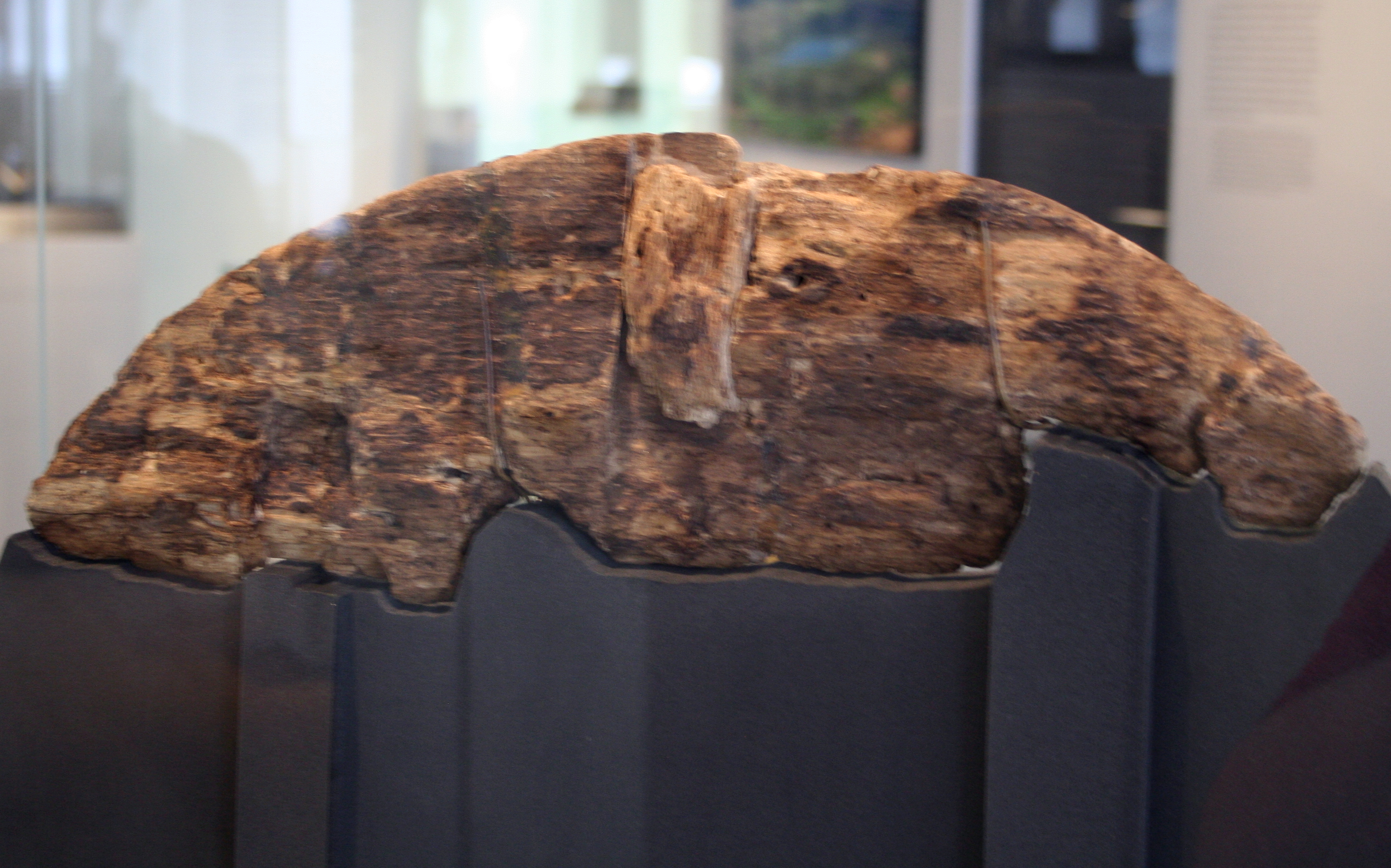
Wooden wheel fragment, c. 3000 BC

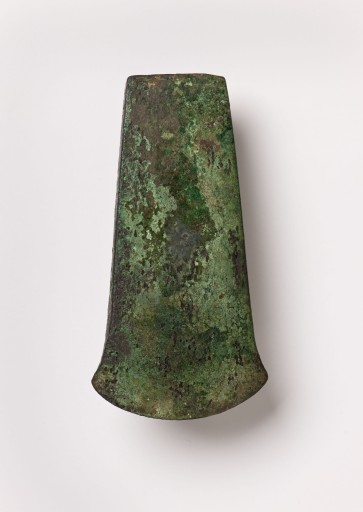
Alpine copper axe, 4th millennium BC

== See also ==
- Schwörstadt-type dolmen
- Prehistoric pile dwellings around the Alps
- Prehistoric pile dwellings around Lake Zurich
- Mondsee group
