= Pfyn culture =

Neolithic archaeological culture in Central Europe

- Geographical range: Southern Germany (Oberschwaben and southern Bavaria) and Switzerland near Lake Constance.
- Period: Neolithic, Chalcolithic
- Dates: 4,300–3,500 BC
- Characteristics: lake shore settlements pig domestication
- Preceded by: Rössen culture, Michelsberg culture
- Followed by: Horgen culture

The Pfyn Culture is one of several archaeological cultures of the Neolithic period in Switzerland. It dates from c. 4300 BC to c. 3500 BC.

== Discovery ==
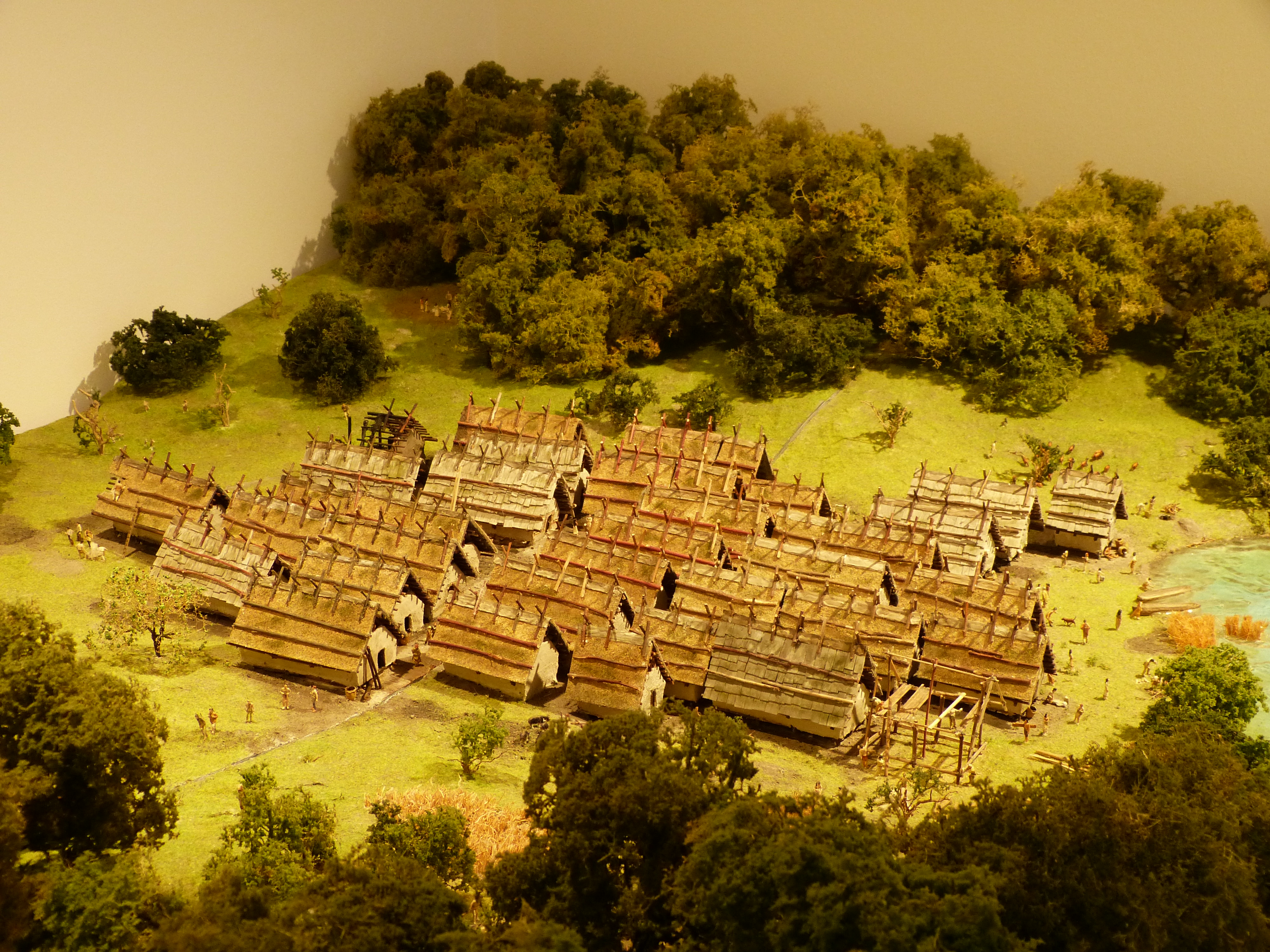
Pfyn-Breitenloo settlement, c. 3700 BC

The oldest traces of a settlement are about 1.5 km (0.93 mi) west of Pfyn in the former peat bog of Breitenloo. Located in a depression carved by a lateral moraine of the Thur glacier, it dates from the Neolithic era (4300 BC). The settlement site was discovered during peat cutting in the late 19th century but was subsequently forgotten. During the war years 1940–41, an attempt to drain the bog to increase arable production land led to its rediscovery. Drainage work on arable production was raised again. In the autumn of 1944, an area of approximately 1,000 square metres (11,000 sq ft) was excavated by interned Polish soldiers led by Charles Keller-Tarnuzzer. Due to the topographical conditions, and an exploratory drilling project in 2002, it appears that about 60% of the settlement area has been excavated.

During the 1944 excavation, 17 different houses were found. The houses are located along a north–south main street with the gables facing the street. The buildings are almost exclusively built with two naves and have lengths of 4–11 meters (13–36 ft) and widths from 3.5–5.5 meters (11–18 ft). It is striking that several houses of vastly different sizes lay side by side, suggesting perhaps larger homes with smaller farm buildings. The house floors were all built with complex support structures and overlying split boards, which were usually covered with clay. Midden heaps in the soil and partial scorch marks on the support structures suggest that at least some buildings were lifted quite high off the ground.

Keller-Tarnuzzer noted that there was a close relationship between the ceramics and the Michelsberg culture of southern Germany, and believed that the Pfyn finds were a Michelsberg settlement. Around 1960, research determined that the Pfyn ceramics represented an autonomous culture that was related to the Michelsberg culture. Since then, the Pfyn-Breitenloo site has been regarded as the center of the Pfyn culture. Further explorations in 2002 and 2004 led to a somewhat more nuanced picture of the settlement. This enabled the site to be dated via dendrochronology. The timbers used were cut between 3706-3704 BC. and confirm a single development phase. Another Neolithic settlement must have existed some 400 m (1,300 ft) northwest of Breitenloo. However, the few ceramics discovered at that site are also part of the Pfyn culture. The settlement has never been systematically studied, and it is believed that the industrial peat extraction during the second World War may have largely destroyed it.

== Economy ==
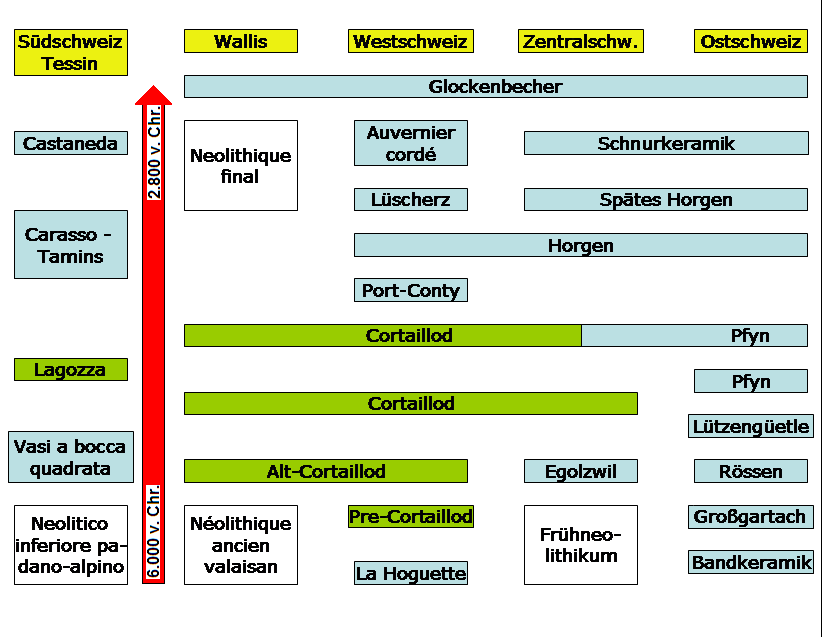
Dates and locations of prehistoric Swiss cultures

Some evidence of metal working has been found in the region between Lake Constance and Lake Zürich from about the time period of the Pfyn culture. Unfortunately, most of the metal comes from isolated finds and so is poorly dated. However, a copper wire and dagger from the Pfyn era were found at Reute in Appenzell Ausserrhoden as well as crucibles and casting spills.

Intensification of pig farming occurred during the Pfyn culture in the eastern part of the Alpine foreland. Keeping large numbers of pigs is typical of the Horgen and Corded Ware cultures. This 'pig economy' was exported westward by the Horgen culture.

Grain production was also very important. At the Pfyn era sites near Zurich, Durum wheat and Barley were most commonly found. About half of the total calories consumed by the Pfyn era people came from grain.

== Sites ==
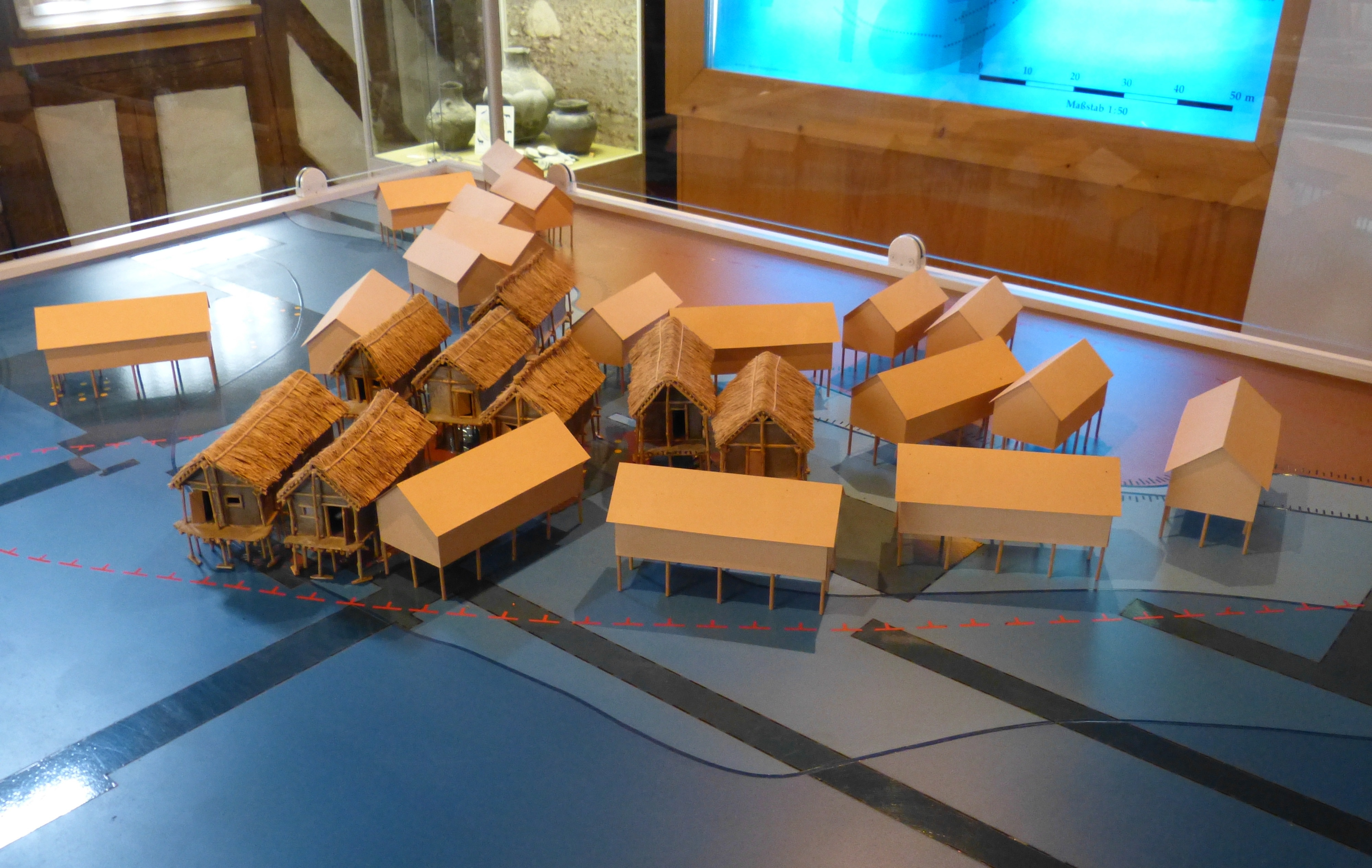
Hornstaad-Hörnle 1a, a lake settlement of the 'Hornstaad Group', c. 3900 BC.

Pfyn culture sites have been discovered in several locations in eastern Switzerland. These include:

- Breitenloo about 1.5 km (0.93 mi) from Pfyn in the canton of Thurgau along the Thur river.
- Feldmeilen-Vorderfeld and Meilen on the right bank of Lake Zurich. Four layers of Pfyn culture artifacts (4350-3950 BC calibrated) are followed by five Horgen culture layers were found at Feldmeilen. In Meilen, one Pfyn layer (4250-4000 BC) followed by three Horgen layers were discovered.

== Gallery ==
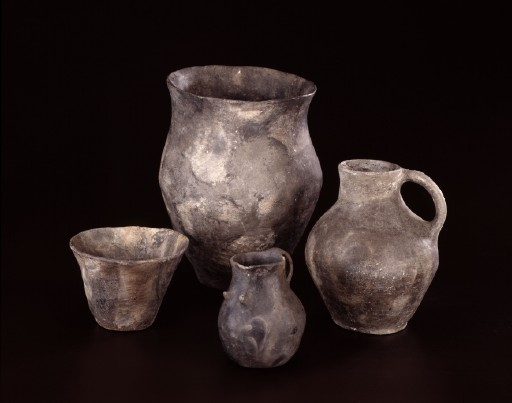
Ceramics, 4th millennium BC

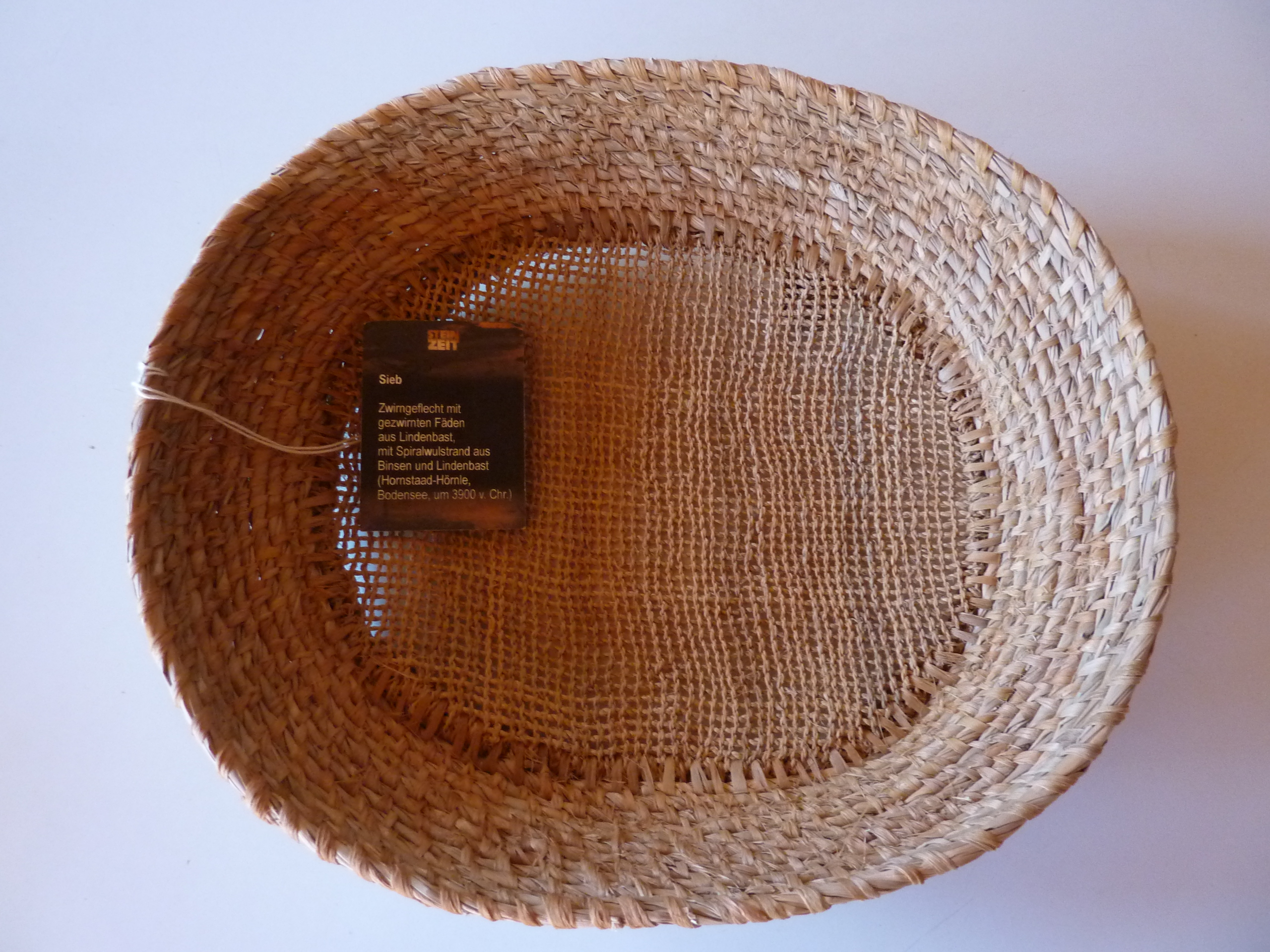
Reconstructed Neolithic sieve from Hornstaad-Hörnle, 3900 BC

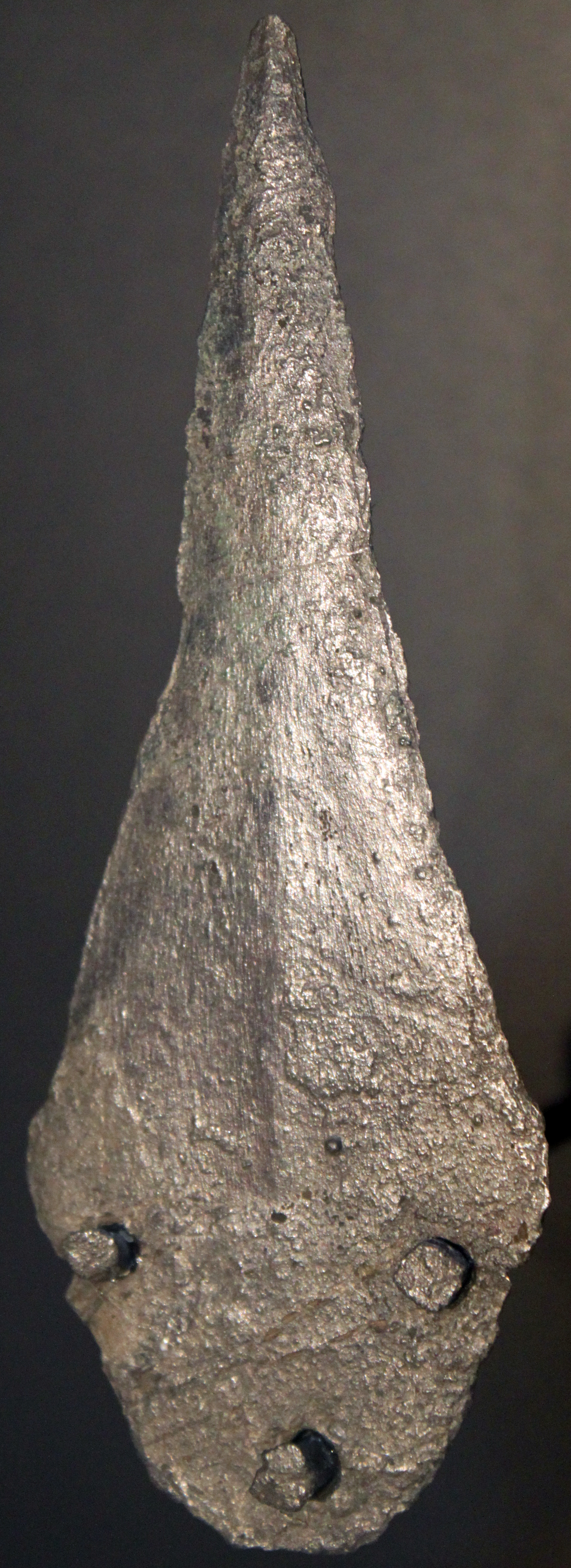
Arsenical Bronze dagger blade, c. 3,740 BC

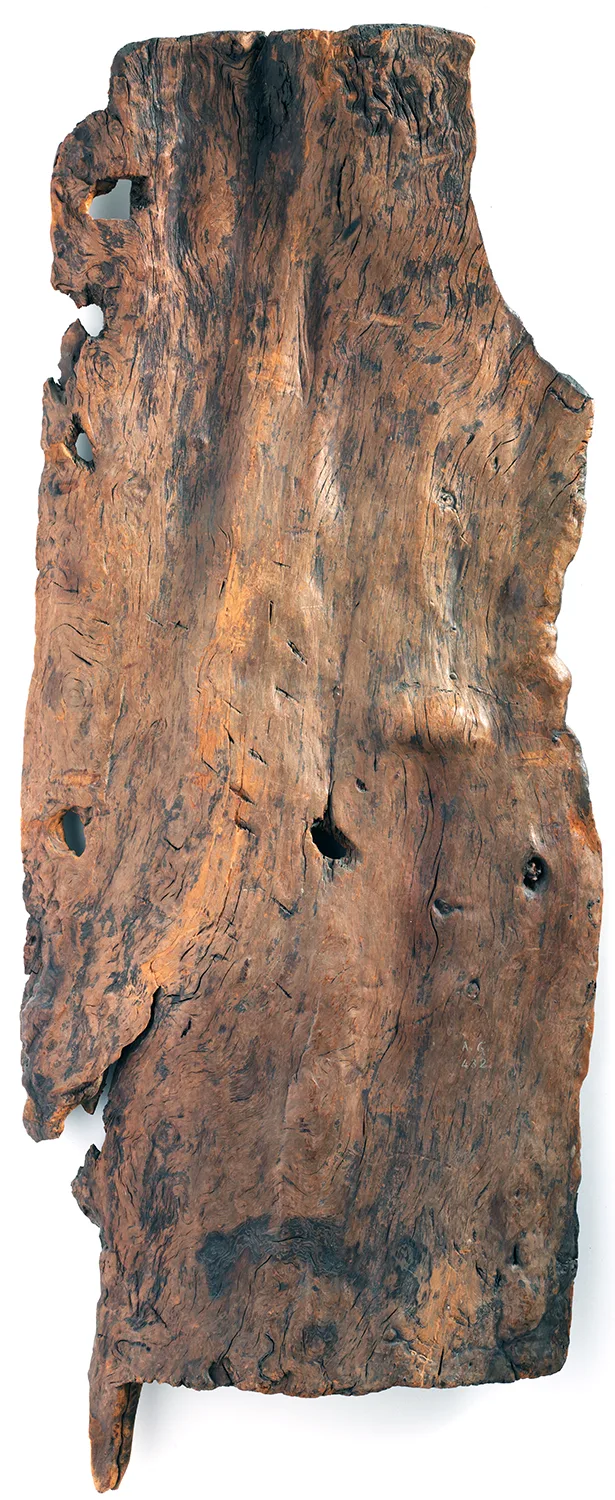
Wooden door from Robenhausen

== See also ==
- Prehistoric pile dwellings around the Alps
