= Lüscherz culture =

Neolithic archaeological culture in western Switzerland

- Period: Late Neolithic
- Dates: c. 3000–2700 BC
- Preceded by: Western Horgen culture
- Followed by: Auvernier / Auvernier-Cordé cultures

The Lüscherz culture (also Lüscherz civilization) is a Late Neolithic archaeological culture of western Switzerland, dated to shortly after 3000 BC until shortly before 2700 BC. It takes its name from the site of Lüscherz – Äussere Dorfstation, on the southern shore of Lake Bienne. Ceramics in this style were first uncovered there in 1878 during excavations by the physician Victor Gross. Depending on the region, the Lüscherz culture was succeeded by the Auvernier culture (2700–2400 BC) or the Auvernier-Cordé culture.

== Background and transition from Horgen ==
The transition from the Western Horgen culture to the Lüscherz culture is difficult to trace and interpret due to a gap of at least 100 years between the most recent Western Horgen finds (Douanne, upper Horgen layers, c. 3200–3175 BC) and the earliest Lüscherz finds (Boudry – Chézard, channel N1 of the Areuse delta), dated to c. 3100–3050 BC. Finds from before and after 3000 BC show notable differences, marking a particularly striking complete break in ceramic development. Influenced by cultures from the southwest, the Lüscherz culture is regarded by researchers as a regional group of the Saône-Rhône culture of eastern France.

== Material culture ==
=== Ceramics ===
As already observed in the Western Horgen culture, the formal repertoire of Lüscherz vessels consists mainly of barrel-shaped jars. After 3000 BC, their bases are exclusively rounded or flattened, in contrast to the preceding century when they were flat or raised. The vessels are also finer, with noticeably thinner walls, and display a slightly rounded or weakly inward-curving profile. They were decorated with small pellets, bosses, or plain cordons, generally placed below the rim rather than across the entire body. Comparable forms and decorations have been found in the Rhône valley and in the eastern French Jura, notably at Lac de Chalain.

=== Other artifacts ===
Large dagger blades in flint from Le Grand-Pressigny (Centre-Val de Loire), as well as bone pins and stone beads, find formal parallels with pieces uncovered in southern France. Perforated or ceremonial axes, sometimes fitted with double-edged stone blades, are also attested.

The characteristic "Lüscherz needles" are curved pins with a lateral loop, carved from a branch of deer antler. They are found mainly in the Three Lakes region and delimit the distribution zone of the Lüscherz culture, although some examples have been found at archaeological sites on the shores of Lake Geneva and Lake Zug.

== Regional variation ==
Compared to the forms and decorations of the Three Lakes region, ceramics from the site of Geneva – Parc La Grange — one of the few sites of this period on the shores of Lake Geneva — show a similar typology, but with noticeably thinner walls and numerous bowls with rounded bases, pointing to regional differences that remain difficult to define precisely.

== End of the culture ==
Shortly before 2700 BC, Corded Ware elements appear alongside the finds, marking the beginning of the succeeding Auvernier or Auvernier-Cordé culture.

== Bibliography ==
- Strahm, Christian: "Ausgrabungen in Vinelz 1960", in: Jahrbuch des Bernischen Historischen Museums, 45–46, 1965–1966, pp. 283–318.
- Magny, Michel; Schifferdecker, François: "Essai sur l'occupation du sol au Néolithique. Le groupe de Lüscherz", in: Bulletin de la Société préhistorique française, 77/1, 1980, pp. 17–25.
- Société suisse de préhistoire et d'archéologie (ed.): La Suisse du Paléolithique à l'aube du Moyen-Age. De l'homme de Néandertal à Charlemagne, vol. 2, 1995.
- Stöckli, Werner E.: Chronologie und Regionalität des jüngeren Neolithikums (4300–2400 v.Chr.) im Schweizer Mittelland, in Süddeutschland und in Ostfrankreich aufgrund der Keramik und der absoluten Datierungen, ausgehend von den Forschungen in den Feuchtbodensiedlungen der Schweiz, 2009.
- Stöckli, Werner E.: Urgeschichte der Schweiz im Überblick (15'000 v.Chr.–Christi Geburt). Die Konstruktion einer Urgeschichte, 2016.
- Suter, Peter J.; Affolter, Jehanne et al.: Um 2700 v.Chr. – Wandel und Kontinuität in den Ufersiedlungen am Bielersee, 2 vols., 2017.
