= Nuvilly =

- Municipality
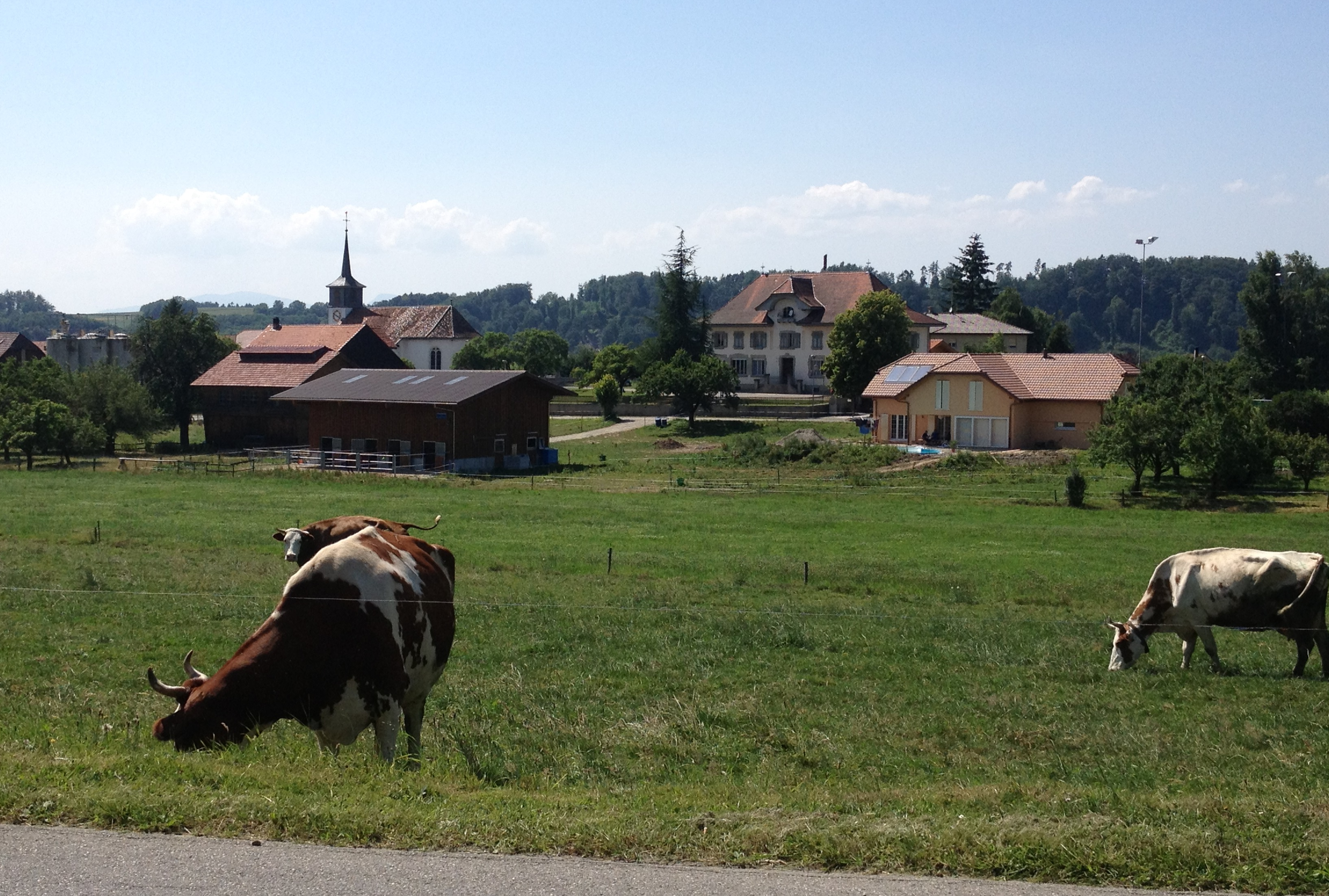

- Flag Coat of arms
- Location of Nuvilly
- Location within Switzerland Location within Canton of Fribourg
- Coordinates: 46°47′N 6°50′E
- Country: Switzerland
- Canton: Fribourg
- District: Broye

Government
  - Mayor: Syndic

Area
  - Total: 3.97 km^{2} (1.53 sq mi)
- Elevation: 629 m (2,064 ft)

Population (December 2020)
  - Total: 471
  - Density: 119/km^{2} (307/sq mi)
- Time zone: UTC+01:00 (CET)
  - Summer (DST): UTC+02:00 (CEST)
- Postal code: 1485
- SFOS number: 2035
- ISO 3166 code: CH-FR
- Surrounded by: Combremont-le-Grand (VD), Les Montets, Murist, Sassel (VD), Treytorrens (Payerne) (VD)
- Website: https://www.nuvilly.ch SFSO statistics

Nuvilly (Arpitan: Nôvelyi [nyviˈji]) is a municipality in the district of Broye, in the canton of Fribourg, Switzerland.

== History ==
Nuvilly is first mentioned in 1242 as Nuovillie.

== Geography ==
Nuvilly has an area, as of 2009, of 4 square kilometers (1.5 mi^{2}). Of this area, 2.96 km^{2} (1.14 mi^{2}) or 74.0% is used for agricultural purposes, while 0.72 km^{2} (0.28 mi^{2}) or 18.0% is forested. Of the rest of the land, 0.29 km^{2} (0.11 mi^{2}) or 7.3% is settled (buildings or roads).

Of the built up area, housing and buildings made up 4.0% and transportation infrastructure made up 3.0%. Out of the forested land, 16.0% of the total land area is heavily forested and 2.0% is covered with orchards or small clusters of trees. Of the agricultural land, 55.0% is used for growing crops and 17.8% is pastures, while 1.3% is used for orchards or vine crops.

The municipality is located in the Broye district, in the southernmost part of the Estavayer-le-Lac exclave and the Broye valley.

The municipalities of Châbles, Cheyres, Murist, Nuvilly and Vuissens are considering a merger on at a date in the future into the new municipality with an, as of 2011, undetermined name.

== Coat of arms ==
The blazon of the municipal coat of arms is Pally of Six Argent and Azure overall on a Bend Gules three Mullets of Five.

== Demographics ==
Nuvilly has a population (as of December 2020) of 471. As of 2008, 2.1% of the population are resident foreign nationals. Over the last 10 years (2000–2010) the population has changed at a rate of 14.4%. Migration accounted for 17%, while births and deaths accounted for 0.3%.

Most of the population (as of 2000) speaks French (280 or 95.2%) as their first language, German is the second most common (10 or 3.4%) and Portuguese is the third (2 or 0.7%).

As of 2008, the population was 48.8% male and 51.2% female. The population was made up of 164 Swiss men (47.4% of the population) and 5 (1.4%) non-Swiss men. There were 167 Swiss women (48.3%) and 10 (2.9%) non-Swiss women. Of the population in the municipality, 150 or about 51.0% were born in Nuvilly and lived there in 2000. There were 60 or 20.4% who were born in the same canton, while 62 or 21.1% were born somewhere else in Switzerland, and 18 or 6.1% were born outside of Switzerland.

The age distribution, as of 2000, in Nuvilly is; 46 children or 15.6% of the population are between 0 and 9 years old and 35 teenagers or 11.9% are between 10 and 19. Of the adult population, 23 people or 7.8% of the population are between 20 and 29 years old. 56 people or 19.0% are between 30 and 39, 37 people or 12.6% are between 40 and 49, and 42 people or 14.3% are between 50 and 59. The senior population distribution is 25 people or 8.5% of the population are between 60 and 69 years old, 16 people or 5.4% are between 70 and 79, there are 13 people or 4.4% who are between 80 and 89, and there is 1 person who is 90 and older.

As of 2000, there were 119 people who were single and never married in the municipality. There were 140 married individuals, 20 widows or widowers and 15 individuals who are divorced.

As of 2000, there were 114 private households in the municipality, and an average of 2.6 persons per household. There were 28 households that consist of only one person and 11 households with five or more people. In 2000, a total of 114 apartments (88.4% of the total) were permanently occupied, while 5 apartments (3.9%) were seasonally occupied and 10 apartments (7.8%) were empty. As of 2009, the construction rate of new housing units was 8.6 new units per 1000 residents.

The historical population is given in the following chart:

== Politics ==
In the 2011 federal election the most popular party was the CVP which received 26.3% of the vote. The next three most popular parties were the SP (23.7%), the SVP (22.4%) and the FDP (13.5%).

The CVP received about the same percentage of the vote as they did in the 2007 Federal election (31.0% in 2007 vs 26.3% in 2011). The SPS retained about the same popularity (24.7% in 2007), the SVP moved from fourth in 2007 (with 17.9%) to third and the FDP moved from third in 2007 (with 19.2%) to fourth. A total of 127 votes were cast in this election, of which 3 or 2.4% were invalid.

== Economy ==
As of 2010, Nuvilly had an unemployment rate of 3.4%. As of 2008, there were 31 people employed in the primary economic sector and about 11 businesses involved in this sector. 11 people were employed in the secondary sector and there were 4 businesses in this sector. 19 people were employed in the tertiary sector, with 13 businesses in this sector. There were 143 residents of the municipality who were employed in some capacity, of which females made up 42.7% of the workforce.

In 2008 the total number of full-time equivalent jobs was 50. The number of jobs in the primary sector was 23, all of which were in agriculture. The number of jobs in the secondary sector was 9, all of which were in construction. The number of jobs in the tertiary sector was 18. In the tertiary sector; 2 or 11.1% were in wholesale or retail sales or the repair of motor vehicles, 1 was in the movement and storage of goods, 2 or 11.1% were in a hotel or restaurant, 1 was in the information industry, 1 was the insurance or financial industry, 4 or 22.2% were technical professionals or scientists, 4 or 22.2% were in education and 1 was in health care.

TheIn 2000, there were 8 workers who commuted into the municipality and 107 workers who commuted away. The municipality is a net exporter of workers, with about 13.4 workers leaving the municipality for every one entering. Of the working population, 6.3% used public transportation to get to work, and 69.9% used a private car.

As of the rest of the Broye, Nuvilly produces tobacco and sugar beet. More recently and due to the bio-carburant needs, the rapeseed production increased. The lessening of the Federal subvention on milk caused the bovine cattle to decrease in favor of other more remunerating activities (such as the pork and veal breeding for meat purpose).

== Religion ==
From the 2000 census, 226 or 76.9% were Roman Catholic, while 34 or 11.6% belonged to the Swiss Reformed Church. Of the rest of the population, there was 1 individual who belongs to another Christian church. There were 5 (or about 1.70% of the population) who were Islamic. There were 1 individual who belonged to another church. 16 (or about 5.44% of the population) belonged to no church, are agnostic or atheist, and 11 individuals (or about 3.74% of the population) did not answer the question.

== Education ==
In Nuvilly about 99 or (33.7%) of the population have completed non-mandatory upper secondary education, and 27 or (9.2%) have completed additional higher education (either university or a Fachhochschule). Of the 27 who completed tertiary schooling, 40.7% were Swiss men, 48.1% were Swiss women.

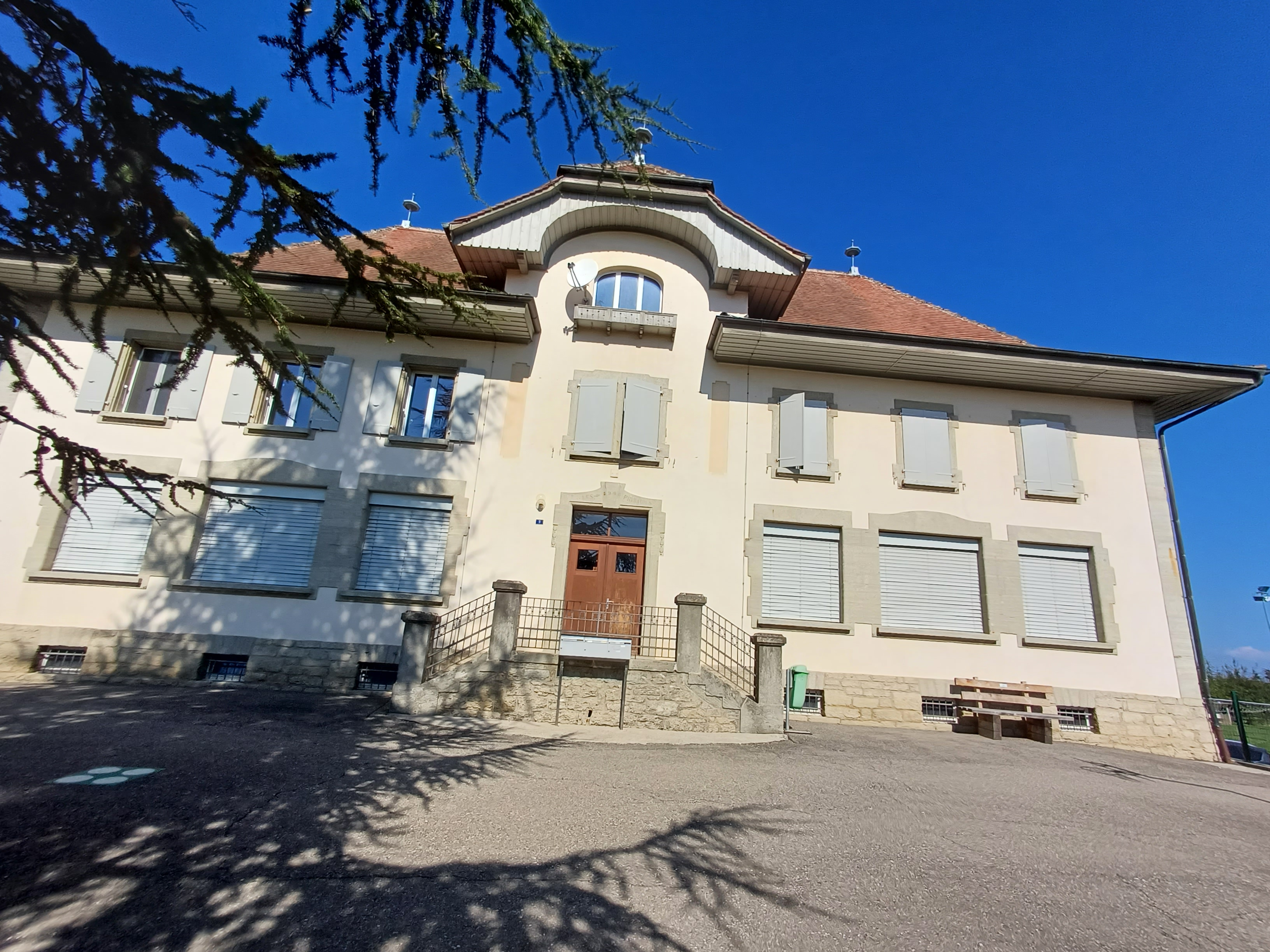
School of Nuvilly

In the canton of Fribourg, compulsory education is divided into three cycles. Nuvilly is part of the cercle scolaire Les Montets / Nuvilly, which includes the localities of Aumont, Frasses, Granges de Vesin, Les Montets and Nuvilly. Only education for cycles 1 and 2 is provided in this cercle scolaire. As from 9th year (separation of students according to ability and aptitude), students must be schooled elsewhere.

During the 2010–11 school year, there were a total of 43 students attending 2 classes in Nuvilly. A total of 71 students from the municipality attended any school, either in the municipality or outside of it. There were no kindergarten classes in the municipality, but 7 students attended kindergarten in a neighboring municipality. The municipality had 2 primary classes and 43 students. During the same year, there were no lower secondary classes in the municipality, but 22 students attended lower secondary school in a neighboring municipality. There were no upper Secondary classes or vocational classes, but there was one upper Secondary student and 6 upper Secondary vocational students who attended classes in another municipality. The municipality had no non-university Tertiary classes. who attended classes in another municipality.

As of 2000, there were 21 students in Nuvilly who came from another municipality, while 35 residents attended schools outside the municipality.

The pupils are geographically distributed among the localities of Aumont (two classes of 1H et 2H in 2023-2024), Nuvilly (three classes of 3H and 4H) et Les Montets (five classes from 5H to 8H).

== Climate ==
As the rest of Switzerland, Nuvilly has a tempered climate. Due to the bowl form and the humidity of all the Broye area, from the middle of September to the end of April, Nuvilly is regularly hidden by a dense cloak of fog.

== Tourism ==
With its country roads and small path, Nuvilly is often considered a good place for hiking trails and nature sightseeing.

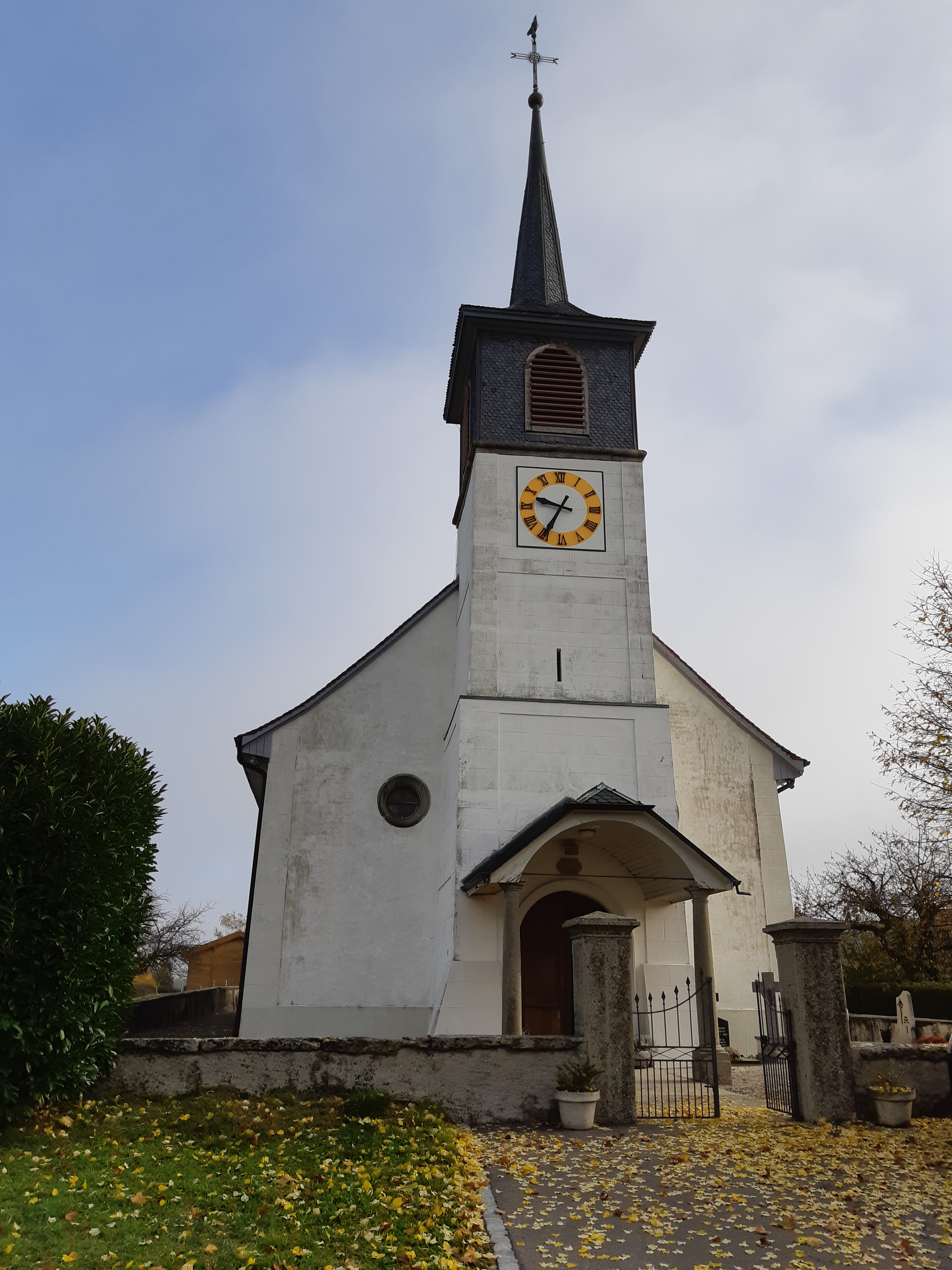
Church of Nuvilly

The catholic church of Nuvilly, consecrated in 1690, in baroque style, is one of the cultural sites of significance of the village.

This church is under the patronage of James the Great.

The church was renewed between 2006 and 2007 and is well preserved. Visitors would be able to admire stained glass windows including one of Joseph and one of Bernadette, as well as a triptych on both sides of the choir and on its anterior part. The church is a good example of the local architecture.
