= Montet (disambiguation) =

Montet is a former municipality in the district of Glâne in the canton of Fribourg in Switzerland.

Montet may also refer to:

== Places ==
- Le Montet, a commune in the Allier department in Auvergne in central France
- Montet, Broye, a former municipality in the district of Broye, in the canton of Fribourg, Switzerland
- Les Montets, a municipality in the district of Broye, in the canton of Fribourg, Switzerland

== People ==
- Numa F. Montet (1892–1985), US Representative from Louisiana
- Pierre Montet (1885–1966), French Egyptologist
