= Aumont, Fribourg =

Former municipality, canton of Fribourg

Aumont
- Former municipality
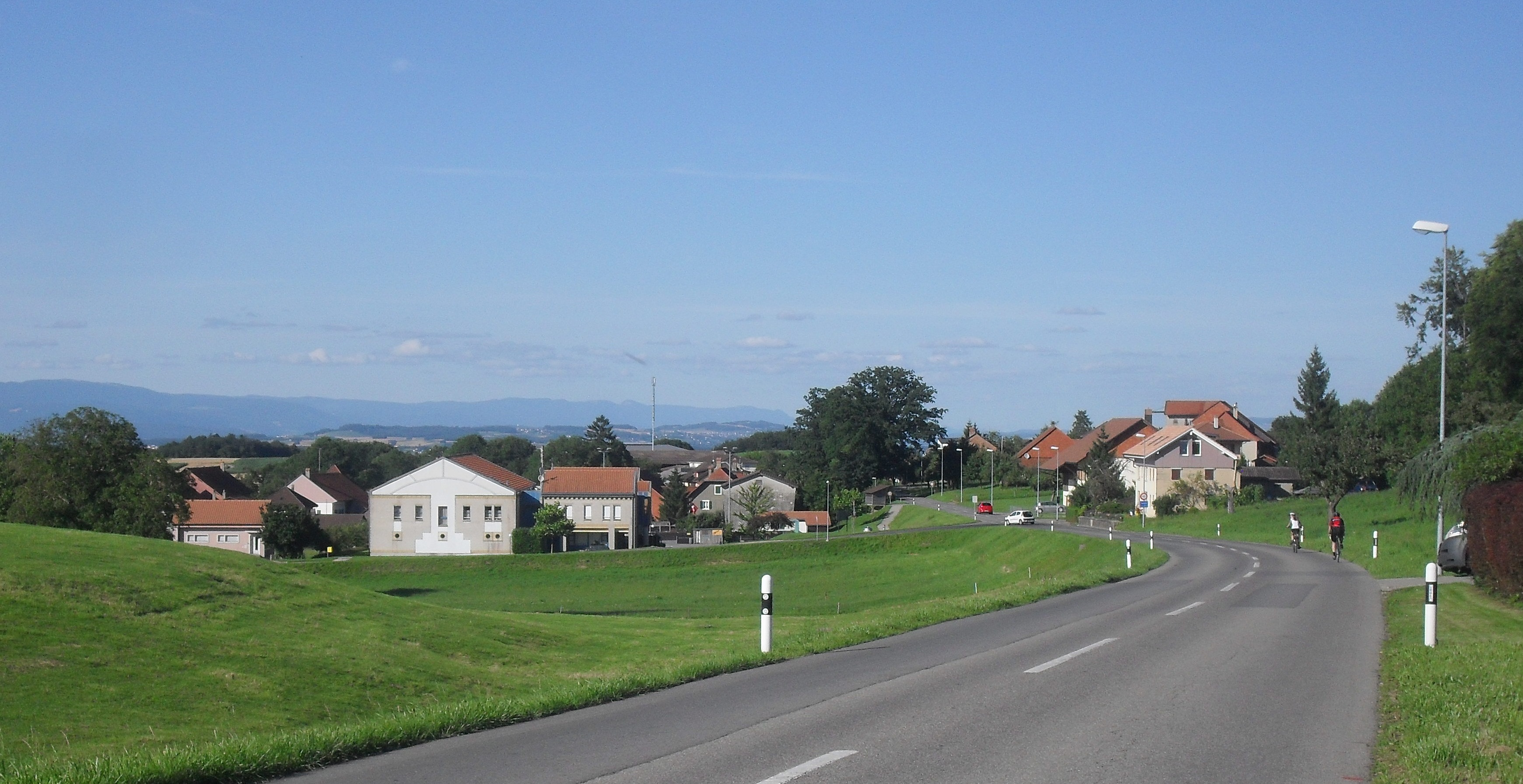
- View of Aumont

- Coat of arms
- Location of Aumont
- Location within Switzerland Location within Canton of Fribourg
- Coordinates: 46.8°N 6.850004°E
- Country: Switzerland
- Canton: Fribourg
- District: Broye
- Municipality: Les Montets

Population (2000)
  - Total: 393
- Time zone: UTC+01:00 (CET)
  - Summer (DST): UTC+02:00 (CEST)
- ISO 3166 code: CH-FR
- Website

Aumont is a former municipality in the Broye district of the canton of Fribourg, Switzerland. In 2004 it merged with Frasses, Granges-de-Vesin and Montet (Broye) to form the municipality of Les Montets.

== History ==
Aumont is first mentioned shortly after 1157 as Alto Monte. Five tumuli from the La Tène period, with jewelry, have been found there.

From the 14th century the lordship of Aumont came under the jurisdiction of Estavayer. In 1321 Conon d'Estavayer sold half of the lands of Aumont to the church of Saint-Laurent in Estavayer. After the middle of the 17th century the lordship passed through various hands by inheritance. From 1536 Aumont belonged to the bailiwick of Estavayer, and from 1798 to 1848 to the district of the same name. In 1804 the village of Granges-de-Vesin separated from the municipality.

In church matters, Aumont and Nuvilly separated from Cugy in 1586 to form their own parish; in 1878 Aumont was finally made a parish, together with Granges-de-Vesin. The chapel of Saint-Théodule, mentioned in 1442, was rebuilt from 1824 to 1826. The school building of 1798 also served Granges-de-Vesin until 1834.

Cereals and fodder crops are grown and cattle are raised. The number of commuters increased at the end of the 20th century. Aumont had 270 inhabitants in 1811, 442 in 1850, 490 in 1900, 392 in 1950, 326 in 1980 and 393 in 2000. In 2004 it merged with Frasses, Granges-de-Vesin and Montet (Broye) to form Les Montets.

== Bibliography ==
- A. Dellion, Dictionnaire historique et statistique des paroisses catholiques du canton de Fribourg, vol. 1, pp. 211–228
