= Frasses =

Former municipality, canton of Fribourg

- Former municipality
- Frasses

- Coat of arms
- Location of Frasses
- Location within Switzerland Location within Canton of Fribourg
- Coordinates: 46.833342°N 6.866667°E
- Country: Switzerland
- Canton: Fribourg
- District: Broye
- Municipality: Les Montets

Population (2000)
  - Total: 154
- Time zone: UTC+01:00 (CET)
  - Summer (DST): UTC+02:00 (CEST)
- ISO 3166 code: CH-FR
- Website

Frasses is a former municipality in the Broye district of the canton of Fribourg, Switzerland. In 2004 it merged with Aumont, Granges-de-Vesin and Montet (Broye) to form the municipality of Les Montets.

== History ==
Frasses is first mentioned in 1142 as Fraces. Archaeological remains include traces of Bronze Age, Iron Age and Roman settlement, a La Tène cemetery and a Roman cremation grave.

Frasses was part of the lordship of Estavayer-Montet, whose rights were divided in 1519 between Philippe d'Estavayer, the Duke of Savoy and Fribourg. The tithe belonged to the majors (local officials) of Cugy in the 14th century and from 1389 to Girard de Moudon, a burgher of Montagny; in 1525 Guillaume and Louis de Gruyères-Aigremont held half of it. From 1536 the village belonged to the bailiwick of Estavayer, and from 1798 to 1848 to the district of the same name. In church matters, Frasses came under the parishes of Cugy, of Morens-Bussy (1676) and, from 1701, of Montet (Broye).

The railway line from Payerne to Estavayer-le-Lac dates from 1878. Land consolidation took place in 1968 and 1991, and land improvements in 1994. Cereals and fodder crops are grown. Since 2001 the A1 motorway has crossed the territory of Frasses.

Frasses had 94 inhabitants in 1811, 123 in 1850, 122 in 1900, 115 in 1950, 95 in 1970 and 154 in 2000. In 2004 it merged with Aumont, Granges-de-Vesin and Montet (Broye) to form Les Montets.
