= Montet, Broye =

Former municipality, canton of Fribourg

Montet
- Former municipality
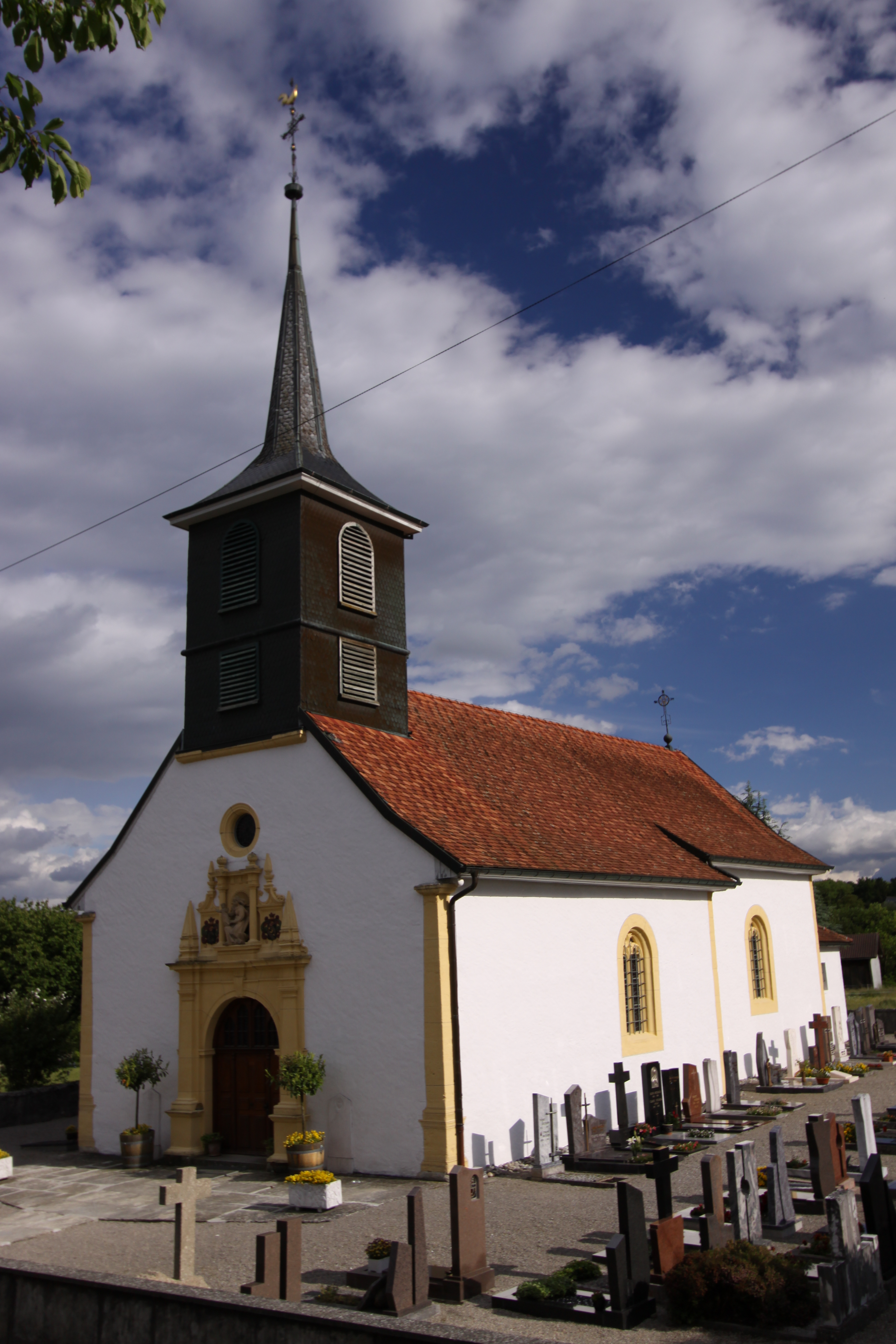
- Church of the Holy Trinity

- Coat of arms
- Location of Montet
- Location within Switzerland Location within Canton of Fribourg
- Coordinates: 46.816673°N 6.866673°E
- Country: Switzerland
- Canton: Fribourg
- District: Broye
- Municipality: Les Montets

Population (2000)
  - Total: 410
- Time zone: UTC+01:00 (CET)
  - Summer (DST): UTC+02:00 (CEST)
- ISO 3166 code: CH-FR
- Website

Montet is a former municipality in the Broye district of the canton of Fribourg, Switzerland. In 2004 it merged with Aumont, Frasses and Granges-de-Vesin to form the municipality of Les Montets.

== History ==
Montet is first mentioned in 1274 as Montez. In the Middle Ages it came under the lordship of Estavayer; it then belonged to the bailiwick of Estavayer (1536–1798) and to the district of Estavayer-le-Lac (1798–1848). Before the Battle of Morat in 1476, Charles the Bold set up his military camp at Montet. In the 17th century Montet was owned by the Lanthen-Heid family, and then by the Praroman family until the end of the 18th century.

In church matters, Montet separated from Cugy in 1675 and, at the request of Anne Marie Lanthen-Heid, formed a parish, together with Frasses from 1701 to 1901 and with Seiry from 1734 to 1900. The church of the Holy Trinity (Sainte-Trinité; 1660–1663, restored in 1996–1998) has remarkable Baroque altarpieces. Montet Castle housed a community of the Society of the Sacred Heart (1831–1847), the orphanage of the Marini Institute (1882–1961), a secondary school run by the Salvatorians (1961–1978) and then the meeting and training center of the Focolare Movement (1981–2024).

In 2000 Montet had six farms (livestock and crops). The nearby A1 motorway (2001) brought residential development. Montet had 184 inhabitants in 1811, 261 in 1850, 397 in 1900, 386 in 1950 and 410 in 2000. In 2004 it merged with Aumont, Frasses and Granges-de-Vesin to form Les Montets.

== Bibliography ==
- A. Dellion, Dictionnaire historique et statistique des paroisses catholiques du canton de Fribourg, vol. 8, 1896, pp. 484–505
- Helvetia Sacra, VIII/2, 1998, pp. 575–588
- J. Bondallaz, Histoire du village de Montet, 1998
