= Vesin =

Former municipality, canton of Fribourg

- Former municipality
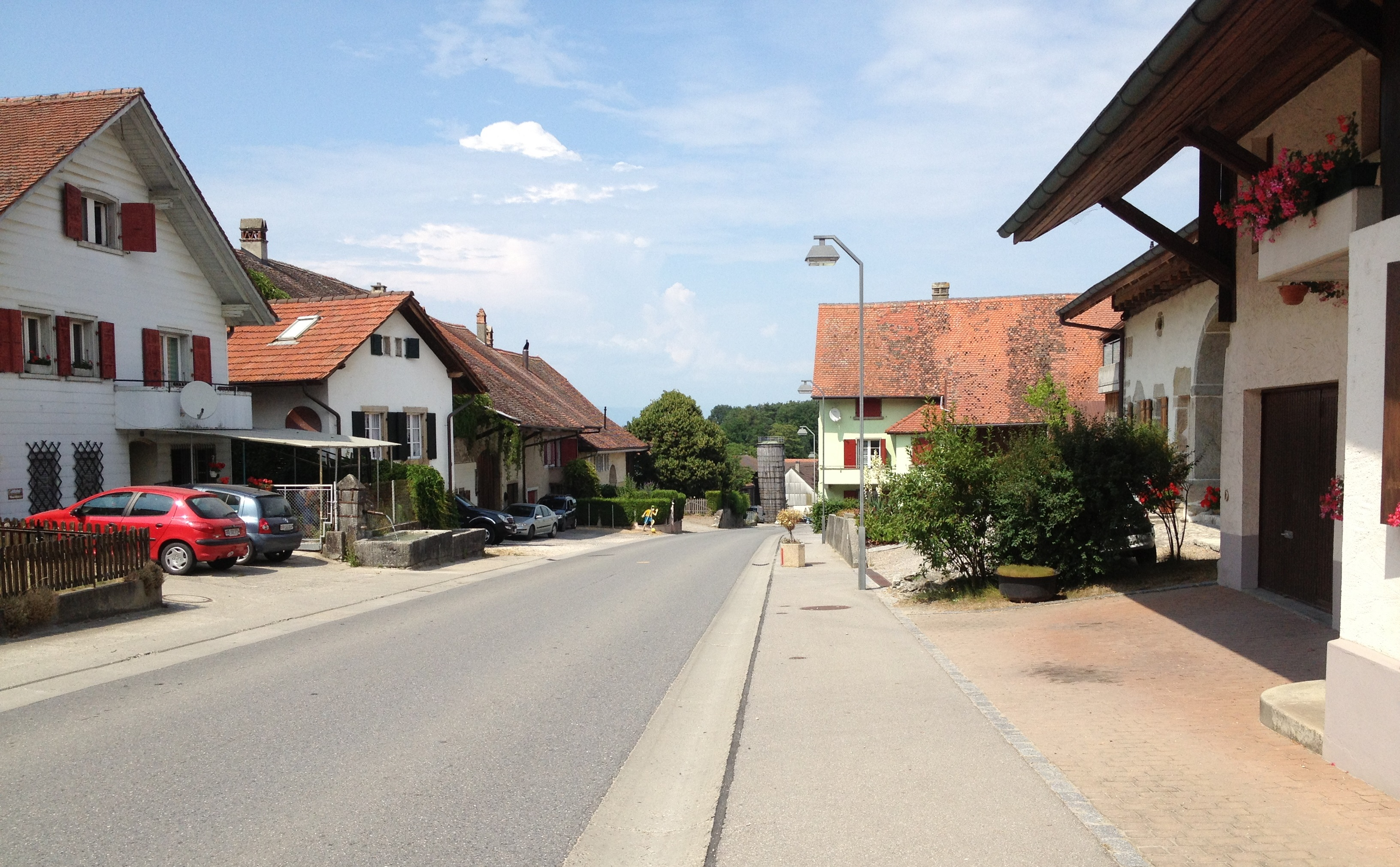
- Vesin

- Coat of arms
- Location of Vesin
- Location within Switzerland Location within Canton of Fribourg
- Coordinates: 46.800004°N 6.866667°E
- Country: Switzerland
- Canton: Fribourg
- District: Broye
- Municipality: Cugy

Population (2000)
  - Total: 242
- Time zone: UTC+01:00 (CET)
  - Summer (DST): UTC+02:00 (CEST)
- ISO 3166 code: CH-FR
- Website

Vesin is a former municipality in the Broye district of the canton of Fribourg, Switzerland, in the enclave of Estavayer-le-Lac. Since 2005 it has been part of the municipality of Cugy.

== History ==
Vesin is first mentioned in 1223 as Visins. It was part of the lordship of Cugy. In 1338 it was burned by the people of Payerne. From 1536 Vesin belonged to the bailiwick of Estavayer, and from 1798 to 1848 to the district of the same name. In church matters, it has likewise always belonged to the parish of Cugy.

Vesin is an agricultural village (livestock farming, cereals, maize and tobacco). Since 1919 it has been the seat of the Broye seed growers' cooperative (Syndicat des sélectionneurs de la Broye; bread and fodder cereals), which supplies seed crops to several cantons. A ready-mixed concrete company and gravel pits date from 1969.

Vesin had 142 inhabitants in 1811, 214 in 1850, 259 in 1900, 250 in 1950, 175 in 1980 and 242 in 2000. In 2005 it became part of Cugy.

== Bibliography ==
- Journal d'Estavayer, 27 September 1966
- Fribourg illustré, 1992, no. 1, pp. 11–15
