= Sévaz =

- Municipality
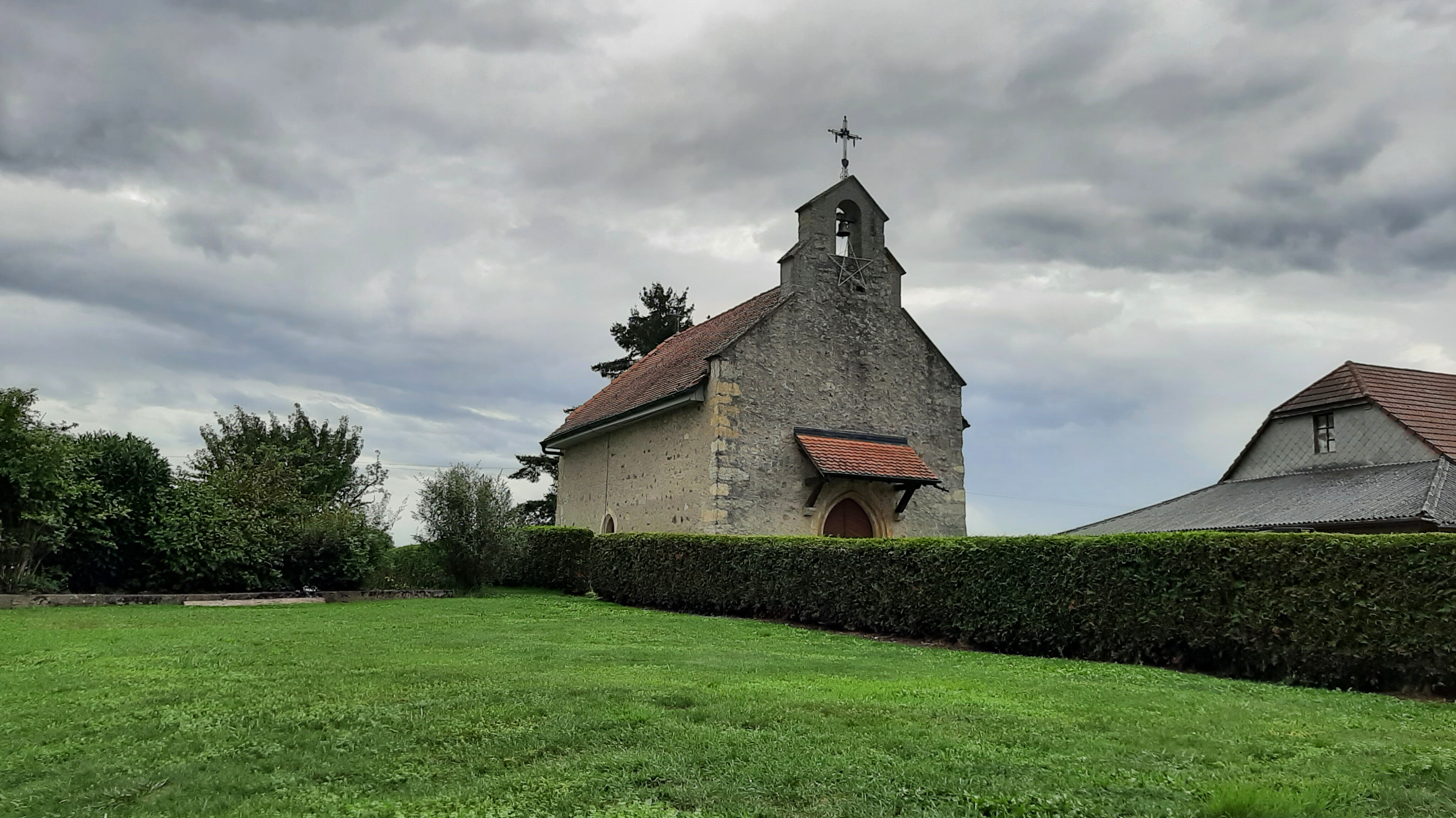

- Flag Coat of arms
- Location of Sévaz
- Location within Switzerland Location within Canton of Fribourg
- Coordinates: 46°50′N 6°52′E
- Country: Switzerland
- Canton: Fribourg
- District: Broye

Government
  - Mayor: Syndic

Area
  - Total: 2.46 km^{2} (0.95 sq mi)
- Elevation: 492 m (1,614 ft)

Population (December 2020)
  - Total: 318
  - Density: 129/km^{2} (335/sq mi)
- Time zone: UTC+01:00 (CET)
  - Summer (DST): UTC+02:00 (CEST)
- Postal code: 1541
- SFOS number: 2043
- ISO 3166 code: CH-FR
- Surrounded by: Bussy, Estavayer-le-Lac, Les Montets, Montbrelloz
- Website: sevaz.ch

Sévaz (Arpitan: Siva, locally Chiva) is a municipality in the district of Broye, in the canton of Fribourg, Switzerland.

== History ==
Sévaz is first mentioned in 1056 as Silva.

== Geography ==
Sévaz has an area, as of 2009, of 2.5 square kilometers (0.97 mi^{2}). Of this area, 2.15 km^{2} (0.83 mi^{2}) or 86.0% is used for agricultural purposes, while 0.05 km^{2} (0.019 mi^{2}) or 2.0% is forested. Of the rest of the land, 0.22 km^{2} (0.085 mi^{2}) or 8.8% is settled (buildings or roads), 0.01 km^{2} (2.5 acres) or 0.4% is either rivers or lakes and 0.04 km^{2} (9.9 acres) or 1.6% is unproductive land.

Of the built up area, industrial buildings made up 2.4% of the total area while housing and buildings made up 2.0% and transportation infrastructure made up 3.2%. Power and water infrastructure as well as other special developed areas made up 1.2% of the area Out of the forested land, all of the forested land area is covered with heavy forests. Of the agricultural land, 74.4% is used for growing crops and 10.8% is pastures. All the water in the municipality is in lakes.

The municipality is located in the Broye district, in the Estavayer-le-Lac exclave.

== Coat of arms ==
The blazon of the municipal coat of arms is Azure, issuant from two Mounts as many Columns Argent and on a Chief of the same three Roses Gules barbed and seeded proper.

== Demographics ==
Sévaz has a population (as of December 2020) of 318. As of 2008, 17.6% of the population are resident foreign nationals. From 2000–2010 the population changed at a rate of 69.7%. Migration accounted for 53.8%, while births and deaths accounted for 13.8%.

Most of the population (as of 2000) speaks French.(130 or 89.7%) as their first language, German is the second most common (9 or 6.2%) and English is the third (2 or 1.4%).

As of 2008, the population was 48.3% male and 51.7% female. The population was made up of 98 Swiss men (41.2% of the population) and 17 (7.1%) non-Swiss men. There were 101 Swiss women (42.4%) and 22 (9.2%) non-Swiss women. Of the population in the municipality, 42 or about 29.0% were born in Sévaz and lived there in 2000. There were 57 or 39.3% who were born in the same canton, while 34 or 23.4% were born somewhere else in Switzerland, and 10 or 6.9% were born outside of Switzerland.

The age distribution, as of 2000, in Sévaz is; 19 children or 13.1% of the population are between 0 and 9 years old and 14 teenagers or 9.7% are between 10 and 19. Of the adult population, 23 people or 15.9% of the population are between 20 and 29 years old. 29 people or 20.0% are between 30 and 39, 26 people or 17.9% are between 40 and 49, and 11 people or 7.6% are between 50 and 59. The senior population distribution is 15 people or 10.3% of the population are between 60 and 69 years old, 7 people or 4.8% are between 70 and 79, there is 1 person who is 80 and 89.

As of 2000, there were 66 people who were single and never married in the municipality. There were 60 married individuals, 8 widows or widowers and 11 individuals who are divorced.

As of 2000, there were 61 private households in the municipality, and an average of 2.3 persons per household. There were 18 households that consist of only one person and 4 households with five or more people. In 2000, a total of 61 apartments (87.1% of the total) were permanently occupied, while 6 apartments (8.6%) were seasonally occupied and 3 apartments (4.3%) were empty. As of 2009, the construction rate of new housing units was 4.1 new units per 1000 residents.

The historical population is given in the following chart:

== Heritage sites of national significance ==
The Iron Age metal workshop at Tudinges is listed as a Swiss heritage site of national significance.

== Politics ==
In the 2011 federal election the most popular party was the SVP which received 36.3% of the vote. The next three most popular parties were the CVP (23.4%), the SP (18.9%) and the FDP (11.2%).

The SVP improved their position in Sévaz rising to first, from second in 2007 (with 25.2%) The CVP moved from first in 2007 (with 29.0%) to second in 2011, the SPS retained about the same popularity (21.5% in 2007) and the FDP retained about the same popularity (15.0% in 2007). A total of 85 votes were cast in this election, of which 1 or 1.2% was invalid.

== Economy ==
As of 2010, Sévaz had an unemployment rate of 2.3%. As of 2008, there were 12 people employed in the primary economic sector and about 6 businesses involved in this sector. 73 people were employed in the secondary sector and there were 8 businesses in this sector. 87 people were employed in the tertiary sector, with 13 businesses in this sector. There were 78 residents of the municipality who were employed in some capacity, of which females made up 42.3% of the workforce.

In 2008 the total number of full-time equivalent jobs was 149. The number of jobs in the primary sector was 9, all of which were in agriculture. The number of jobs in the secondary sector was 63 of which 42 or (66.7%) were in manufacturing and 6 (9.5%) were in construction. The number of jobs in the tertiary sector was 77. In the tertiary sector; 28 or 36.4% were in wholesale or retail sales or the repair of motor vehicles, 33 or 42.9% were in the movement and storage of goods, 2 or 2.6% were in a hotel or restaurant, 2 or 2.6% were technical professionals or scientists, 1 was in education.

In 2000, there were 67 workers who commuted into the municipality and 51 workers who commuted away. The municipality is a net importer of workers, with about 1.3 workers entering the municipality for every one leaving. Of the working population, 5.1% used public transportation to get to work, and 69.2% used a private car.

== Religion ==
From the 2000 census, 111 or 76.6% were Roman Catholic, while 21 or 14.5% belonged to the Swiss Reformed Church. Of the rest of the population, there were 4 individuals (or about 2.76% of the population) who belonged to another Christian church. There was 1 individual who was Islamic. 8 (or about 5.52% of the population) belonged to no church, are agnostic or atheist, and 2 individuals (or about 1.38% of the population) did not answer the question.

== Education ==
In Sévaz about 62 or (42.8%) of the population have completed non-mandatory upper secondary education, and 17 or (11.7%) have completed additional higher education (either university or a Fachhochschule). Of the 17 who completed tertiary schooling, 82.4% were Swiss men, 17.6% were Swiss women.

The Canton of Fribourg school system provides one year of non-obligatory Kindergarten, followed by six years of Primary school. This is followed by three years of obligatory lower Secondary school where the students are separated according to ability and aptitude. Following the lower Secondary students may attend a three or four year optional upper Secondary school. The upper Secondary school is divided into gymnasium (university preparatory) and vocational programs. After they finish the upper Secondary program, students may choose to attend a Tertiary school or continue their apprenticeship.

During the 2010–11 school year, there were a total of 21 students attending one class in Sévaz. A total of 55 students from the municipality attended any school, either in the municipality or outside of it. There were no kindergarten classes in the municipality, but 6 students attended kindergarten in a neighboring municipality. The municipality had one primary class and 21 students. During the same year, there were no lower secondary classes in the municipality, but 14 students attended lower secondary school in a neighboring municipality. There were no upper Secondary classes or vocational classes, but there was one upper Secondary vocational student who attended classes in another municipality. The municipality had no non-university Tertiary classes, but there was one non-university Tertiary student who attended classes in another municipality.

As of 2000, there were 10 students in Sévaz who came from another municipality, while 16 residents attended schools outside the municipality.
