= Chenaux Castle =

Castle in Fribourg, Switzerland

- Estavayer-le-Lac
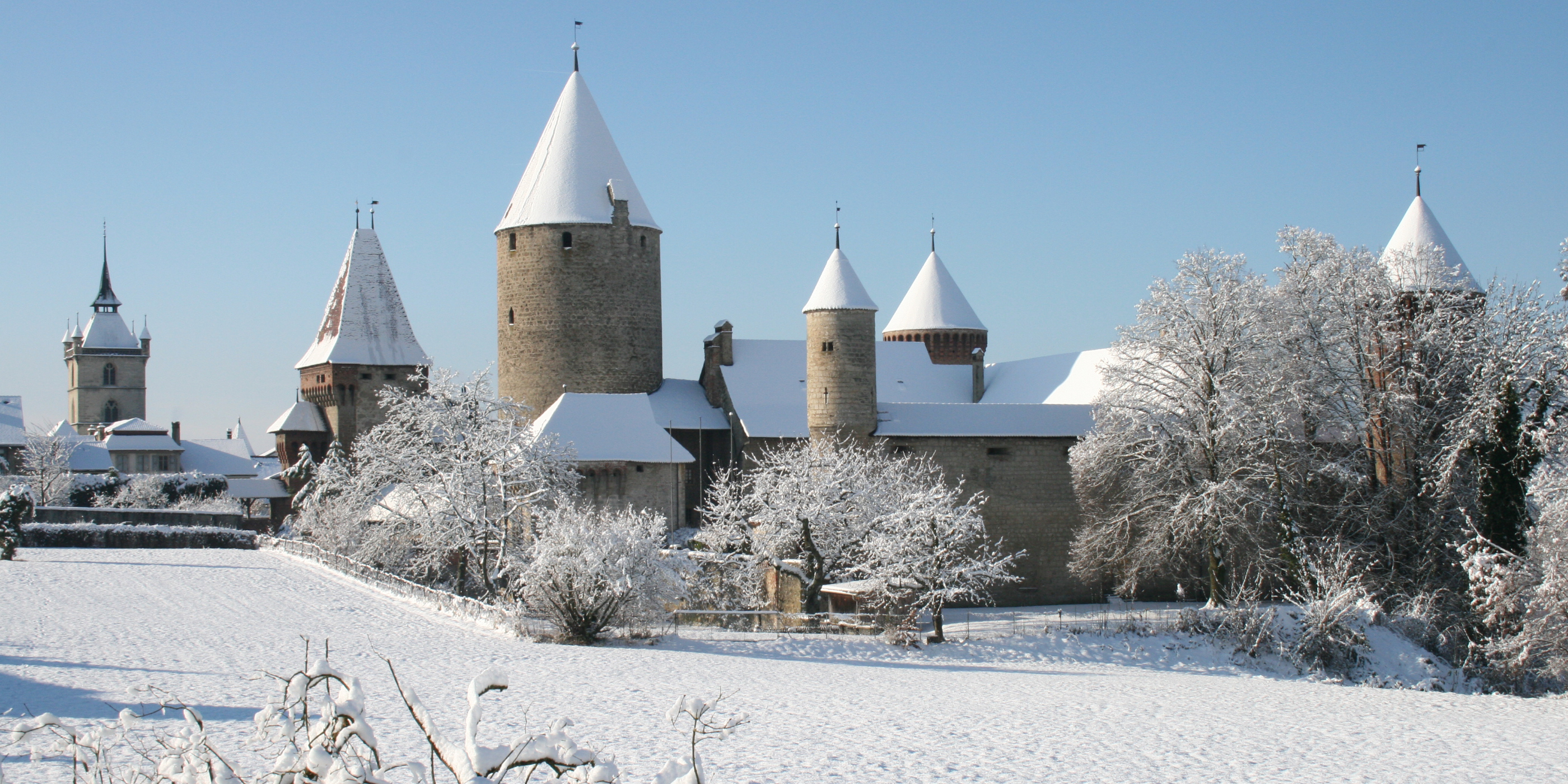
- Chenaux Castle

Site information
- Code: CH-FR

Location
- Coordinates: 46°51′05″N 6°50′56″E

Site history
- Built: 14th century

Chenaux Castle is a castle in the municipality of Estavayer-le-Lac of the Canton of Fribourg in Switzerland. It is a Swiss heritage site of national significance.

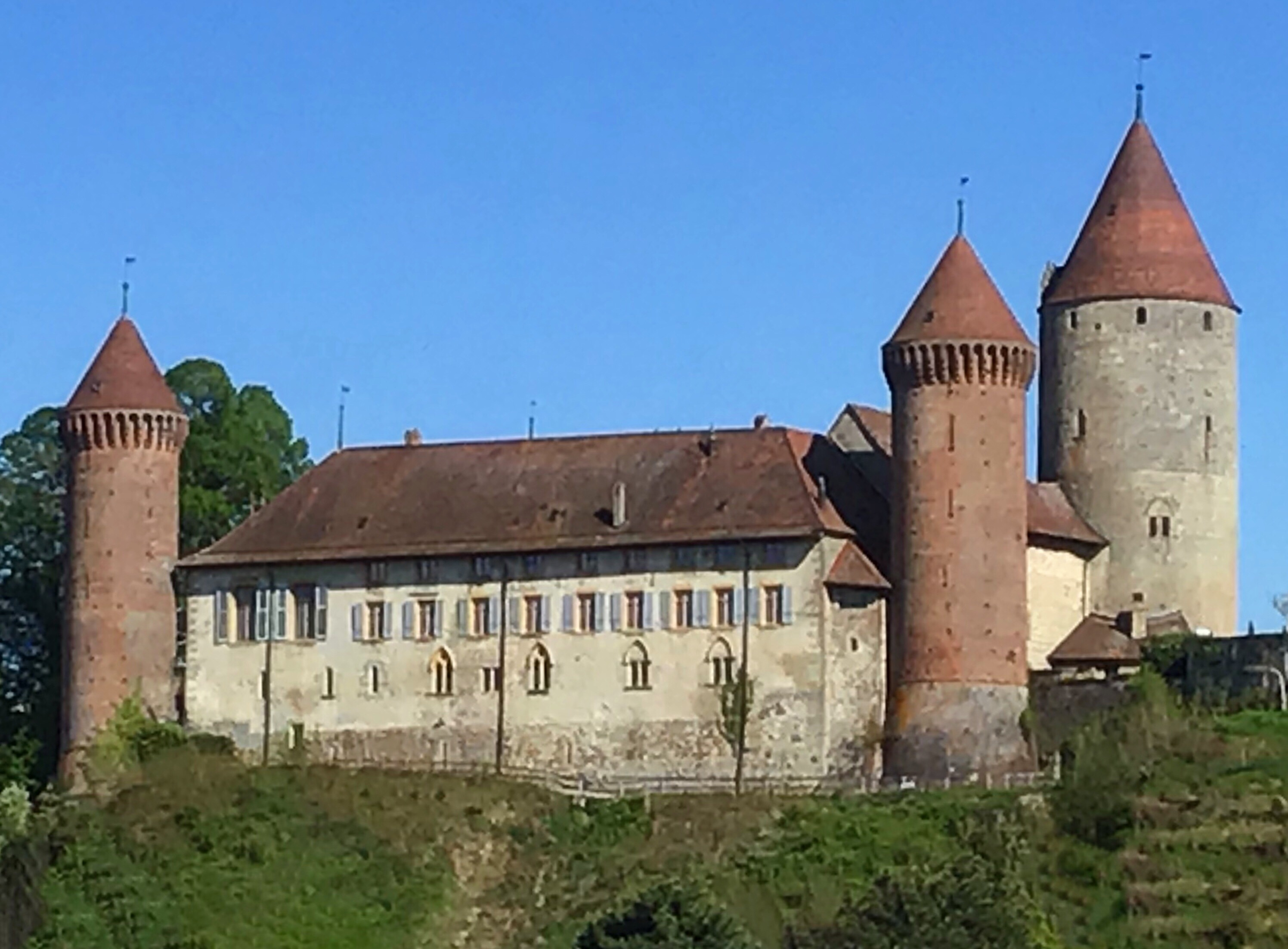
Chenau Castle

== History ==
It was built in 1284 by Pierre d'Estavayer and his brother Guillaume on the model of the “Carre Savoyard” or "Savoyard square”. Pierre d’Estavayer was in the service of King Edward I of England as a knight during the Welsh Wars. He was a nephew of Otto de Grandson the justiciar of North Wales. In 1286 his uncle gave him Tipperary in Ireland for life, making him Lord of Tipperary. In 1290 he travelled with his uncle and was at the fall of Acre in 1291, returning then to Switzerland.

His brother Guillaume is also recorded in 1283 as being in the service of King Edward I of England. His uncle enabled him to be a canon at Lincoln, being Archdeacon in 1316.

Pierre died in 1322 and Guillaume in 1324.

== See also ==
- List of castles in Switzerland
- Château
