= Broye District =

Coordinates: 46°49′19″N 6°54′09″E

- District
- Flag Coat of arms
- Country: Switzerland
- Canton: Fribourg
- Capital: Estavayer-le-Lac

Area
  - Total: 173.88 km^{2} (67.14 sq mi)

Population (31 December 2020)
  - Total: 33,901
  - Density: 194.97/km^{2} (504.96/sq mi)
- Time zone: UTC+1 (CET)
  - Summer (DST): UTC+2 (CEST)
- Municipalities: 17
- Website: www.fr.ch/pref/fr/pub/pbr/index.cfm

Broye District (French: [distʁi(kt) d(ə) la bʁwa]; Arpitan: District de la Brouye [diʃˈtʁi də la ˈbʁuj(ə)]; German: Broyebezirk) is one of the seven districts of the Canton of Fribourg, Switzerland, lying in the vicinity of Lake Neuchâtel. Its territory is non-contiguous and Broye is fragmented into four parts, three of which exist as exclaves from the canton of Fribourg. It has a population of 33,901 (as of 31 December 2020).

== Municipalities ==
Broye consists of the following municipalities, of which Estavayer is the capital:

Coat of Arms	Municipality	Population (31 December 2020)	Area in km^{2}
Belmont-Broye	Belmont-Broye	5,635	25.79
Châtillon	Châtillon	520	1.3
Cheyres-Châbles	Cheyres-Châbles	2,320	9.74
Cugy	Cugy	1,847	9.88
Delley-Portalban	Delley-Portalban	1,222	6.9
Estavayer	Estavayer	9,988	40.13
Fétigny-Ménières	Fétigny-Ménières		8.48
Gletterens	Gletterens	1,094	2.58
Les Montets	Les Montets	1,535	10.29
Lully	Lully	1,156	5.5
Montagny	Montagny	2,712	17.54
Nuvilly	Nuvilly	471	3.98
Prévondavaux	Prévondavaux	83	1.82
Saint-Aubin	Saint-Aubin	1,886	7.89
Sévaz	Sévaz	318	2.5
Surpierre	Surpierre	1143	14.8
Vallon	Vallon	464	3.51
	Total	33,901	140.2

== Mergers and name changes ==
- On 1 January 1981 the former municipalities of La Vounaise and Montborget merged into the municipality of Murist.
- In 1991 the former municipality Les Friques merged into the municipality Saint-Aubin.
- On 31 December 1991 the former municipality of Franex merged into the municipality Murist.
- In 1994 the former municipality Chandon merged into the municipality Léchelles
- On 1 January 2000 the former municipalities of Montagny-la-Ville and Montagny-les-Monts merged to form the new municipality of Montagny (FR).
- On 1 January 2004 the former municipalities of Aumont, Frasses, Granges-de-Vesin and Montet (Broye) merged to form the new municipality of Les Montets. On 1 January 2004 the former municipality of Mannens-Grandsivaz merged into Montagny. The former municipality of Chapelle (Broye) merged into the municipality of Cheiry.
- On 1 January 2005 the former municipalities of Delley and Portalban merged to form the new municipality of Delley-Portalban. On 1 January 2005 the former municipality of Vesin merged into Cugy. The former municipality of Praratoud merged into the municipality of Surpierre.
- On 1 January 2006 the former municipalities of Autavaux, Forel (FR) and Montbrelloz merged to form the new municipality of Vernay. On 1 January 2006 the former municipalities of Bollion and Seiry merged into the municipality of Lully.
- On 1 January 2012 the municipality of Font merged into the municipality of Estavayer-le-Lac.
- On 1 January 2016 the municipalities of Domdidier, Dompierre, Léchelles and Russy merged into the new municipality Belmont-Broye.
- On 1 January 2017 the municipalities of Châbles and Cheyres merged to form Cheyres-Châbles. Bussy, Estavayer-le-Lac, Morens, Murist, Rueyres-les-Prés, Vuissens and Vernay merged to form Estavayer. Villeneuve merged into Surpierre.
- On 1 January 2021 the former municipality of Cheiry merged into the municipality of Surpierre.
- On 1 January 2026 the former municipalities of Fétigny and Ménières merged into the municipality of Fétigny-Ménières.

== Coat of arms ==
The blazon of the district coat of arms is Argent, a [double] Rose Gules seeded Or and barbed Vert.

== Demographics ==
Broye has a population (as of December 2020) of 33,901. As of 2008, 13.6% of the population are resident foreign nationals.

Most of the population (as of 2000) speaks French (18,694 or 87.7%) as their first language, German is the second most common (1,341 or 6.3%) and Portuguese is the third (318 or 1.5%). There are 177 people who speak Italian and 6 people who speak Romansh.

As of 2008, the population was 49.6% male and 50.4% female. The population was made up of 10,860 Swiss men (41.9% of the population) and 2,011 (7.8%) non-Swiss men. There were 11,178 Swiss women (43.1%) and 1,892 (7.3%) non-Swiss women.

Of the population in the district, 7,750 or about 36.4% were born in Broye and lived there in 2000. There were 5,240 or 24.6% who were born in the same canton, while 4,922 or 23.1% were born somewhere else in Switzerland, and 2,717 or 12.8% were born outside of Switzerland.

The age distribution, as of 2000, in Broye is; 2,953 children or 13.9% of the population are between 0 and 9 years old and 2,813 teenagers or 13.2% are between 10 and 19. Of the adult population, 2,528 people or 11.9% of the population are between 20 and 29 years old. 3,555 people or 16.7% are between 30 and 39, 3,023 people or 14.2% are between 40 and 49, and 2,669 people or 12.5% are between 50 and 59. The senior population distribution is 1,669 people or 7.8% of the population are between 60 and 69 years old, 1,325 people or 6.2% are between 70 and 79, there are 670 people or 3.1% who are between 80 and 89, and there are 104 people or 0.5% who are 90 and older.

As of 2000, there were 9,082 people who were single and never married in the district. There were 10,189 married individuals, 1,164 widows or widowers and 874 individuals who are divorced.

The historical population is given in the following chart:

== Politics ==
In the 2011 federal election the most popular party was the SP which received 24.6% of the vote. The next three most popular parties were the SVP (23.8%), the CVP (23.5%) and the FDP (13.5%).

== Religion ==
From the 2000 census, 14,847 or 69.7% were Roman Catholic, while 2,990 or 14.0% belonged to the Swiss Reformed Church. Of the rest of the population, there were 102 members of an Orthodox church (or about 0.48% of the population), there were 33 individuals (or about 0.15% of the population) who belonged to the Christian Catholic Church, and there were 580 individuals (or about 2.72% of the population) who belonged to another Christian church. There were 12 individuals (or about 0.06% of the population) who were Jewish, and 649 (or about 3.05% of the population) who were Islamic. There were 21 individuals who were Buddhist, 6 individuals who were Hindu and 16 individuals who belonged to another church. 1,520 (or about 7.13% of the population) belonged to no church, are agnostic or atheist, and 809 individuals (or about 3.80% of the population) did not answer the question.

== Education ==
In Broye about 7,183 or (33.7%) of the population have completed non-mandatory upper secondary education, and 1,932 or (9.1%) have completed additional higher education (either university or a Fachhochschule). Of the 1,932 who completed tertiary schooling, 61.2% were Swiss men, 25.6% were Swiss women, 6.2% were non-Swiss men and 7.0% were non-Swiss women.

The Canton of Fribourg school system provides one year of non-obligatory Kindergarten, followed by six years of Primary school. This is followed by three years of obligatory lower Secondary school where the students are separated according to ability and aptitude. Following the lower Secondary students may attend a three or four year optional upper Secondary school. The upper Secondary school is divided into gymnasium (university preparatory) and vocational programs. After they finish the upper Secondary program, students may choose to attend a Tertiary school or continue their apprenticeship. During the 2010–11 school year, there were a total of 3,841 students attending 204 classes in District de la Broye. A total of 4,464 students from the district attended any school, either in the district or outside of it. There were 31 kindergarten classes with a total of 578 students in the district. There were 106 primary classes with a total of 2,067 students. There were 52 lower secondary classes with a total of 1,090 students. There were 2 upper Secondary classes, with 33 upper Secondary students. There were 13 special Tertiary classes, with 73 specialized Tertiary students.
