= Franz Wilhelm =

Swiss fencer

Personal information
- Born: 7 September 1884 La Chaux-de-Fonds, Switzerland
- Died: 25 February 1968 (aged 83) Estavayer-le-Lac, Switzerland

Sport
- Sport: Fencing

Franz Wilhelm (7 September 1884 – 25 February 1968) was a Swiss fencer. He competed in the team épée event at the 1920 Summer Olympics.
