= Granges-de-Vesin =

Former municipality, canton of Fribourg

- Former municipality
- Granges-de-Vesin

- Coat of arms
- Location of Granges-de-Vesin
- Location within Switzerland Location within Canton of Fribourg
- Coordinates: 46.816669°N 6.850006°E
- Country: Switzerland
- Canton: Fribourg
- District: Broye
- Municipality: Les Montets

Population (2000)
  - Total: 147
- Time zone: UTC+01:00 (CET)
  - Summer (DST): UTC+02:00 (CEST)
- ISO 3166 code: CH-FR
- Website

Granges-de-Vesin is a former municipality in the Broye district of the canton of Fribourg, Switzerland. In 2004 it merged with Aumont, Frasses and Montet (Broye) to form the municipality of Les Montets.

== History ==
Granges-de-Vesin is first mentioned in 1330 as Grangi de Visins. It was part of the lordship of Aumont and Montet. The Estavayer, Illens, Gléresse, Reyff and Lanthen-Heid families held feudal rights and property there. Granges-de-Vesin belonged to the bailiwick of Estavayer and then, from 1798 to 1848, to the district of the same name. In 1804 it separated from Aumont, with which it had formed a commune générale (general municipality), and became an independent municipality. In church matters, it originally came under the parish of Cugy and later under that of Aumont.

A small school building dates from 1836. The economy is agricultural, with many commuters working outside the village. Land consolidation began in 1989.

Granges-de-Vesin had 127 inhabitants in 1811, 204 in 1850, 153 in 1900, 106 in 1950, 88 in 1980 and 147 in 2000. The arrival of the A1 motorway reversed the population trend. In 2004 Granges-de-Vesin merged with Aumont, Frasses and Montet (Broye) to form Les Montets.
