= Bussy, Fribourg =

Bussy
- Former municipality
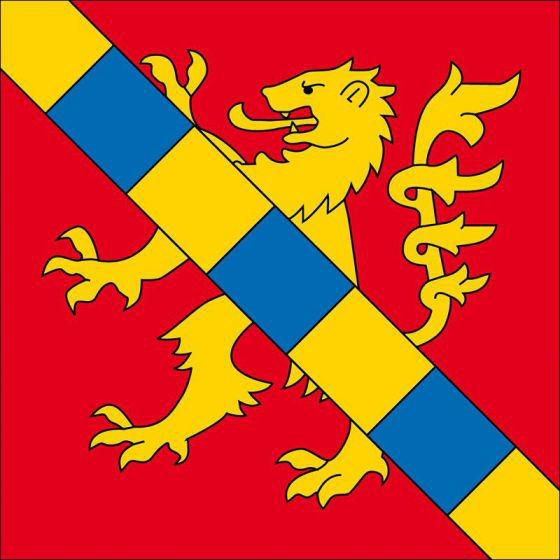
- Coat of arms
- Location of Bussy
- Location within Switzerland Location within Canton of Fribourg
- Coordinates: 46°50′N 6°53′E
- Country: Switzerland
- Canton: Fribourg
- District: Broye

Government
  - Mayor: Syndic

Area
  - Total: 3.60 km^{2} (1.39 sq mi)
- Elevation: 468 m (1,535 ft)

Population (Dec 2015)
  - Total: 483
  - Density: 134/km^{2} (347/sq mi)
- Time zone: UTC+01:00 (CET)
  - Summer (DST): UTC+02:00 (CEST)
- Postal code: 1541
- SFOS number: 2004
- ISO 3166 code: CH-FR
- Surrounded by: Cugy, Les Montets, Montbrelloz, Morens, Payerne (VD), Sévaz
- Website: SFSO statistics

Bussy (French pronunciation: [bysi]; Arpitan: Bussê) is a former municipality in the district of Broye in the canton of Fribourg in Switzerland. On 1 January 2017 the former municipalities of Bussy, Estavayer-le-Lac, Morens, Murist, Rueyres-les-Prés, Vernay and Vuissens merged into the new municipality of Estavayer.

== History ==
Bussy is first mentioned in 1142 as Bussey.

== Geography ==
Bussy had an area, as of 2009, of 3.6 square kilometers (1.4 mi^{2}). Of this area, 2.95 km^{2} (1.14 mi^{2}) or 81.9% is used for agricultural purposes, while 0.2 km^{2} (0.077 mi^{2}) or 5.6% is forested. Of the rest of the land, 0.44 km^{2} (0.17 mi^{2}) or 12.2% is settled (buildings or roads), 0.03 km^{2} (7.4 acres) or 0.8% is either rivers or lakes.

Of the built up area, housing and buildings made up 2.2% and transportation infrastructure made up 9.2%. Out of the forested land, 4.2% of the total land area is heavily forested and 1.4% is covered with orchards or small clusters of trees. Of the agricultural land, 73.1% is used for growing crops and 8.1% is pastures. All the water in the municipality is flowing water.

The former municipality is located in the Broye district, in the Estavayer-le-Lac exclave.

== Coat of arms ==
The blazon of the municipal coat of arms is Gules, a Lion rampant Or, overall a Bendlet compony Or and Azure.

== Demographics ==
Bussy had a population (as of 2015) of 483. As of 2008, 7.6% of the population are resident foreign nationals. Over the last 10 years (2000–2010) the population has changed at a rate of 39.2%. Migration accounted for 36%, while births and deaths accounted for 0.8%.

Most of the population (as of 2000) speaks French (239 or 97.6%) as their first language, German is the second most common (2 or 0.8%) and Italian is the third (2 or 0.8%).

As of 2008, the population was 49.6% male and 50.4% female. The population was made up of 159 Swiss men (45.8% of the population) and 13 (3.7%) non-Swiss men. There were 162 Swiss women (46.7%) and 13 (3.7%) non-Swiss women. Of the population in the municipality, 124 or about 50.6% were born in Bussy and lived there in 2000. There were 74 or 30.2% who were born in the same canton, while 31 or 12.7% were born somewhere else in Switzerland, and 16 or 6.5% were born outside of Switzerland.

The age distribution, as of 2000, in Bussy is; 31 children or 12.7% of the population are between 0 and 9 years old and 22 teenagers or 9.0% are between 10 and 19. Of the adult population, 29 people or 11.8% of the population are between 20 and 29 years old. 35 people or 14.3% are between 30 and 39, 34 people or 13.9% are between 40 and 49, and 32 people or 13.1% are between 50 and 59. The senior population distribution is 30 people or 12.2% of the population are between 60 and 69 years old, 20 people or 8.2% are between 70 and 79, there are 8 people or 3.3% who are between 80 and 89, and there are 4 people or 1.6% who are 90 and older.

As of 2000, there were 93 people who were single and never married in the municipality. There were 130 married individuals, 17 widows or widowers and 5 individuals who are divorced.

As of 2000, there were 98 private households in the municipality, and an average of 2.5 persons per household. There were 22 households that consist of only one person and 6 households with five or more people. In 2000, a total of 98 apartments (94.2% of the total) were permanently occupied, while 5 apartments (4.8%) were seasonally occupied and one apartment was empty. As of 2009, the construction rate of new housing units was 23 new units per 1000 residents.

The historical population is given in the following chart:

== Heritage sites of national significance ==
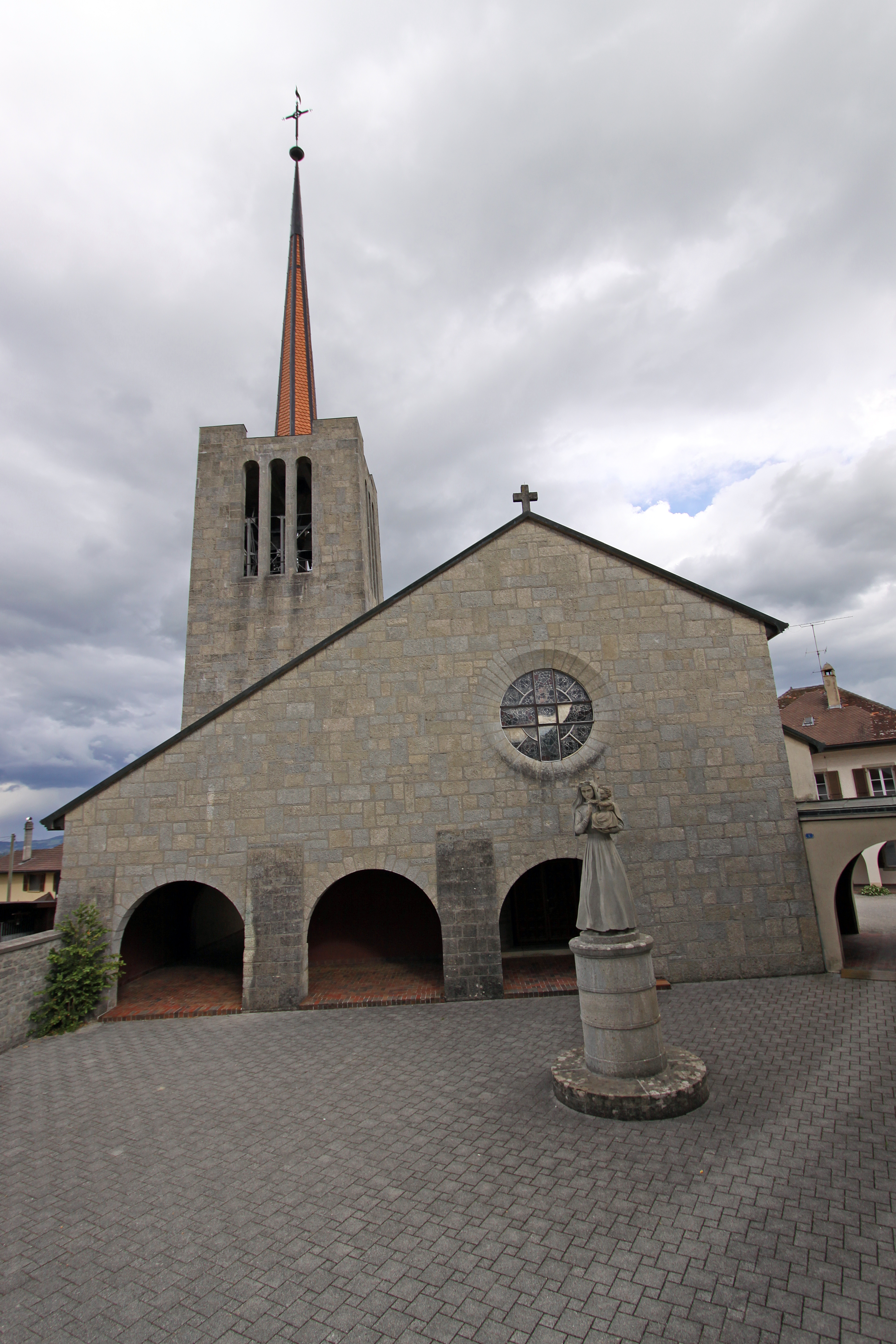
Church of Saint-Maurice

The Church of Saint-Maurice is listed as a Swiss heritage site of national significance. The entire village of Bussy is part of the Inventory of Swiss Heritage Sites.

== Politics ==
In the 2011 federal election the most popular party was the SVP which received 26.2% of the vote. The next three most popular parties were the CVP (23.4%), the SP (22.3%) and the FDP (12.8%).

The SVP improved their position in Bussy rising to first, from second with 22.3% The CVP changed from first in 2007 to second in 2011 while the SPS increased in popularity (22.3% in 2007 to 23.4% in 2011) and the FDP remained about the same (16.6% in 2007 to 12.8% in 2011). A total of 159 votes were cast in this election, of which 2 or 1.3% were invalid.

== Economy ==
As of 2010, Bussy had an unemployment rate of 1.9%. As of 2008, there were 31 people employed in the primary economic sector and about 7 businesses involved in this sector. 16 people were employed in the secondary sector and there were 5 businesses in this sector. 49 people were employed in the tertiary sector, with 12 businesses in this sector. There were 134 residents of the municipality who were employed in some capacity, of which females made up 41.8% of the workforce.

In 2008 the total number of full-time equivalent jobs was 75. The number of jobs in the primary sector was 20, all of which were in agriculture. The number of jobs in the secondary sector was 14 of which 1 was in manufacturing and 12 (85.7%) were in construction. The number of jobs in the tertiary sector was 41. In the tertiary sector; 29 or 70.7% were in wholesale or retail sales or the repair of motor vehicles, 4 or 9.8% were in the movement and storage of goods, 3 or 7.3% were in a hotel or restaurant, 1 was a technical professional or scientist, 5 or 12.2% were in education.

In 2000, there were 27 workers who commuted into the municipality and 86 workers who commuted away. The municipality is a net exporter of workers, with about 3.2 workers leaving the municipality for every one entering. Of the working population, 5.2% used public transportation to get to work, and 59.7% used a private car.

== Religion ==
From the 2000 census, 209 or 85.3% were Roman Catholic, while 28 or 11.4% belonged to the Swiss Reformed Church. Of the rest of the population, there were 2 members of an Orthodox church (or about 0.82% of the population), and there were 5 individuals (or about 2.04% of the population) who belonged to another Christian church. There was 1 person who was Hindu. 2 (or about 0.82% of the population) belonged to no church, are agnostic or atheist.

== Education ==
In Bussy about 103 or (42.0%) of the population have completed non-mandatory upper secondary education, and 15 or (6.1%) have completed additional higher education (either university or a Fachhochschule). Of the 15 who completed tertiary schooling, 86.7% were Swiss men, 13.3% were Swiss women.

The Canton of Fribourg school system provides one year of non-obligatory Kindergarten, followed by six years of Primary school. This is followed by three years of obligatory lower Secondary school where the students are separated according to ability and aptitude. Following the lower Secondary students may attend a three or four year optional upper Secondary school. The upper Secondary school is divided into gymnasium (university preparatory) and vocational programs. After they finish the upper Secondary program, students may choose to attend a Tertiary school or continue their apprenticeship.

During the 2010–11 school year, there were a total of 40 students attending 2 classes in Bussy. A total of 50 students from the municipality attended any school, either in the municipality or outside of it. There were no kindergarten classes in the municipality, but 4 students attended kindergarten in a neighboring municipality. There were 2 primary classes with a total of 40 students. There were no lower secondary classes in the municipality, but 13 students attended lower secondary school in a neighboring municipality. There were no upper Secondary classes or vocational classes, but there were 6 upper Secondary vocational students who attended classes in another municipality. There were no non-university Tertiary classes, but there were 2 non-university Tertiary students who attended classes in another municipality.

As of 2000, there were 9 students in Bussy who came from another municipality, while 25 residents attended schools outside the municipality.
