= Gabriel Bullet =

- Titular Bishop of Glavinitza
- Church: Roman Catholic Church
- See: Titular See of Glavinitza
- In office: 1970 - current
- Predecessor: none
- Successor: current

Orders
- Ordination: 8 July 1945

Personal details
- Born: 22 March 1921; Estavayer-le-Lac, Switzerland
- Died: 7 September 2011 (aged 90); Lausanne

Gabriel Bullet (22 March 1921 – 7 September 2011) was a Swiss prelate of the Roman Catholic Church.

Bullet was born in Estavayer-le-Lac, Switzerland and was ordained a priest on 8 July 1945. Bullet was appointed auxiliary bishop of the Diocese of Lausanne, Geneva and Fribourg on 29 December 1970 as well as titular bishop of Glavinitza and ordained bishop on 6 February 1971. Bullet resigned from the diocese on 16 November 1993. Until his death, Bullet held the title of Titular Bishop of Glavinitza.
