= Vuissens =

- Former municipality
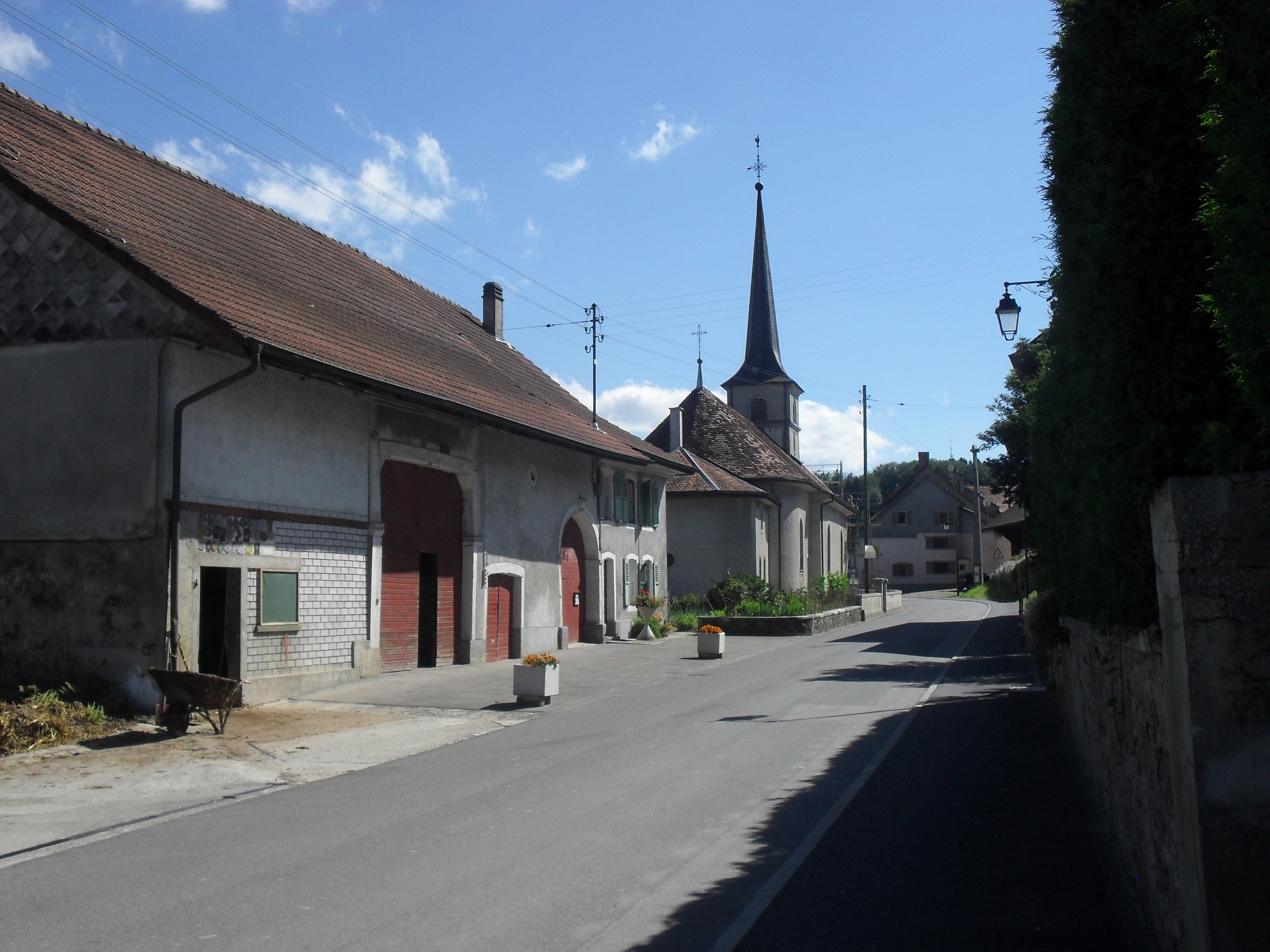

- Coat of arms
- Location of Vuissens
- Location within Switzerland Location within Canton of Fribourg
- Coordinates: 46°44′N 6°46′E
- Country: Switzerland
- Canton: Fribourg
- District: Broye

Government
  - Mayor: Syndic

Area
  - Total: 5.62 km^{2} (2.17 sq mi)
- Elevation: 741 m (2,431 ft)

Population (Dec 2015)
  - Total: 245
  - Density: 43.6/km^{2} (113/sq mi)
- Time zone: UTC+01:00 (CET)
  - Summer (DST): UTC+02:00 (CEST)
- Postal code: 1486
- SFOS number: 2049
- ISO 3166 code: CH-FR
- Surrounded by: Champtauroz (VD), Chanéaz (VD), Combremont-le-Petit (VD), Correvon (VD), Démoret (VD), Denezy (VD), Thierrens (VD)
- Website: SFSO statistics

Vuissens (French: [ɥisɑ̃s]; Arpitan: Vouéssens [wɛˈsɛ̃]) is a former municipality in the district of Broye, in the canton of Fribourg, Switzerland. On 1 January 2017 the former municipalities of Vuissens, Bussy, Estavayer-le-Lac, Morens, Murist, Rueyres-les-Prés and Vernay merged into the new municipality of Estavayer.

== Geography ==
Vuissens had an area, as of 2009, of 5.6 square kilometers (2.2 mi^{2}). Of this area, 2.86 km^{2} (1.10 mi^{2}) or 51.0% is used for agricultural purposes, while 2.04 km^{2} (0.79 mi^{2}) or 36.4% is forested. Of the rest of the land, 0.7 km^{2} (0.27 mi^{2}) or 12.5% is settled (buildings or roads).

Of the built up area, housing and buildings made up 0.9% and transportation infrastructure made up 2.0%. while parks, green belts and sports fields made up 9.4%. Out of the forested land, all of the forested land area is covered with heavy forests. Of the agricultural land, 44.6% is used for growing crops and 6.1% is pastures.

== Coat of arms ==
The blazon of the municipal coat of arms is Gules, a Chevron raguly Or.

== Demographics ==
Vuissens had a population (as of 2015) of 245. As of 2008, 10.5% of the population are resident foreign nationals. Over the last 10 years (2000–2010) the population has changed at a rate of 4%. Migration accounted for 5.2%, while births and deaths accounted for 2.3%.

Most of the population (as of 2000) speaks French (159 or 93.0%) as their first language, Albanian is the second most common (6 or 3.5%) and German is the third (4 or 2.3%).

As of 2008, the population was 52.3% male and 47.7% female. The population was made up of 79 Swiss men (45.4% of the population) and 12 (6.9%) non-Swiss men. There were 77 Swiss women (44.3%) and 6 (3.4%) non-Swiss women. Of the population in the municipality, 78 or about 45.6% were born in Vuissens and lived there in 2000. There were 28 or 16.4% who were born in the same canton, while 51 or 29.8% were born somewhere else in Switzerland, and 12 or 7.0% were born outside of Switzerland.

The age distribution, as of 2000, in Vuissens is; 31 children or 18.1% of the population are between 0 and 9 years old and 19 teenagers or 11.1% are between 10 and 19. Of the adult population, 19 people or 11.1% of the population are between 20 and 29 years old. 25 people or 14.6% are between 30 and 39, 14 people or 8.2% are between 40 and 49, and 31 people or 18.1% are between 50 and 59. The senior population distribution is 15 people or 8.8% of the population are between 60 and 69 years old, 8 people or 4.7% are between 70 and 79, there are 9 people or 5.3% who are between 80 and 89.

As of 2000, there were 77 people who were single and never married in the municipality. There were 81 married individuals, 6 widows or widowers and 7 individuals who are divorced.

As of 2000, there were 61 private households in the municipality, and an average of 2.8 persons per household. There were 14 households that consist of only one person and 11 households with five or more people. In 2000, a total of 60 apartments (85.7% of the total) were permanently occupied, while 5 apartments (7.1%) were seasonally occupied and 5 apartments (7.1%) were empty.

The historical population is given in the following chart:

== Sights ==
The entire village of Vuissens is designated as part of the Inventory of Swiss Heritage Sites.

== Politics ==
In the 2011 federal election the most popular party was the CVP which received 36.1% of the vote. The next three most popular parties were the SP (22.0%), the SVP (16.3%) and the FDP (15.2%).

The CVP received about the same percentage of the vote as they did in the 2007 Federal election (31.3% in 2007 vs 36.1% in 2011). The SPS moved from third in 2007 (with 20.2%) to second in 2011, the SVP moved from second in 2007 (with 24.3%) to third and the FDP retained about the same popularity (13.4% in 2007). A total of 63 votes were cast in this election.

== Economy ==
As of 2010, Vuissens had an unemployment rate of 2.1%. As of 2008, there were 22 people employed in the primary economic sector and about 10 businesses involved in this sector. 2 people were employed in the secondary sector and there was 1 business in this sector. 28 people were employed in the tertiary sector, with 5 businesses in this sector. There were 75 residents of the municipality who were employed in some capacity, of which females made up 42.7% of the workforce.

In 2008 the total number of full-time equivalent jobs was 43. The number of jobs in the primary sector was 17, all of which were in agriculture. The number of jobs in the secondary sector was 1, all of which were in construction. The number of jobs in the tertiary sector was 25. In the tertiary sector; 4 or 16.0% were in wholesale or retail sales or the repair of motor vehicles, 9 or 36.0% were in a hotel or restaurant, .

In 2000, there were 5 workers who commuted into the municipality and 54 workers who commuted away. The municipality is a net exporter of workers, with about 10.8 workers leaving the municipality for every one entering. Of the working population, 4% used public transportation to get to work, and 72% used a private car.

== Religion ==
From the 2000 census, 109 or 63.7% were Roman Catholic, while 35 or 20.5% belonged to the Swiss Reformed Church. Of the rest of the population, there was 1 individual who belongs to another Christian church. There were 6 (or about 3.51% of the population) who were Islamic. 19 (or about 11.11% of the population) belonged to no church, are agnostic or atheist, and 1 individuals (or about 0.58% of the population) did not answer the question.

== Education ==
In Vuissens about 53 or (31.0%) of the population have completed non-mandatory upper secondary education, and 15 or (8.8%) have completed additional higher education (either university or a Fachhochschule). Of the 15 who completed tertiary schooling, 73.3% were Swiss men, 26.7% were Swiss women.

The Canton of Fribourg school system provides one year of non-obligatory Kindergarten, followed by six years of Primary school. This is followed by three years of obligatory lower Secondary school where the students are separated according to ability and aptitude. Following the lower Secondary students may attend a three or four year optional upper Secondary school. The upper Secondary school is divided into gymnasium (university preparatory) and vocational programs. After they finish the upper Secondary program, students may choose to attend a Tertiary school or continue their apprenticeship.

During the 2010–11 school year, there were no students attending school in Vuissens, but a total of 28 students attended school in other municipalities. There were no kindergarten classes in the municipality, but 1 student attended kindergarten in a neighboring municipality. The municipality had no primary school classes, but 14 students attended primary school in a neighboring municipality. During the same year, there were no lower secondary classes in the municipality, but 10 students attended lower secondary school in a neighboring municipality. There were no upper Secondary classes or vocational classes. who attended classes in another municipality. The municipality had no non-university Tertiary classes, but there was one non-university Tertiary student and 2 specialized Tertiary students who attended classes in another municipality.

As of 2000, there were 10 students in Vuissens who came from another municipality, while 22 residents attended schools outside the municipality.
