= Les Montets =

- Municipality
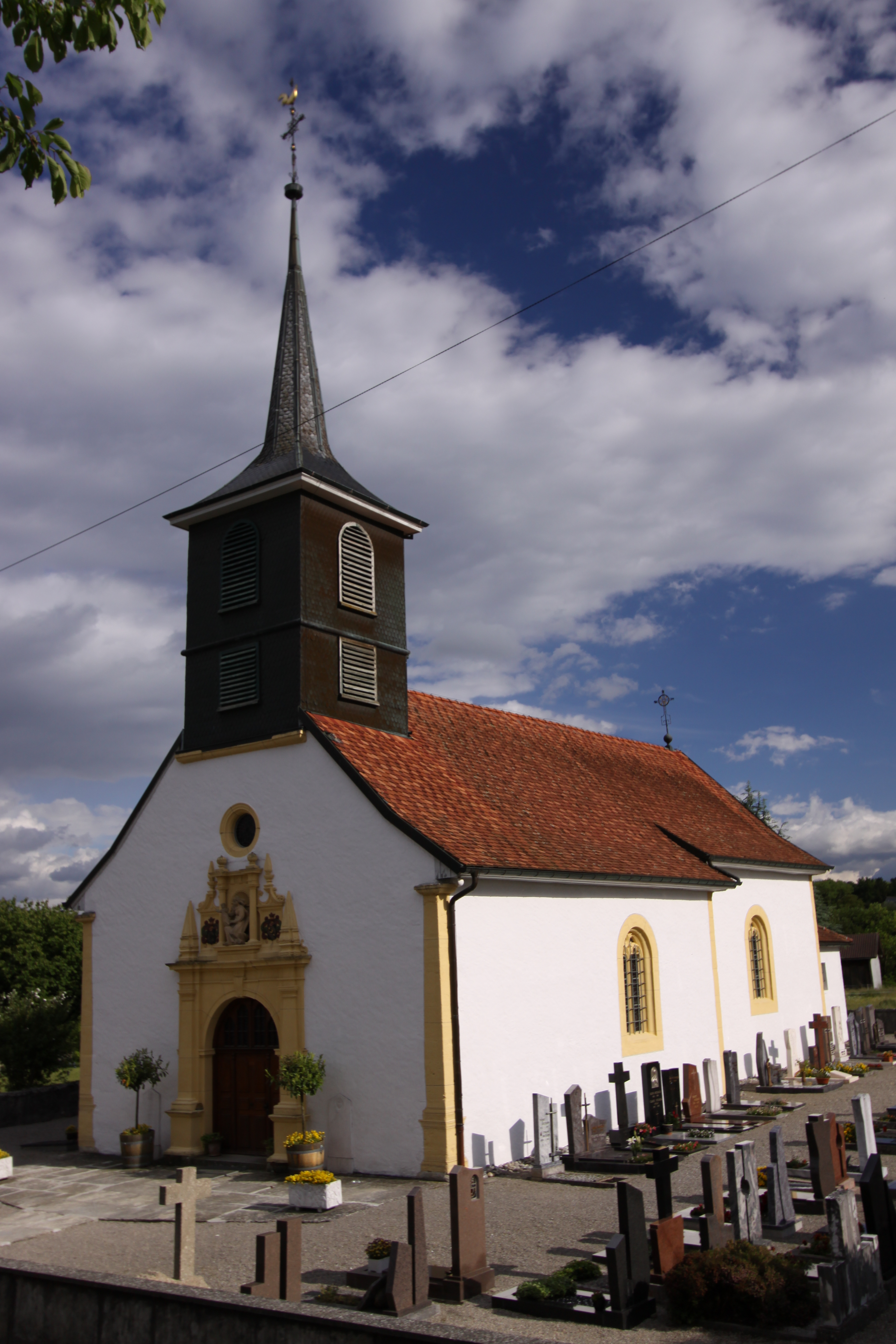
- Sainte-Trinité Church in Les Montets

- Coat of arms
- Location of Les Montets
- Location within Switzerland Location within Canton of Fribourg
- Coordinates: 46°49′N 6°52′E
- Country: Switzerland
- Canton: Fribourg
- District: Broye

Government
  - Mayor: Syndic

Area
  - Total: 10.35 km^{2} (4.00 sq mi)
- Elevation: 490 m (1,610 ft)

Population (December 2020)
  - Total: 1,535
  - Density: 148.3/km^{2} (384.1/sq mi)
- Time zone: UTC+01:00 (CET)
  - Summer (DST): UTC+02:00 (CEST)
- Postal code: 1483
- SFOS number: 2050
- ISO 3166 code: CH-FR
- Surrounded by: Bussy, Cugy, Estavayer-le-Lac, Lully, Fétigny-Ménières, Murist, Nuvilly, Sassel (VD), Seiry, Sévaz
- Website: les-montets.ch

Les Montets (Arpitan: Lè Montè) is a municipality in the district of Broye, in the canton of Fribourg, Switzerland. In 2004 the municipality was created through the merger of Aumont, Frasses, Granges-de-Vesin and Montet.

== History ==
Les Montets was created in 2004.

== Geography ==
Les Montets has an area, as of 2009, of 10.3 square kilometers (4.0 mi^{2}). Of this area, 6.15 km^{2} (2.37 mi^{2}) or 59.7% is used for agricultural purposes, while 3 km^{2} (1.2 mi^{2}) or 29.1% is forested. Of the rest of the land, 1.14 km^{2} (0.44 mi^{2}) or 11.1% is settled (buildings or roads), 0.01 km^{2} (2.5 acres) or 0.1% is either rivers or lakes and 0.01 km^{2} (2.5 acres) or 0.1% is unproductive land.

Of the built up area, housing and buildings made up 4.9% and transportation infrastructure made up 4.6%. Out of the forested land, 26.5% of the total land area is heavily forested and 2.6% is covered with orchards or small clusters of trees. Of the agricultural land, 45.5% is used for growing crops and 13.1% is pastures, while 1.1% is used for orchards or vine crops. All the water in the municipality is flowing water.

== Demographics ==
Les Montets has a population (as of December 2020) of 1,535. As of 2008, 14.0% of the population are resident foreign nationals. Over the last 10 years (2000–2010) the population has changed at a rate of 17.4%. Migration accounted for 17.8%, while births and deaths accounted for 1.9%.

Most of the population (as of 2000) speaks French (84.1%) as their first language, German is the second most common (6.2%) and Portuguese is the third (3.1%).

As of 2008, the population was 49.2% male and 50.8% female. The population was made up of 526 Swiss men (40.6% of the population) and 111 (8.6%) non-Swiss men. There were 515 Swiss women (39.8%) and 143 (11.0%) non-Swiss women.

The age distribution, as of 2000, in Les Montets is; 116 children or 10.5% of the population are between 0 and 9 years old and 136 teenagers or 12.3% are between 10 and 19. Of the adult population, 174 people or 15.8% of the population are between 20 and 29 years old. 190 people or 17.2% are between 30 and 39, 176 people or 15.9% are between 40 and 49, and 134 people or 12.1% are between 50 and 59. The senior population distribution is 73 people or 6.6% of the population are between 60 and 69 years old, 54 people or 4.9% are between 70 and 79, there are 43 people or 3.9% who are between 80 and 89, and there are 8 people or 0.7% who are 90 and older.

As of 2009, the construction rate of new housing units was 7.3 new units per 1000 residents. The vacancy rate for the municipality, in 2010, was 0.8%.

== Heritage sites of national significance ==
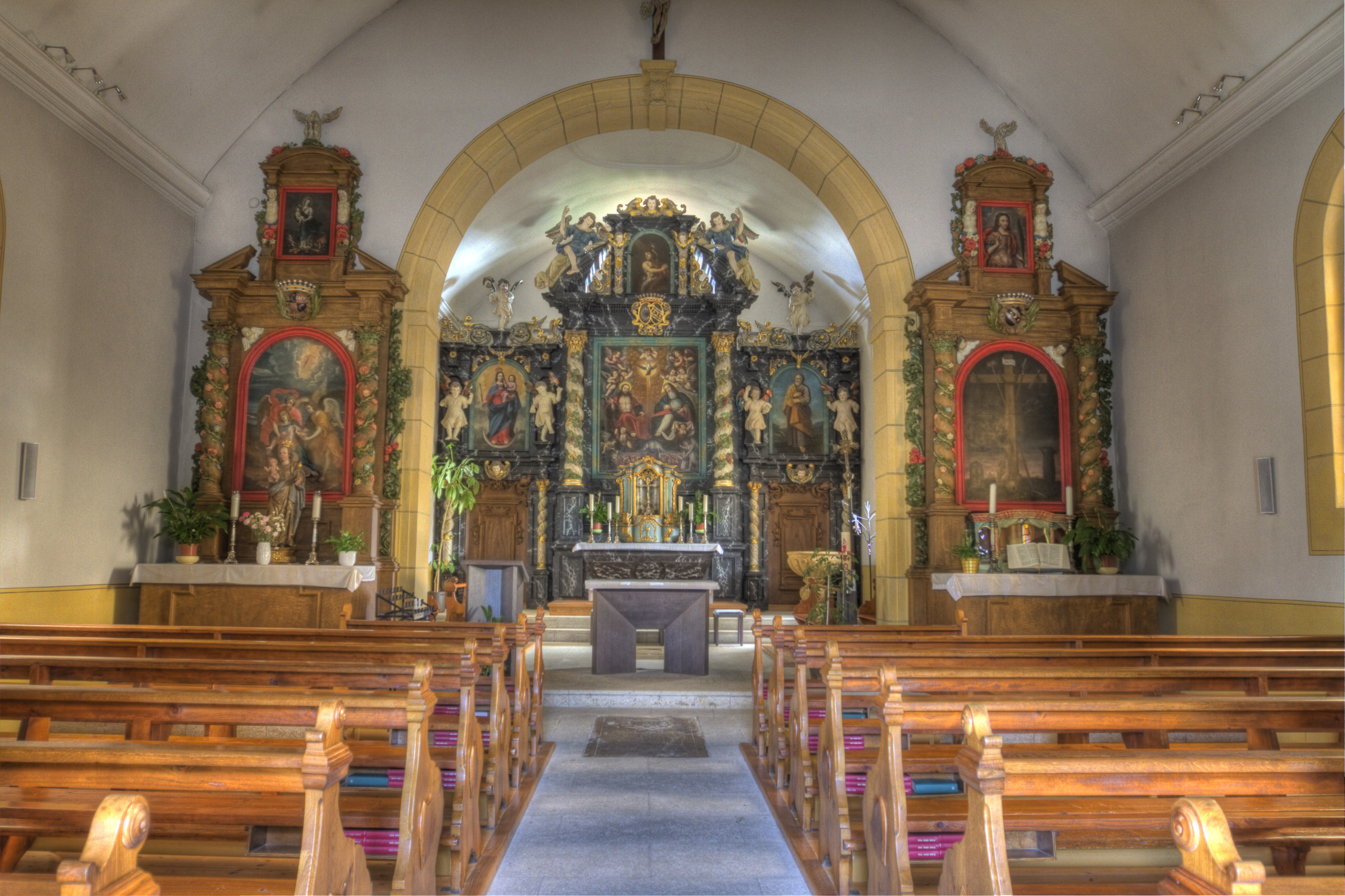
Interior of the Sainte-Trinité Church

The Paroissiale De La Sainte-Trinité Church is listed as a Swiss heritage site of national significance.

== Politics ==
In the 2011 federal election the most popular party was the SVP which received 28.9% of the vote. The next three most popular parties were the CVP (21.0%), the SP (20.6%) and the FDP (18.3%).

The SVP improved their position in Les Montets rising to first, from second in 2007 (with 24.4%) The CVP moved from first in 2007 (with 29.0%) to second in 2011, the SPS moved from fourth in 2007 (with 15.6%) to third and the FDP moved from third in 2007 (with 21.7%) to fourth. A total of 390 votes were cast in this election, of which 5 or 1.3% were invalid.

== Economy ==
As of 2010, Les Montets had an unemployment rate of 2.1%. As of 2008, there were 74 people employed in the primary economic sector and about 28 businesses involved in this sector. 123 people were employed in the secondary sector and there were 10 businesses in this sector. 78 people were employed in the tertiary sector, with 21 businesses in this sector.

In 2008 the total number of full-time equivalent jobs was 238. The number of jobs in the primary sector was 55, all of which were in agriculture. The number of jobs in the secondary sector was 118 of which 44 or (37.3%) were in manufacturing and 73 (61.9%) were in construction. The number of jobs in the tertiary sector was 65. In the tertiary sector; 6 or 9.2% were in wholesale or retail sales or the repair of motor vehicles, 20 or 30.8% were in the movement and storage of goods, 15 or 23.1% were in a hotel or restaurant, 5 or 7.7% were technical professionals or scientists, 6 or 9.2% were in education.

Of the working population, 4.3% used public transportation to get to work, and 60.3% used a private car.

== Education ==
The Canton of Fribourg school system provides one year of non-obligatory Kindergarten, followed by six years of Primary school. This is followed by three years of obligatory lower Secondary school where the students are separated according to ability and aptitude. Following the lower Secondary students may attend a three or four year optional upper Secondary school. The upper Secondary school is divided into gymnasium (university preparatory) and vocational programs. After they finish the upper Secondary program, students may choose to attend a Tertiary school or continue their apprenticeship.

During the 2010–11 school year, there were a total of 111 students attending 6 classes in Les Montets. A total of 184 students from the municipality attended any school, either in the municipality or outside of it. There were 2 kindergarten classes with a total of 37 students in the municipality. The municipality had 4 primary classes and 74 students. During the same year, there were no lower secondary classes in the municipality, but 37 students attended lower secondary school in a neighboring municipality. There were no upper Secondary classes or vocational classes, but there were 29 upper Secondary vocational students who attended classes in another municipality. The municipality had no non-university Tertiary classes, but there were 3 non-university Tertiary students and 3 specialized Tertiary students who attended classes in another municipality.
