= Cugy, Fribourg =

Cugy
- Municipality
- Flag Coat of arms
- Location of Cugy
- Location within Switzerland Location within Canton of Fribourg
- Coordinates: 46°49′N 6°53′E
- Country: Switzerland
- Canton: Fribourg
- District: Broye

Government
  - Mayor: Syndic

Area
  - Total: 9.91 km^{2} (3.83 sq mi)
- Elevation: 475 m (1,558 ft)

Population (December 2020)
  - Total: 1,847
  - Density: 186/km^{2} (483/sq mi)
- Time zone: UTC+01:00 (CET)
  - Summer (DST): UTC+02:00 (CEST)
- Postal code: 1482
- SFOS number: 2011
- ISO 3166 code: CH-FR
- Surrounded by: Bussy, Fétigny-Ménières, Les Montets, Payerne (VD)
- Website: cugy-fr.ch

Cugy (French: [kyʒi]; Arpitan: Cugi, locally Kudji [kyˈdʒi]) is a municipality in the district of Broye in the canton of Fribourg in Switzerland. On 1 January 2005 Cugy incorporated the formerly independent municipality of Vesin.

== History ==
Cugy is first mentioned around 968-85 as Cuzziaco.

== Geography ==
Cugy has an area, as of 2009, of 9.9 square kilometers (3.8 mi^{2}). Of this area, 6.92 km^{2} (2.67 mi^{2}) or 70.2% is used for agricultural purposes, while 1.92 km^{2} (0.74 mi^{2}) or 19.5% is forested. Of the rest of the land, 1.02 km^{2} (0.39 mi^{2}) or 10.3% is settled (buildings or roads) and 0.01 km^{2} (2.5 acres) or 0.1% is unproductive land.

Of the built up area, housing and buildings made up 4.9% and transportation infrastructure made up 4.1%. Out of the forested land, 18.1% of the total land area is heavily forested and 1.4% is covered with orchards or small clusters of trees. Of the agricultural land, 56.2% is used for growing crops and 12.8% is pastures, while 1.2% is used for orchards or vine crops.

The municipality is located in the Broye district, in the Estavayer-le-Lac exclave. It consists of the village of Cugy and the hamlets of Grange-des-Bois and Moulin de Glâne.

== Coat of arms ==
The blazon of the municipal coat of arms is Quartered, pally of eight Argent and Gules with a chief of the first, and pally of eight Or and Gules with on a Fess Argent three Roses Gules barbed and seeded proper.

== Demographics ==
Cugy has a population (as of December 2020) of 1,847. As of 2008, 12.0% of the population are resident foreign nationals. Over the last 10 years (2000–2010) the population has changed at a rate of 24.4%. Migration accounted for 18.4%, while births and deaths accounted for 5.1%.

Most of the population (as of 2000) speaks French (795 or 90.9%) as their first language, German is the second most common (29 or 3.3%) and Italian is the third (11 or 1.3%).

As of 2008, the population was 49.7% male and 50.3% female. The population was made up of 589 Swiss men (42.8% of the population) and 94 (6.8%) non-Swiss men. There were 605 Swiss women (44.0%) and 87 (6.3%) non-Swiss women. Of the population in the municipality, 337 or about 38.5% were born in Cugy and lived there in 2000. There were 229 or 26.2% who were born in the same canton, while 178 or 20.3% were born somewhere else in Switzerland, and 104 or 11.9% were born outside of Switzerland.

The age distribution, as of 2000, in Cugy is; 154 children or 13.8% of the population are between 0 and 9 years old and 138 teenagers or 12.4% are between 10 and 19. Of the adult population, 146 people or 13.1% of the population are between 20 and 29 years old. 171 people or 15.3% are between 30 and 39, 159 people or 14.2% are between 40 and 49, and 150 people or 13.4% are between 50 and 59. The senior population distribution is 91 people or 8.1% of the population are between 60 and 69 years old, 70 people or 6.3% are between 70 and 79, there are 33 people or 3.0% who are between 80 and 89, and there are 5 people or 0.4% who are 90 and older.

As of 2000, there were 356 people who were single and never married in the municipality. There were 429 married individuals, 56 widows or widowers and 34 individuals who are divorced.

As of 2000, there were 426 private households in the municipality, and an average of 2.6 persons per household. There were 95 households that consist of only one person and 35 households with five or more people. In 2000, a total of 329 apartments (85.7% of the total) were permanently occupied, while 39 apartments (10.2%) were seasonally occupied and 16 apartments (4.2%) were empty. As of 2009, the construction rate of new housing units was 5.7 new units per 1000 residents. The vacancy rate for the municipality, in 2010, was 0.34%.

The historical population is given in the following chart:

== Heritage sites of national significance ==
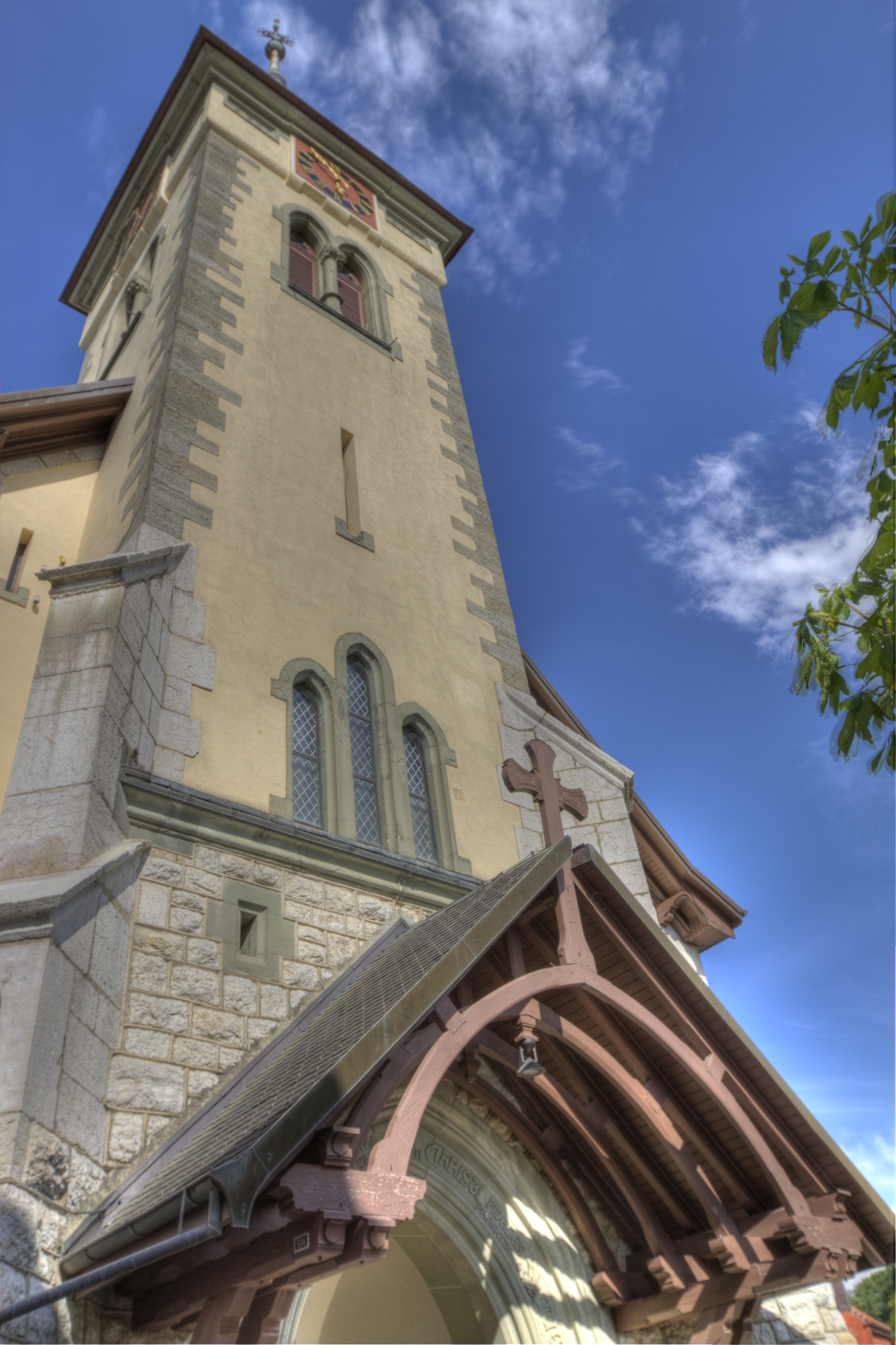
Church of Saint-Martin

The Saint-Martin Church is listed as a Swiss heritage site of national significance.

== Politics ==
In the 2011 federal election the most popular party was the CVP which received 25.4% of the vote. The next three most popular parties were the SVP (24.9%), the SP (20.9%) and the FDP (15.4%).

The CVP received about the same percentage of the vote as they did in the 2007 Federal election (28.3% in 2007 vs 25.4% in 2011). The SVP moved from third in 2007 (with 22.6%) to second in 2011, the SPS moved from fourth in 2007 (with 16.6%) to third and the FDP moved from second in 2007 (with 23.3%) to fourth. A total of 520 votes were cast in this election, of which 8 or 1.5% were invalid.

== Economy ==
As of 2010, Cugy had an unemployment rate of 1.8%. As of 2008, there were 120 people employed in the primary economic sector and about 30 businesses involved in this sector. 94 people were employed in the secondary sector and there were 12 businesses in this sector. 72 people were employed in the tertiary sector, with 28 businesses in this sector. There were 432 residents of the municipality who were employed in some capacity, of which females made up 43.1% of the workforce.

In 2008 the total number of full-time equivalent jobs was 225. The number of jobs in the primary sector was 83, all of which were in agriculture. The number of jobs in the secondary sector was 89 of which 62 or (69.7%) were in manufacturing and 27 (30.3%) were in construction. The number of jobs in the tertiary sector was 53. In the tertiary sector; 22 or 41.5% were in wholesale or retail sales or the repair of motor vehicles, 2 or 3.8% were in the movement and storage of goods, 4 or 7.5% were in a hotel or restaurant, 2 or 3.8% were the insurance or financial industry, 2 or 3.8% were technical professionals or scientists, 10 or 18.9% were in education and 1 was in health care.

In 2000, there were 67 workers who commuted into the municipality and 278 workers who commuted away. The municipality is a net exporter of workers, with about 4.1 workers leaving the municipality for every one entering. Of the working population, 5.8% used public transportation to get to work, and 65.9% used a private car.

== Religion ==
From the 2000 census, 679 or 77.6% were Roman Catholic, while 88 or 10.1% belonged to the Swiss Reformed Church. Of the rest of the population, there were 2 members of an Orthodox church (or about 0.23% of the population), there were 5 individuals (or about 0.57% of the population) who belonged to the Christian Catholic Church, and there were 13 individuals (or about 1.49% of the population) who belonged to another Christian church. There were 32 (or about 3.66% of the population) who were Islamic. 37 (or about 4.23% of the population) belonged to no church, are agnostic or atheist, and 24 individuals (or about 2.74% of the population) did not answer the question.

== Education ==
In Cugy about 331 or (37.8%) of the population have completed non-mandatory upper secondary education, and 57 or (6.5%) have completed additional higher education (either university or a Fachhochschule). Of the 57 who completed tertiary schooling, 70.2% were Swiss men, 21.1% were Swiss women.

The Canton of Fribourg school system provides one year of non-obligatory Kindergarten, followed by six years of Primary school. This is followed by three years of obligatory lower Secondary school where the students are separated according to ability and aptitude. Following the lower Secondary students may attend a three or four year optional upper Secondary school. The upper Secondary school is divided into gymnasium (university preparatory) and vocational programs. After they finish the upper Secondary program, students may choose to attend a Tertiary school or continue their apprenticeship.

During the 2010–11 school year, there were a total of 165 students attending 8 classes in Cugy. A total of 255 students from the municipality attended any school, either in the municipality or outside of it. There were 2 kindergarten classes with a total of 47 students in the municipality. The municipality had 6 primary classes with a total of 118 students. During the same year, there were no lower secondary classes in the municipality, but 57 students attended lower secondary school in a neighboring municipality. There were no upper Secondary classes or vocational classes, but there was one upper Secondary student and 29 upper Secondary vocational students who attended classes in another municipality. The municipality had no non-university Tertiary classes, but there were 2 non-university Tertiary students and one specialized Tertiary student who attended classes in another municipality.

As of 2000, there were 26 students in Cugy who came from another municipality, while 78 residents attended schools outside the municipality.

== Transportation ==
The municipality has a railway station, Cugy FR, on the Fribourg–Yverdon line. It has regular service to Fribourg/Freiburg and Yverdon-les-Bains.
