= Estavayer-le-Lac =

- Former municipality
- Old City of Estavayer-le-Lac

- Coat of arms
- Location of Estavayer-le-Lac
- Location within Switzerland Location within Canton of Fribourg
- Coordinates: 46°51′00″N 6°50′50″E
- Country: Switzerland
- Canton: Fribourg
- District: Broye

Government
  - Mayor: Albert Bachmann

Area
  - Total: 6.41 km^{2} (2.47 sq mi)
- Elevation: 459 m (1,506 ft)
- Highest elevation: 489 m (1,604 ft)
- Lowest elevation (Lake Neuchâtel): 429 m (1,407 ft)

Population (December 2020)
  - Total: 6,208
  - Density: 968/km^{2} (2,510/sq mi)
- Time zone: UTC+01:00 (CET)
  - Summer (DST): UTC+02:00 (CEST)
- Postal code: 1470
- SFOS number: 2015
- ISO 3166 code: CH-FR
- Surrounded by: Autavaux, Font, Gorgier (NE), Les Montets, Lully, Montbrelloz, Saint-Aubin-Sauges (NE), Sévaz, Vaumarcus (NE)
- Website: estavayer-le-lac.ch

Estavayer-le-Lac (French: [ɛstavaje l(ə) lak]; Arpitan: Estavalyér-le-Lèc, locally Thavalyi-le-Lé [θavaˈʎi lə ˈle]) is a historical town and former Swiss municipality of the canton of Fribourg, situated on the south shore of Lake Neuchâtel. Estavayer-le-Lac is located between Yverdon and Bern. It is the capital of the district of Broye. The municipality of Font merged on 1 January 2012 into the municipality of Estavayer-le-Lac. On 1 January 2017 Bussy, Morens, Murist, Rueyres-les-Prés, Vernay and Vuissens merged into the new municipality of Estavayer.

== Geography ==
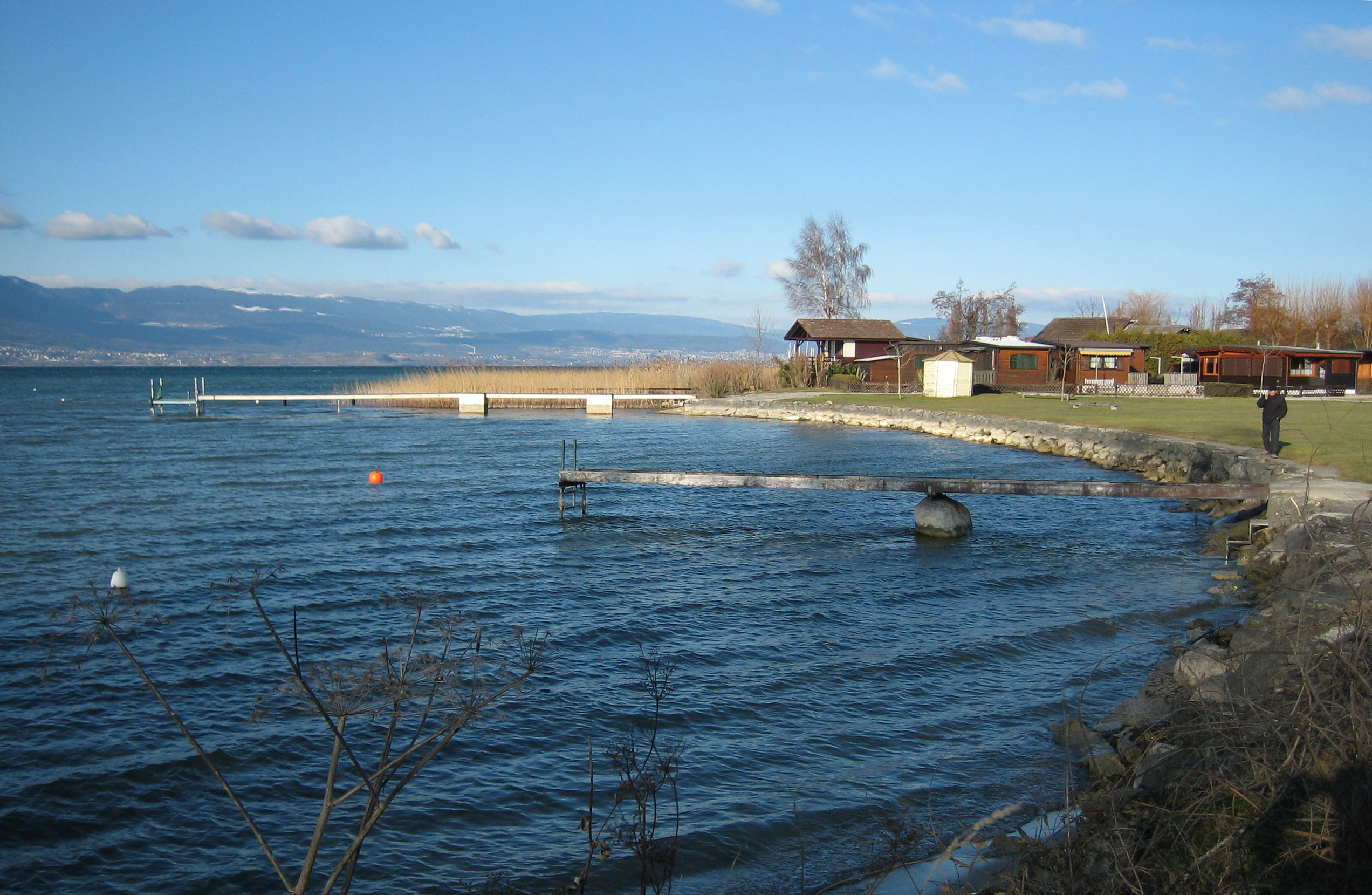
Lake front at Estavayer-le-Lac

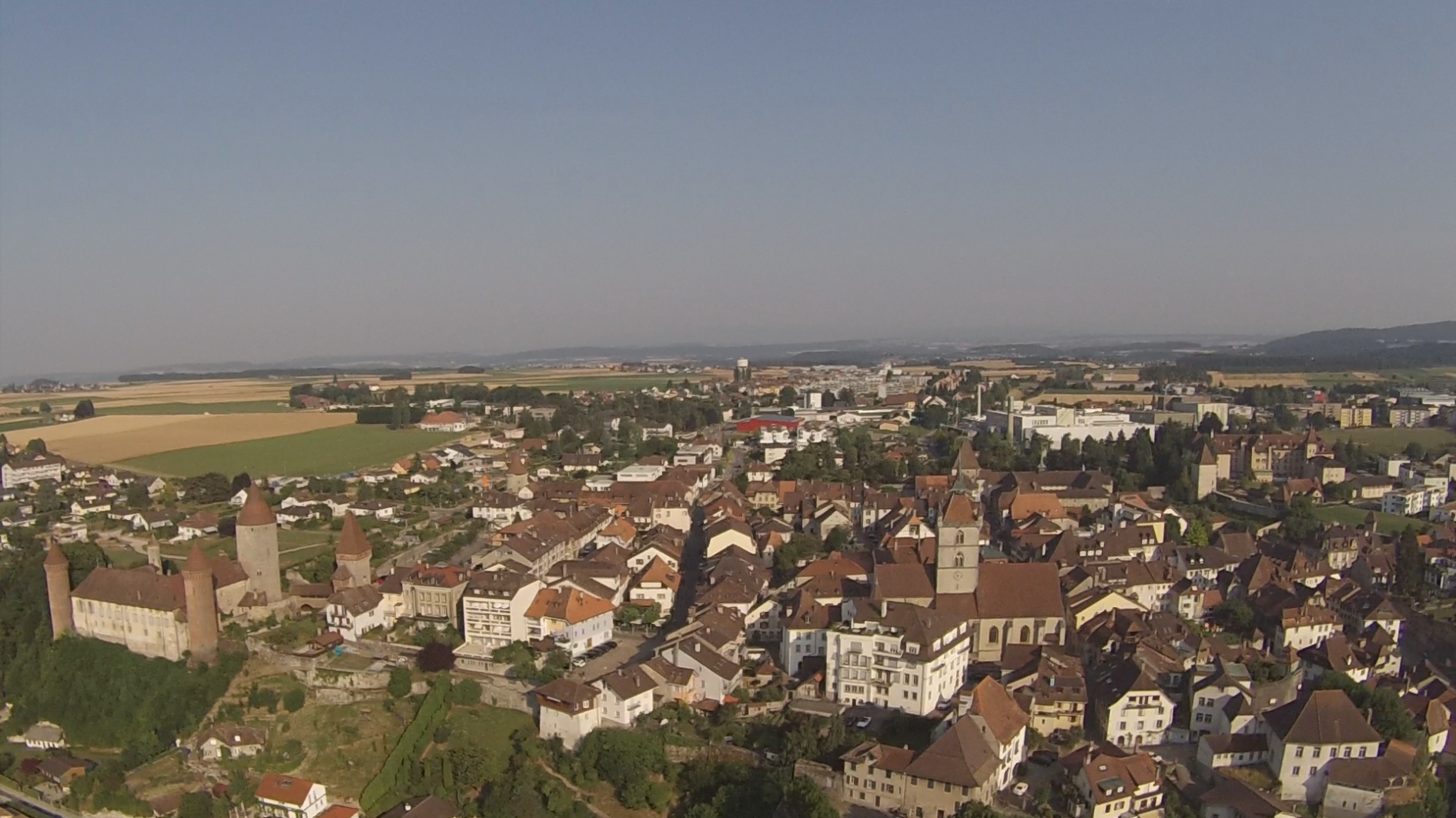
Aerial view of Estavayer-le-Lac (2015)

Aerial view (1964)

Estavayer-le-Lac has an area, as of 2009, of 6.4 square kilometers (2.5 mi^{2}). Of this area, 3.57 km^{2} (1.38 mi^{2}) or 55.9% is used for agricultural purposes, while 0.39 km^{2} (0.15 mi^{2}) or 6.1% is forested. Of the rest of the land, 2.14 km^{2} (0.83 mi^{2}) or 33.5% is settled (buildings or roads), 0.02 km^{2} (4.9 acres) or 0.3% is either rivers or lakes and 0.3 km^{2} (0.12 mi^{2}) or 4.7% is unproductive land. Following the 2012 merger of Font, the total area increased to 8.9 square kilometers (3.4 mi^{2}).

Of the built up area, industrial buildings made up 4.7% of the total area while housing and buildings made up 16.0% and transportation infrastructure made up 7.8%. while parks, green belts and sports fields made up 4.4%. Out of the forested land, 4.5% of the total land area is heavily forested and 1.6% is covered with orchards or small clusters of trees. Of the agricultural land, 46.9% is used for growing crops and 8.1% is pastures. All the water in the municipality is in lakes.

The municipality is located in the Broye district, on the southern bank of Lake Neuchatel at an elevation of 430 to 460 meters (1,410 to 1,510 ft). It is a district capital and a regional administration and business center.

== Coat of arms ==
The blazon of the municipal coat of arms is Per pale Gules and Argent three bars wavy of the first, overall a double rose of the first barbed and seeded proper.

== Demographics ==
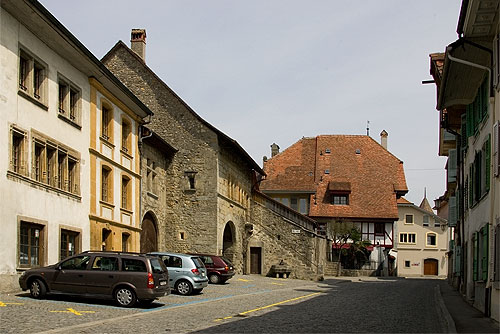
Old city of Estavayer-le-Lac

Estavayer-le-Lac has a population (as of December 2020) of 6,208. As of 2008, 25.9% of the population are resident foreign nationals. Over the last 10 years (2000–2010) the population has changed at a rate of 19.5%. Migration accounted for 14.7%, while births and deaths accounted for 2.5%.

Most of the population (as of 2000) speaks French (3,602 or 81.2%) as their first language, German is the second most common (256 or 5.8%) and Albanian is the third (165 or 3.7%). There are 46 people who speak Italian and 2 people who speak Romansh.

As of 2008, the population was 47.9% male and 52.1% female. The population was made up of 1,699 Swiss men (32.9% of the population) and 774 (15.0%) non-Swiss men. There were 1,979 Swiss women (38.3%) and 710 (13.8%) non-Swiss women. Of the population in the municipality, 1,289 or about 29.1% were born in Estavayer-le-Lac and lived there in 2000. There were 983 or 22.2% who were born in the same canton, while 893 or 20.1% were born somewhere else in Switzerland, and 1,029 or 23.2% were born outside of Switzerland.

The age distribution, as of 2000, in Estavayer-le-Lac is; 590 children or 13.3% of the population are between 0 and 9 years old and 685 teenagers or 15.4% are between 10 and 19. Of the adult population, 525 people or 11.8% of the population are between 20 and 29 years old. 712 people or 16.0% are between 30 and 39, 637 people or 14.4% are between 40 and 49, and 513 people or 11.6% are between 50 and 59. The senior population distribution is 336 people or 7.6% of the population are between 60 and 69 years old, 270 people or 6.1% are between 70 and 79, there are 143 people or 3.2% who are between 80 and 89, and there are 26 people or 0.6% who are 90 and older.

As of 2000, there were 2,001 people who were single and never married in the municipality. There were 1,961 married individuals, 243 widows or widowers and 232 individuals who are divorced.

As of 2000, there were 1,737 private households in the municipality, and an average of 2.3 persons per household. There were 626 households that consist of only one person and 149 households with five or more people. In 2000, a total of 1,673 apartments (80.7% of the total) were permanently occupied, while 304 apartments (14.7%) were seasonally occupied and 96 apartments (4.6%) were empty. As of 2009, the construction rate of new housing units was 8.5 new units per 1000 residents. The vacancy rate for the municipality, in 2010, was 0.45%.

The historical population is given in the following chart:

== Heritage sites of national significance ==
The De Rivaz Chapel, the Sacré-Coeur Chapel, the Chenaux Castle, the Collegiate church of Saint-Laurent, the Convent of the Dominican nuns, the town fortifications, the House de la Dîme and the House des Sires d’Estavayer listed as Swiss heritage site of national significance. The entire town of Estavayer-le-Lac is part of the Inventory of Swiss Heritage Sites. From the 2012 merger of Font into Estavayer-le-Lac, the Gallo-Roman villa at La Vuardaz and the entire Font area (shared between Châbles and Font) were added.

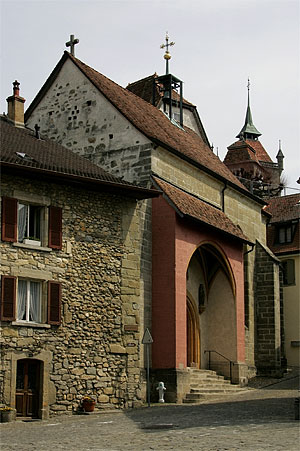
De Rivaz Chapel

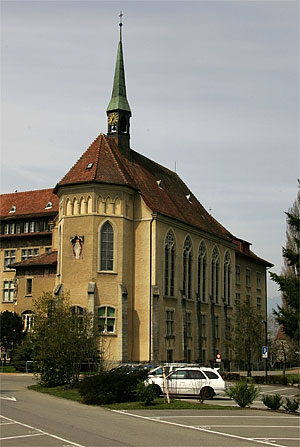
Sacré-Coeur Chapel

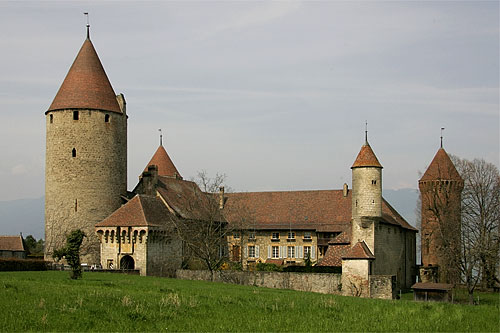
Chenaux Castle

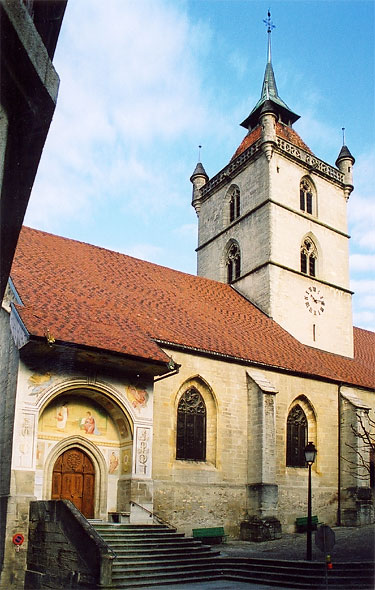
Collegiate church of Saint-Laurent

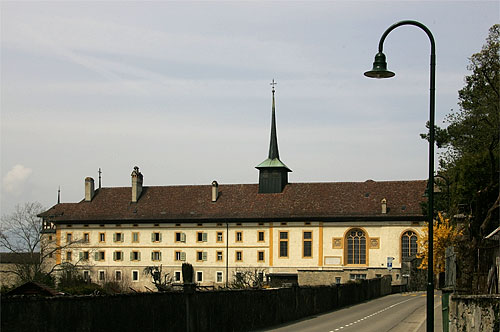
Convent of the Dominican

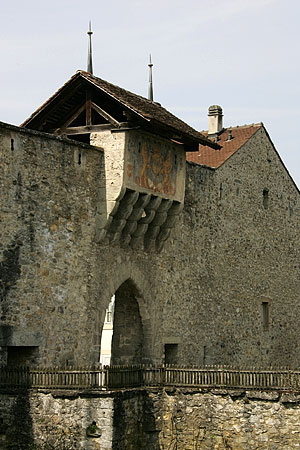
Fortifications

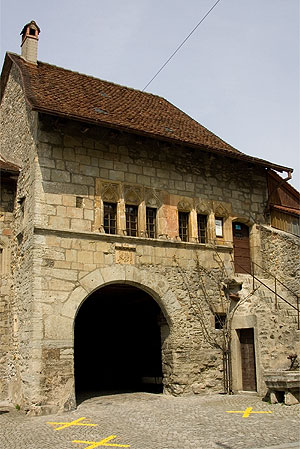
House de la Dîme

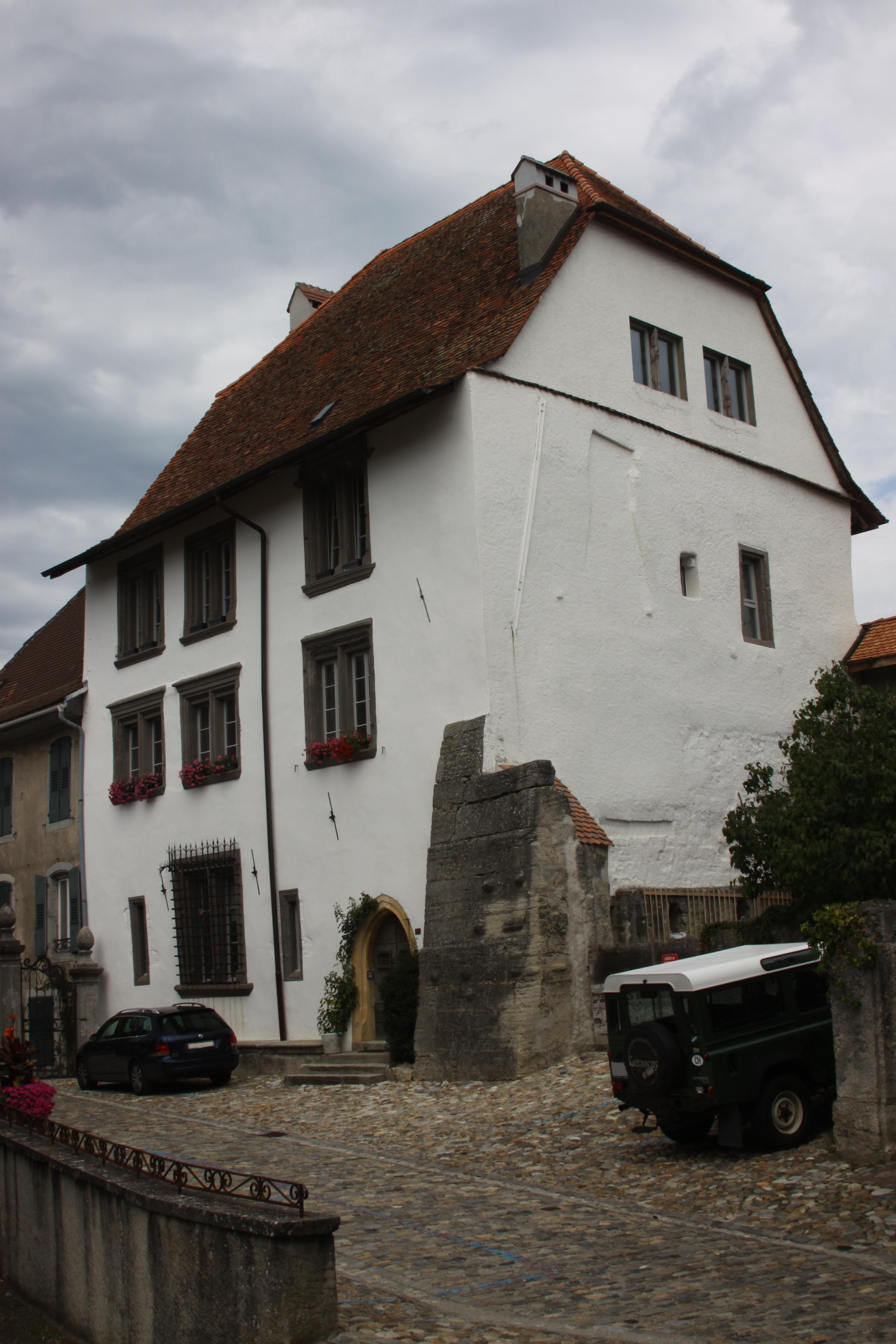
House des Sires d’Estavayer

== Politics ==
In the 2011 federal election the most popular party was the CVP which received 29.7% of the vote. The next three most popular parties were the SP (25.0%), the SVP (18.5%) and the FDP (12.8%). The CVP received about the same percentage of the vote as they did in the 2007 Federal election (31.7% in 2007 vs 29.7% in 2011). The SPS moved from third in 2007 (with 20.5%) to second in 2011, the SVP moved from second in 2007 (with 23.6%) to third and the FDP gained popularity (13.5% in 2007). A total of 1,372 votes were cast in this election, of which 16 or 1.2% were invalid.

== Economy ==
As of 2010, Estavayer-le-Lac had an unemployment rate of 3.9%. As of 2008, there were 28 people employed in the primary economic sector and about 10 businesses involved in this sector. 1,343 people were employed in the secondary sector and there were 62 businesses in this sector. 1,537 people were employed in the tertiary sector, with 187 businesses in this sector. There were 2,066 residents of the municipality who were employed in some capacity, of which females made up 43.9% of the workforce.

In 2008 the total number of full-time equivalent jobs was 2,496. The number of jobs in the primary sector was 23, of which 18 were in agriculture and 5 were in forestry or lumber production. The number of jobs in the secondary sector was 1,299 of which 1,056 or (81.3%) were in manufacturing, 1 was in mining and 238 (18.3%) were in construction. The number of jobs in the tertiary sector was 1,174. In the tertiary sector; 247 or 21.0% were in wholesale or retail sales or the repair of motor vehicles, 59 or 5.0% were in the movement and storage of goods, 87 or 7.4% were in a hotel or restaurant, 12 or 1.0% were in the information industry, 51 or 4.3% were the insurance or financial industry, 92 or 7.8% were technical professionals or scientists, 142 or 12.1% were in education and 376 or 32.0% were in health care.

In 2000, there were 1,495 workers who commuted into the municipality and 812 workers who commuted away. The municipality is a net importer of workers, with about 1.8 workers entering the municipality for every one leaving. Of the working population, 6% used public transportation to get to work, and 58% used a private car.

== Religion ==
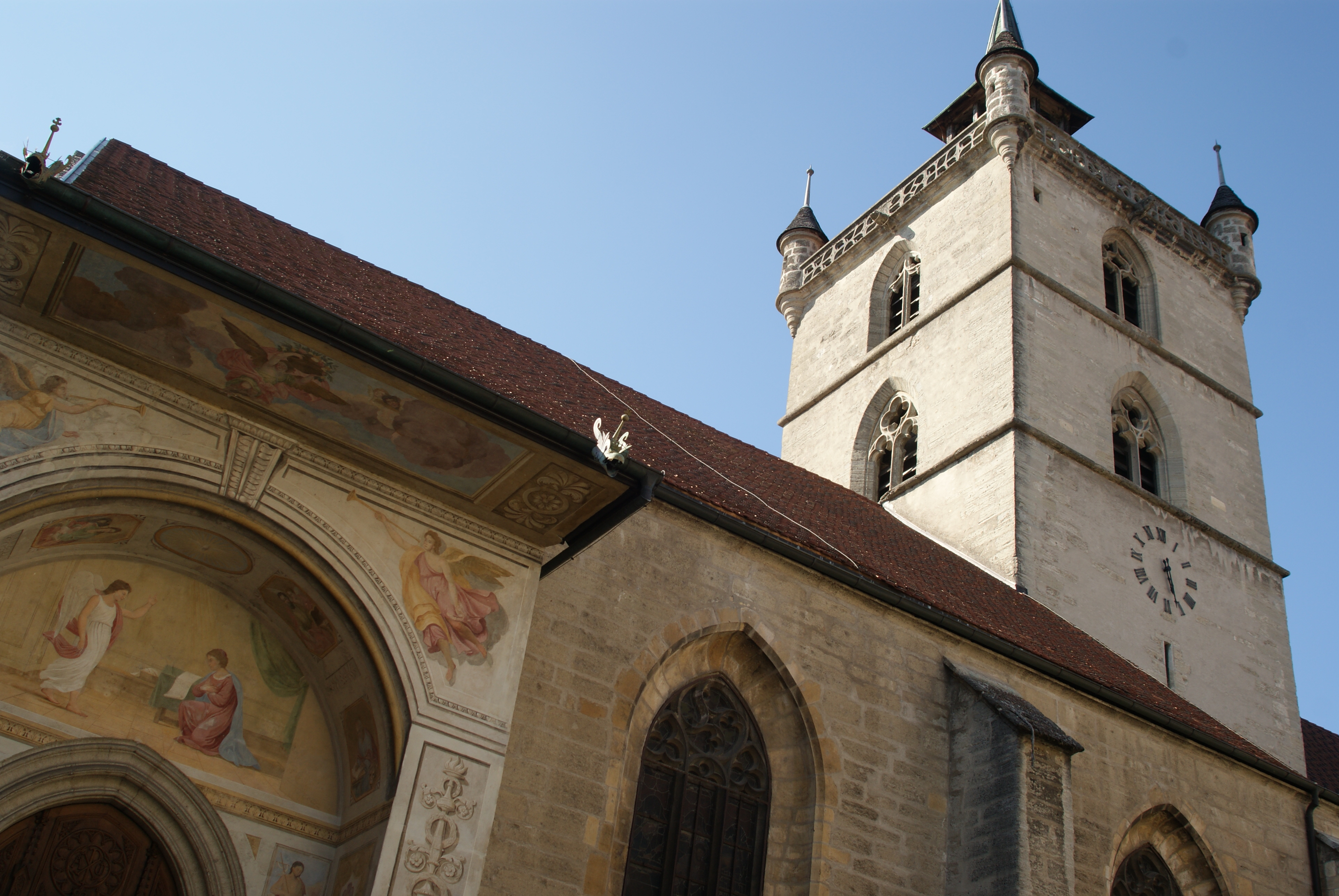
Collegiate church of Saint-Laurent

From the 2000 census, 2,853 or 64.3% were Roman Catholic, while 533 or 12.0% belonged to the Swiss Reformed Church. Of the rest of the population, there were 54 members of an Orthodox church (or about 1.22% of the population), there were 6 individuals (or about 0.14% of the population) who belonged to the Christian Catholic Church, and there were 131 individuals (or about 2.95% of the population) who belonged to another Christian church. There were 2 individuals (or about 0.05% of the population) who were Jewish, and 299 (or about 6.74% of the population) who were Islamic. There were 5 individuals who were Buddhist, 3 individuals who were Hindu and 3 individuals who belonged to another church. 297 (or about 6.69% of the population) belonged to no church, are agnostic or atheist, and 315 individuals (or about 7.10% of the population) did not answer the question.

== Education ==
In Estavayer-le-Lac about 1,339 or (30.2%) of the population have completed non-mandatory upper secondary education, and 451 or (10.2%) have completed additional higher education (either university or a Fachhochschule). Of the 451 who completed tertiary schooling, 60.8% were Swiss men, 22.6% were Swiss women, 7.8% were non-Swiss men and 8.9% were non-Swiss women.

The Canton of Fribourg school system provides one year of non-obligatory Kindergarten, followed by six years of Primary school. This is followed by three years of obligatory lower Secondary school where the students are separated according to ability and aptitude. Following the lower Secondary students may attend a three or four year optional upper Secondary school. The upper Secondary school is divided into gymnasium (university preparatory) and vocational programs. After they finish the upper Secondary program, students may choose to attend a Tertiary school or continue their apprenticeship.

During the 2010–11 school year, there were a total of 1,276 students attending 72 classes in Estavayer-le-Lac. A total of 895 students from the municipality attended any school, either in the municipality or outside of it. There were 6 kindergarten classes with a total of 110 students in the municipality. The municipality had 18 primary classes and 377 students. During the same year, there were 33 lower secondary classes with a total of 683 students. There were 2 upper Secondary classes, with 33 upper Secondary students. The municipality had 13 special Tertiary classes, with 73 specialized Tertiary students.

As of 2000, there were 440 students in Estavayer-le-Lac who came from another municipality, while 145 residents attended schools outside the municipality.

== Famous citizens ==
- Franz Wilhelm (1884–1968) a Swiss fencer, competed in the team épée event at the 1920 Summer Olympics
- Léon Savary (1895–1968) Swiss journalist and author, buried in Estavayer-Le-Lac
- Jan Balet (1913–2009) a German/US-American painter, graphic artist and illustrator
- Gabriel Bullet (1921–2011) a Swiss prelate of the Roman Catholic Church
- Jean-Claude Périsset (born 1939) Archbishop, Apostolic Nuncio to Germany
- Thérèse Meyer (born 1948) a Swiss politician, Mayor of Estavayer-le-Lac 1991
