= Font, Switzerland =

Font
- Former municipality
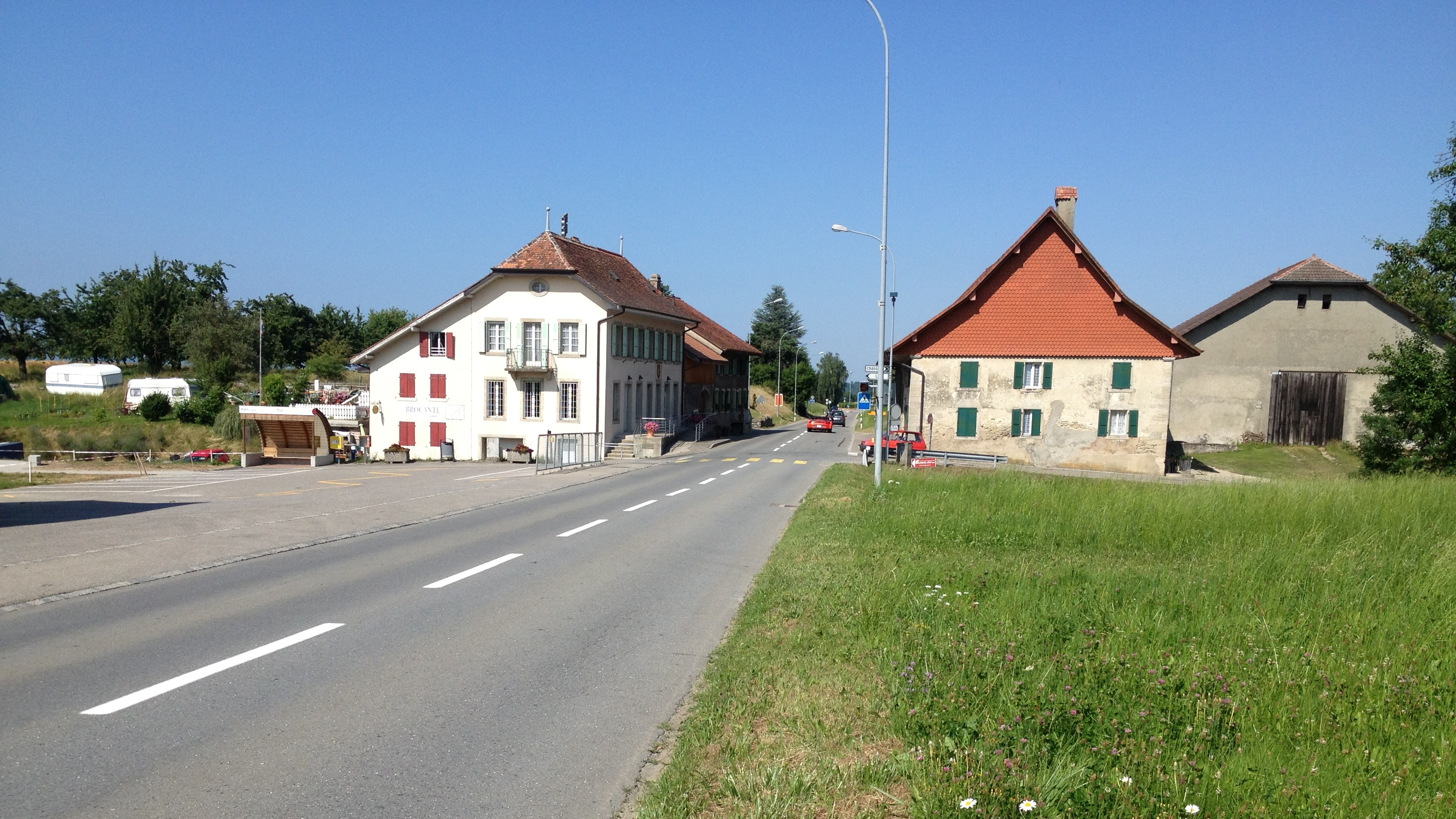

- Coat of arms
- Location of Font
- Location within Switzerland Location within Canton of Fribourg
- Coordinates: 46°50′N 6°49′E
- Country: Switzerland
- Canton: Fribourg
- District: Broye

Area
  - Total: 2.52 km^{2} (0.97 sq mi)
- Elevation: 462 m (1,516 ft)

Population (December 2020)
  - Total: 359
  - Density: 142/km^{2} (369/sq mi)
- Time zone: UTC+01:00 (CET)
  - Summer (DST): UTC+02:00 (CEST)
- Postal code: 1473
- SFOS number: 2017
- ISO 3166 code: CH-FR
- Surrounded by: Bollion, Châbles, Châtillon, Estavayer-le-Lac, Lully, Seiry, Vaumarcus (NE)
- Website: font.ch

Font is a former municipality in the district of Broye, in the canton of Fribourg, Switzerland. The municipality of Font merged on 1 January 2012 into the municipality of Estavayer-le-Lac.

== History ==
Font is first mentioned in 1011.

== Geography ==
Font has an area, as of 2009, of 2.5 square kilometers (0.97 mi^{2}). Of this area, 1.3 km^{2} (0.50 mi^{2}) or 52.0% is used for agricultural purposes, while 0.67 km^{2} (0.26 mi^{2}) or 26.8% is forested. Of the rest of the land, 0.37 km^{2} (0.14 mi^{2}) or 14.8% is settled (buildings or roads), 0.01 km^{2} (2.5 acres) or 0.4% is either rivers or lakes and 0.16 km^{2} (0.062 mi^{2}) or 6.4% is unproductive land.

Of the built up area, housing and buildings made up 6.0% and transportation infrastructure made up 8.0%. Out of the forested land, 24.8% of the total land area is heavily forested and 2.0% is covered with orchards or small clusters of trees. Of the agricultural land, 39.2% is used for growing crops and 10.4% is pastures, while 2.4% is used for orchards or vine crops. All the water in the municipality is in lakes.

The municipality is located in the Broye district, in the Estavayer-le-Lac exclave. It lies on the southern shore area of Lake Neuchâtel, and borders the municipalities of Châtillon coming from center onto the west, Châbles to the west, Estavayer-le-Lac to the east, and Lully to the south and southeast. The town's main road is the Yverdon-les-Bains Route and the A1 motorway which travels south of the city through Châtillon.

== Coat of arms ==
The blazon of the municipal coat of arms is Gules, a Mullet Argent pierced.

== Demographics ==
Font has a population (as of December 2020) of 359. As of 2008, 7.0% of the population are resident foreign nationals. Over the last 10 years (2000–2010) the population has changed at a rate of 31%. Migration accounted for 23.5%, while births and deaths accounted for 5.6%.

Most of the population (as of 2000) speaks French (253 or 94.8%) as their first language, German is the second most common (13 or 4.9%) and Italian is the third (1 or 0.4%).

As of 2008, the population was 52.8% male and 47.2% female. The population was made up of 168 Swiss men (49.6% of the population) and 11 (3.2%) non-Swiss men. There were 150 Swiss women (44.2%) and 10 (2.9%) non-Swiss women. Of the population in the municipality, 99 or about 37.1% were born in Font and lived there in 2000. There were 93 or 34.8% who were born in the same canton, while 63 or 23.6% were born somewhere else in Switzerland, and 7 or 2.6% were born outside of Switzerland.

The age distribution, as of 2000, in Font is; 38 children or 14.2% of the population are between 0 and 9 years old and 26 teenagers or 9.7% are between 10 and 19. Of the adult population, 25 people or 9.4% of the population are between 20 and 29 years old. 45 people or 16.9% are between 30 and 39, 50 people or 18.7% are between 40 and 49, and 33 people or 12.4% are between 50 and 59. The senior population distribution is 22 people or 8.2% of the population are between 60 and 69 years old, 19 people or 7.1% are between 70 and 79, there are 8 people or 3.0% who are between 80 and 89, and there is 1 person who is 90 and older.

As of 2000, there were 90 people who were single and never married in the municipality. There were 147 married individuals, 18 widows or widowers and 12 individuals who are divorced.

As of 2000, there were 103 private households in the municipality, and an average of 2.6 persons per household. There were 26 households that consist of only one person and 9 households with five or more people. In 2000, a total of 96 apartments (55.8% of the total) were permanently occupied, while 64 apartments (37.2%) were seasonally occupied and 12 apartments (7.0%) were empty. As of 2009, the construction rate of new housing units was 2.8 new units per 1000 residents. The vacancy rate for the municipality, in 2010, was 0.52%.

Historical population

Year	Pop.	±% p.a.
1811	207	—
1850	233	+0.30%
1860	262	+1.18%
1870	227	−1.42%
1880	222	−0.22%
1888	231	+0.50%

Year	Pop.	±% p.a.
1900	206	−0.95%
1910	218	+0.57%
1920	219	+0.05%
1930	208	−0.51%
1941	228	+0.84%
1950	237	+0.43%

Year	Pop.	±% p.a.
1960	219	−0.79%
1970	203	−0.76%
1980	192	−0.56%
1990	231	+1.87%
2000	267	+1.46%

== Heritage sites of national significance ==
The Gallo-Roman villa at La Vuardaz is listed as a Swiss heritage site of national significance. The entire Font area (shared between Châbles and Font) is part of the Inventory of Swiss Heritage Sites.

== Politics ==
In the 2011 federal election the most popular party was the SP which received 36.9% of the vote. The next three most popular parties were the CVP (32.2%), the SVP (19.0%) and the FDP (3.8%).

The SPS gained an additional 8.0% of the vote from the 2007 Federal election. The CVP retained about the same popularity (28.7% in 2007), the SVP retained about the same popularity (20.0% in 2007) and the FDP lost popularity (10.2% in 2007). A total of 164 votes were cast in this election, of which 1 or 0.6% was invalid.

== Economy ==
As of 2010, Font had an unemployment rate of 1.6%. As of 2008, there were 11 people employed in the primary economic sector and about 5 businesses involved in this sector. 3 people were employed in the secondary sector and there were 2 businesses in this sector. 30 people were employed in the tertiary sector, with 9 businesses in this sector. There were 138 residents of the municipality who were employed in some capacity, of which females made up 40.6% of the workforce.

In 2008 the total number of full-time equivalent jobs was 31. The number of jobs in the primary sector was 7, of which 6 were in agriculture and 1 was in fishing or fisheries. The number of jobs in the secondary sector was 3, all of which were in construction. The number of jobs in the tertiary sector was 21. In the tertiary sector; 2 or 9.5% were in the sale or repair of motor vehicles, 2 or 9.5% were in a hotel or restaurant, 5 or 23.8% were in the information industry, 2 or 9.5% were in education.

In 2000, there were 8 workers who commuted into the municipality and 109 workers who commuted away. The municipality is a net exporter of workers, with about 13.6 workers leaving the municipality for every one entering. Of the working population, 3.6% used public transportation to get to work, and 75.4% used a private car.

== Religion ==
From the 2000 census, 198 or 74.2% were Roman Catholic, while 35 or 13.1% belonged to the Swiss Reformed Church. Of the rest of the population, there was 1 individual who belongs to another Christian church. 25 (or about 9.36% of the population) belonged to no church, are agnostic or atheist, and 8 individuals (or about 3.00% of the population) did not answer the question.

== Education ==
In Font about 99 or (37.1%) of the population have completed non-mandatory upper secondary education, and 39 or (14.6%) have completed additional higher education (either university or a Fachhochschule). Of the 39 who completed tertiary schooling, 64.1% were Swiss men, 35.9% were Swiss women.

The Canton of Fribourg school system provides one year of non-obligatory Kindergarten, followed by six years of Primary school. This is followed by three years of obligatory lower Secondary school where the students are separated according to ability and aptitude. Following the lower Secondary students may attend a three or four year optional upper Secondary school. The upper Secondary school is divided into gymnasium (university preparatory) and vocational programs. After they finish the upper Secondary program, students may choose to attend a Tertiary school or continue their apprenticeship.

During the 2010–11 school year, there were a total of 46 students attending 2 classes in Font. A total of 62 students from the municipality attended any school, either in the municipality or outside of it. There were no kindergarten classes in the municipality, but 10 students attended kindergarten in a neighboring municipality. The municipality had 2 primary classes and 46 students. During the same year, there were no lower secondary classes in the municipality, but 14 students attended lower secondary school in a neighboring municipality. There were no upper Secondary classes or vocational classes, but there was one upper Secondary student and 4 upper Secondary vocational students who attended classes in another municipality. The municipality had no non-university Tertiary classes, but there was one specialized Tertiary student who attended classes in another municipality.

As of 2000, there were 38 students in Font who came from another municipality, while 34 residents attended schools outside the municipality.
