= Cheyres-Châbles =

- Municipality
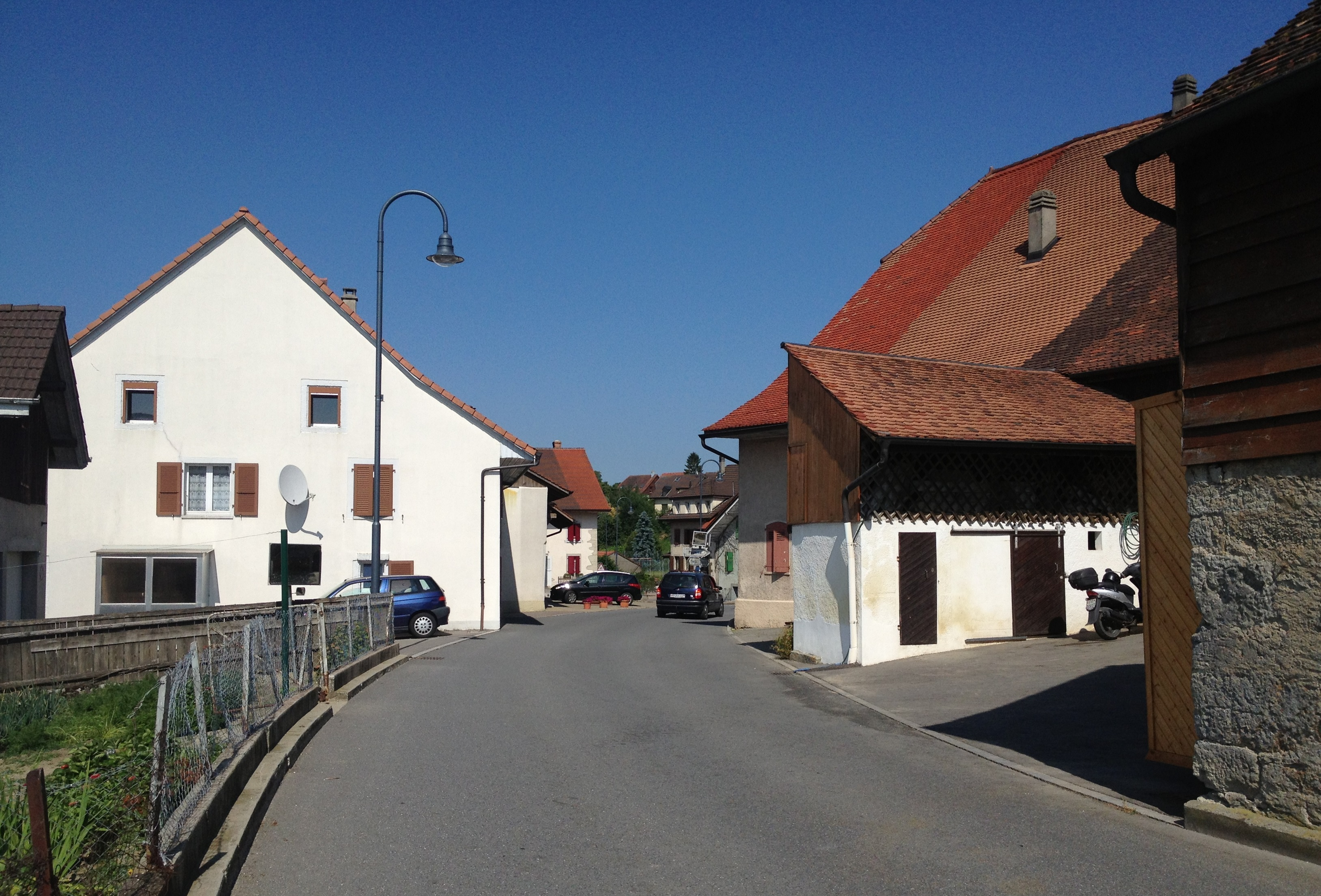

- Flag Coat of arms
- Location of Cheyres-Châbles
- Location within Switzerland Location within Canton of Fribourg
- Coordinates: 46°50′N 6°48′E
- Country: Switzerland
- Canton: Fribourg
- District: Broye

Government
  - Mayor: Syndic

Area
  - Total: 9.87 km^{2} (3.81 sq mi)

Population (Dec 2015)
  - Total: 2,180
  - Density: 221/km^{2} (572/sq mi)
- Time zone: UTC+01:00 (CET)
  - Summer (DST): UTC+02:00 (CEST)
- Postal code: 1474, 1468
- SFOS number: 2055
- ISO 3166 code: CH-FR
- Surrounded by: Bollion, Châtillon, Concise (VD), Font, Murist, Vaumarcus (NE)
- Website: http://www.cheyres-chables.ch SFSO statistics

Cheyres-Châbles (French pronunciation: [ʃɛʁ ʃabl]) is a municipality in the district of Broye in the canton of Fribourg in Switzerland. On 1 January 2017 the former municipalities of Châbles and Cheyres merged into the new municipality of Cheyres-Châbles.

== History ==
=== Cheyres ===
Cheyres is first mentioned in 1230 as Cheres.

== Geography ==
Cheyres-Châbles has an area, as of 2009, of 9.74 km^{2} (3.76 sq mi).

== Demographics ==
The new municipality has a population (as of December 2020) of 2,320.

== Historic Population ==
The historical population is given in the following chart:

== Sights ==
The entire Font region (shared between Châbles and Font) is designated as part of the Inventory of Swiss Heritage Sites.
