= Châbles =

- Former municipality
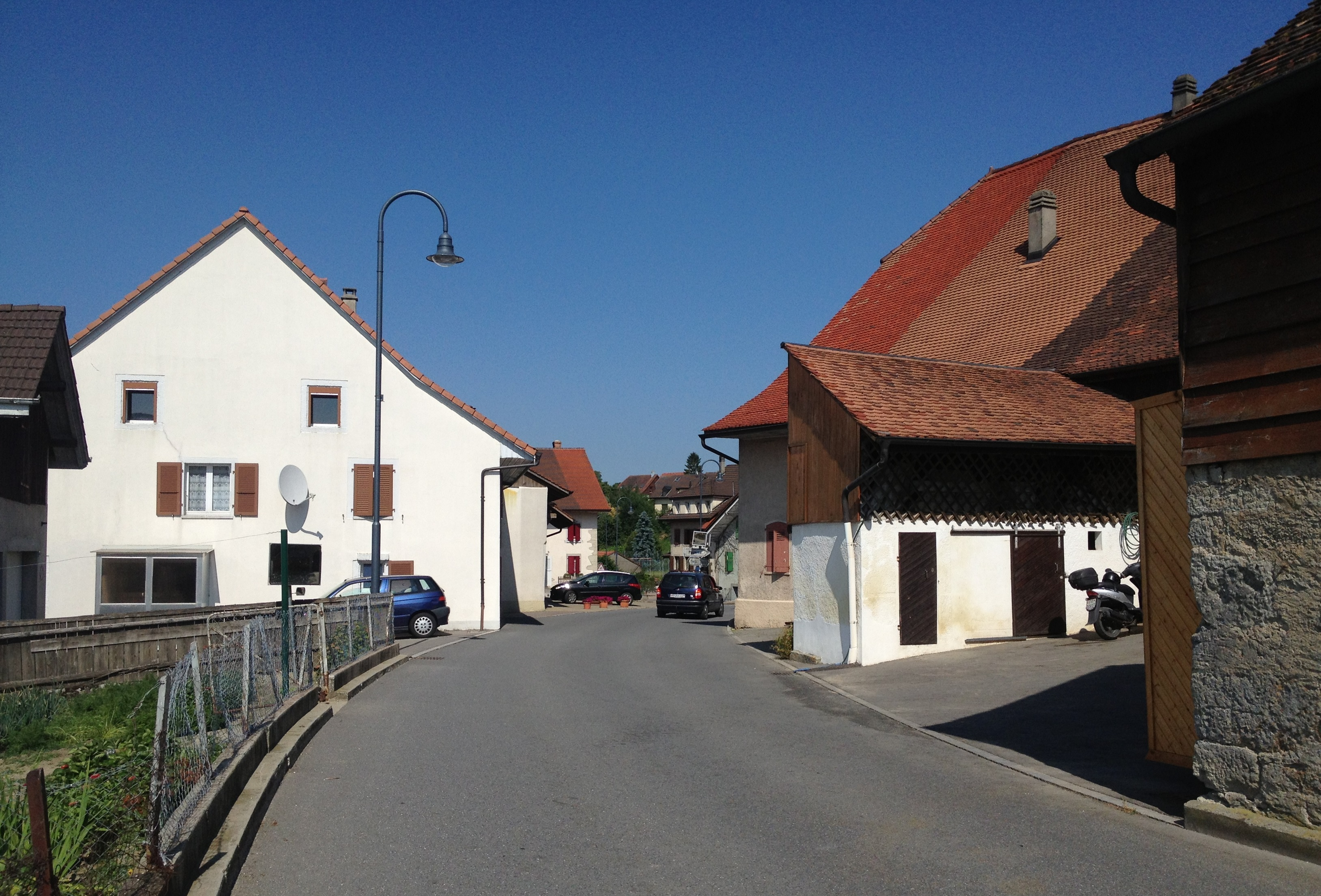

- Coat of arms
- Location of Châbles
- Location within Switzerland Location within Canton of Fribourg
- Coordinates: 46°50′N 6°48′E
- Country: Switzerland
- Canton: Fribourg
- District: Broye

Government
  - Mayor: Syndic

Area
  - Total: 4.70 km^{2} (1.81 sq mi)
- Elevation: 571 m (1,873 ft)

Population (December 2020)
  - Total: 769
  - Density: 164/km^{2} (424/sq mi)
- Time zone: UTC+01:00 (CET)
  - Summer (DST): UTC+02:00 (CEST)
- Postal code: 1474
- SFOS number: 2005
- ISO 3166 code: CH-FR
- Surrounded by: Bollion, Châtillon, Cheyres, Concise (VD), Font, Murist, Vaumarcus (NE)
- Website: chables.ch

Châbles (French: [ʃɑbl]; Arpitan: Châbllos, locally Tsâbyo [ˈtsɑbjo]) is a former municipality in the district of Broye in the canton of Fribourg in Switzerland. On 1 January 2017 the former municipalities of Châbles and Cheyres merged into the new municipality of Cheyres-Châbles.

== Geography ==
Aerial view (1964)

Châbles has an area, as of 2009, of 4.7 square kilometers (1.8 mi^{2}). Of this area, 2.47 km^{2} (0.95 mi^{2}) or 52.1% is used for agricultural purposes, while 1.34 km^{2} (0.52 mi^{2}) or 28.3% is forested. Of the rest of the land, 0.45 km^{2} (0.17 mi^{2}) or 9.5% is settled (buildings or roads), 0.01 km^{2} (2.5 acres) or 0.2% is either rivers or lakes and 0.5 km^{2} (0.19 mi^{2}) or 10.5% is unproductive land.

Of the built up area, housing and buildings made up 5.1% and transportation infrastructure made up 3.6%. Out of the forested land, 26.8% of the total land area is heavily forested and 1.5% is covered with orchards or small clusters of trees. Of the agricultural land, 38.6% is used for growing crops and 11.2% is pastures, while 2.3% is used for orchards or vine crops. All the water in the municipality is in lakes.

The municipality is located in the Broye district near Lake Neuchatel.

The municipalities of Châbles, Cheyres, Murist, Nuvilly and Vuissens are considering a merger on at a date in the future into the new municipality with an, as of 2011, undetermined name.

== Coat of arms ==
The blazon of the municipal coat of arms is Gules, a Tower embattled Argent masoned and windowed Sable between two Mullets of the same pierced, and in base coupeaux Vert.

== Demographics ==
Châbles has a population (as of December 2020) of 769. As of 2008, 12.6% of the population are resident foreign nationals. Over the last 10 years (2000–2010) the population has changed at a rate of 41.5%. Migration accounted for 34.9%, while births and deaths accounted for 9.4%.

Most of the population (as of 2000) speaks French (426 or 86.8%) as their first language, German is the second most common (50 or 10.2%) and Spanish is the third (5 or 1.0%). There are 3 people who speak Italian and 1 person who speaks Romansh.

As of 2008, the population was 48.1% male and 51.9% female. The population was made up of 268 Swiss men (40.8% of the population) and 48 (7.3%) non-Swiss men. There were 290 Swiss women (44.1%) and 51 (7.8%) non-Swiss women.

Of the population in the municipality, 142 or about 28.9% were born in Châbles and lived there in 2000. There were 128 or 26.1% who were born in the same canton, while 152 or 31.0% were born somewhere else in Switzerland, and 60 or 12.2% were born outside of Switzerland.

The age distribution, as of 2000, in Châbles is; 78 children or 15.9% of the population are between 0 and 9 years old and 51 teenagers or 10.4% are between 10 and 19. Of the adult population, 49 people or 10.0% of the population are between 20 and 29 years old. 91 people or 18.5% are between 30 and 39, 73 people or 14.9% are between 40 and 49, and 56 people or 11.4% are between 50 and 59. The senior population distribution is 33 people or 6.7% of the population are between 60 and 69 years old, 32 people or 6.5% are between 70 and 79, there are 26 people or 5.3% who are between 80 and 89, and there are 2 people or 0.4% who are 90 and older.

As of 2000, there were 218 people who were single and never married in the municipality. There were 228 married individuals, 24 widows or widowers and 21 individuals who are divorced.

As of 2000, there were 176 private households in the municipality, and an average of 2.6 persons per household. There were 45 households that consist of only one person and 18 households with five or more people. In 2000, a total of 173 apartments (84.8% of the total) were permanently occupied, while 19 apartments (9.3%) were seasonally occupied and 12 apartments (5.9%) were empty. As of 2009, the construction rate of new housing units was 7.6 new units per 1000 residents. The vacancy rate for the municipality, in 2010, was 0.75%.

The historical population is given in the following chart:

== Sights ==
The entire Font region (shared between Châbles and Font) is designated as part of the Inventory of Swiss Heritage Sites.

== Politics ==
In the 2011 federal election the most popular party was the SP which received 25.6% of the vote. The next three most popular parties were the SVP (23.3%), the CVP (22.5%) and the FDP (11.7%).

The SPS improved their position in Châbles rising to first, from second with 24.7% The SVP changed from first in 2007 to second in 2011 while the CVP decreased in popularity (24.7% in 2007 to 23.3% in 2011) and the FDP remained about the same (9.9% in 2007 to 11.7% in 2011). A total of 241 votes were cast in this election, of which 5 or 2.1% were invalid.

== Economy ==
As of 2010, Châbles had an unemployment rate of 2.9%. As of 2008, there were 42 people employed in the primary economic sector and about 11 businesses involved in this sector. 32 people were employed in the secondary sector and there were 7 businesses in this sector. 23 people were employed in the tertiary sector, with 8 businesses in this sector. There were 244 residents of the municipality who were employed in some capacity, of which females made up 41.4% of the workforce.

In 2008 the total number of full-time equivalent jobs was 71. The number of jobs in the primary sector was 27, all of which were in agriculture. The number of jobs in the secondary sector was 30 of which 18 or (60.0%) were in manufacturing and 10 (33.3%) were in construction. The number of jobs in the tertiary sector was 14. In the tertiary sector; 1 was in the sale or repair of motor vehicles, 1 was in a hotel or restaurant, 3 or 21.4% were technical professionals or scientists, 3 or 21.4% were in education and 3 or 21.4% were in health care.

In 2000, there were 29 workers who commuted into the municipality and 182 workers who commuted away. The municipality is a net exporter of workers, with about 6.3 workers leaving the municipality for every one entering. Of the working population, 7% used public transportation to get to work, and 71.3% used a private car.

== Religion ==
From the 2000 census, 311 or 63.3% were Roman Catholic, while 95 or 19.3% belonged to the Swiss Reformed Church. Of the rest of the population, there were 2 members of an Orthodox church (or about 0.41% of the population), there was 1 individual who belongs to the Christian Catholic Church, and there were 21 individuals (or about 4.28% of the population) who belonged to another Christian church. There was 1 individual who was Islamic. There were 1 individual who belonged to another church. 57 (or about 11.61% of the population) belonged to no church, are agnostic or atheist, and 12 individuals (or about 2.44% of the population) did not answer the question.

== Education ==
In Châbles about 171 or (34.8%) of the population have completed non-mandatory upper secondary education, and 68 or (13.8%) have completed additional higher education (either university or a Fachhochschule). Of the 68 who completed tertiary schooling, 50.0% were Swiss men, 26.5% were Swiss women, 11.8% were non-Swiss men and 11.8% were non-Swiss women.

The Canton of Fribourg school system provides one year of non-obligatory Kindergarten, followed by six years of Primary school. This is followed by three years of obligatory lower Secondary school where the students are separated according to ability and aptitude. Following the lower Secondary students may attend a three or four year optional upper Secondary school. The upper Secondary school is divided into gymnasium (university preparatory) and vocational programs. After they finish the upper Secondary program, students may choose to attend a Tertiary school or continue their apprenticeship.

During the 2010–11 school year, there were a total of 74 students attending 4 classes in Châbles. A total of 108 students from the municipality attended any school, either in the municipality or outside of it. There were no kindergarten classes in the municipality, but 13 students attended kindergarten in a neighboring municipality. There were 4 primary classes with a total of 74 students. There were no lower secondary classes in the municipality, but 24 students attended lower secondary school in a neighboring municipality. There were no upper Secondary classes or vocational classes, but there were 5 upper Secondary vocational students who attended classes in another municipality. There were no non-university Tertiary classes, but there was one non-university Tertiary student and one specialized Tertiary student who attended classes in another municipality.

As of 2000, there were 24 students in Châbles who came from another municipality, while 65 residents attended schools outside the municipality.
