= Châtillon, Switzerland =

Châtillon, Switzerland may refer to:

- Châtillon, Jura, Switzerland
- Châtillon, Fribourg
- Châtillon, Bern, part of the municipality of Prêles in the Canton of Berne
