= Murist =

- Former municipality
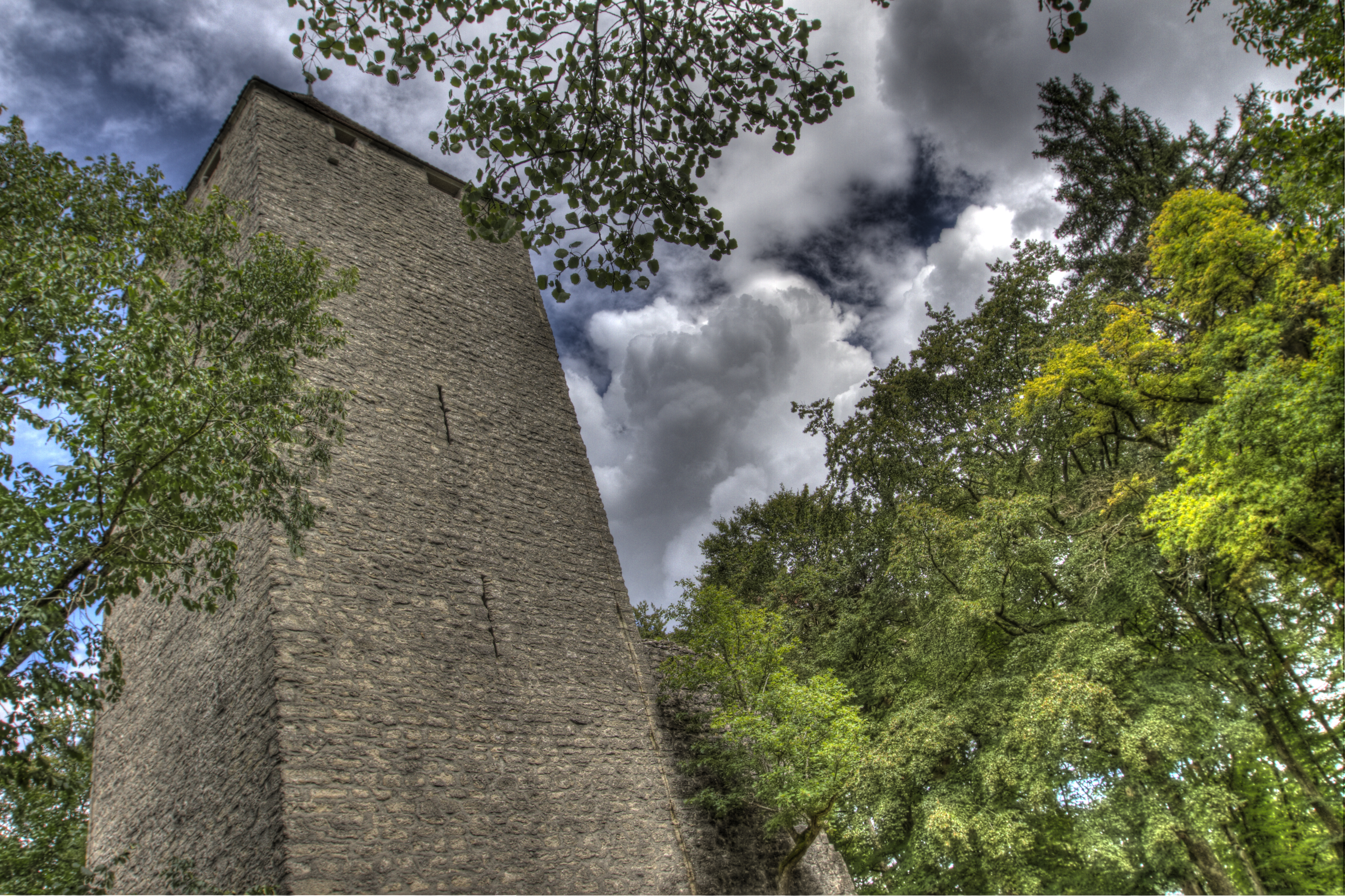
- La Molière tower in Murist

- Coat of arms
- Location of Murist
- Location within Switzerland Location within Canton of Fribourg
- Coordinates: 46°47′N 6°48′E
- Country: Switzerland
- Canton: Fribourg
- District: Broye

Government
  - Mayor: Syndic

Area
  - Total: 8.20 km^{2} (3.17 sq mi)
- Elevation: 662 m (2,172 ft)

Population (Dec 2015)
  - Total: 621
  - Density: 75.7/km^{2} (196/sq mi)
- Time zone: UTC+01:00 (CET)
  - Summer (DST): UTC+02:00 (CEST)
- Postal code: 1489
- SFOS number: 2034
- ISO 3166 code: CH-FR
- Localities: Murist, Franex, La Vounaise, Montborget
- Surrounded by: Bollion, Châbles, Chavannes-le-Chêne (VD), Cheyres, Les Montets, Nuvilly, Seiry, Treytorrens (Payerne) (VD)
- Website: SFSO statistics

Murist (French: [myʁist]; Arpitan: Muri [myˈʁi]) is a former municipality in the district of Broye, in the canton of Fribourg, Switzerland.

Its territory was enlarged in 1981 with the formerly independent municipalities La Vounaise and Montborget, and in 1992 with Franex. On 1 January 2017 the former municipalities of Murist, Bussy, Estavayer-le-Lac, Morens, Rueyres-les-Prés, Vernay and Vuissens merged into the new municipality of Estavayer.

== History ==
Murist is first mentioned in 1228 as Muris.

== Geography ==
Murist has an area, as of 2009, of 8.2 square kilometers (3.2 mi^{2}). Of this area, 6.11 km^{2} (2.36 mi^{2}) or 74.5% is used for agricultural purposes, while 1.47 km^{2} (0.57 mi^{2}) or 17.9% is forested. Of the rest of the land, 0.62 km^{2} (0.24 mi^{2}) or 7.6% is settled (buildings or roads).

Of the built up area, housing and buildings made up 2.9% and transportation infrastructure made up 4.0%. Out of the forested land, 15.7% of the total land area is heavily forested and 2.2% is covered with orchards or small clusters of trees. Of the agricultural land, 51.3% is used for growing crops and 21.5% is pastures, while 1.7% is used for orchards or vine crops.

The former municipality is located in the Broye district, in the Estavayer-le-Lac exclave.

== Coat of arms ==
The blazon of the municipal coat of arms is Gules, a Tower Argent roofed issuant from Coupeaux Sable between two Mullets Or pierced.

== Demographics ==
Murist had a population (as of 2015) of 621. As of 2008, 6.0% of the population are resident foreign nationals. Over the last 10 years (2000–2010) the population has changed at a rate of 31.9%. Migration accounted for 28.4%, while births and deaths accounted for 3.8%.

Most of the population (as of 2000) speaks French (396 or 91.9%) as their first language, German is the second most common (31 or 7.2%) and Italian is the third (3 or 0.7%).

As of 2008, the population was 50.2% male and 49.8% female. The population was made up of 254 Swiss men (45.7% of the population) and 25 (4.5%) non-Swiss men. There were 261 Swiss women (46.9%) and 16 (2.9%) non-Swiss women. Of the population in the municipality, 198 or about 45.9% were born in Murist and lived there in 2000. There were 98 or 22.7% who were born in the same canton, while 85 or 19.7% were born somewhere else in Switzerland, and 27 or 6.3% were born outside of Switzerland.

The age distribution, as of 2000, in Murist is; 70 children or 16.2% of the population are between 0 and 9 years old and 49 teenagers or 11.4% are between 10 and 19. Of the adult population, 41 people or 9.5% of the population are between 20 and 29 years old. 70 people or 16.2% are between 30 and 39, 65 people or 15.1% are between 40 and 49, and 48 people or 11.1% are between 50 and 59. The senior population distribution is 35 people or 8.1% of the population are between 60 and 69 years old, 40 people or 9.3% are between 70 and 79, there are 11 people or 2.6% who are between 80 and 89, and there are 2 people or 0.5% who are 90 and older.

As of 2000, there were 182 people who were single and never married in the municipality. There were 203 married individuals, 26 widows or widowers and 20 individuals who are divorced.

As of 2000, there were 161 private households in the municipality, and an average of 2.6 persons per household. There were 48 households that consist of only one person and 20 households with five or more people. In 2000, a total of 160 apartments (89.9% of the total) were permanently occupied, while 11 apartments (6.2%) were seasonally occupied and 7 apartments (3.9%) were empty. As of 2009, the construction rate of new housing units was 10.8 new units per 1000 residents. The vacancy rate for the municipality, in 2010, was 0.44%.

The historical population is given in the following chart:

== Heritage sites of national significance ==
Saint-Pierre Church and the La Molière tower are listed as Swiss heritage site of national significance.

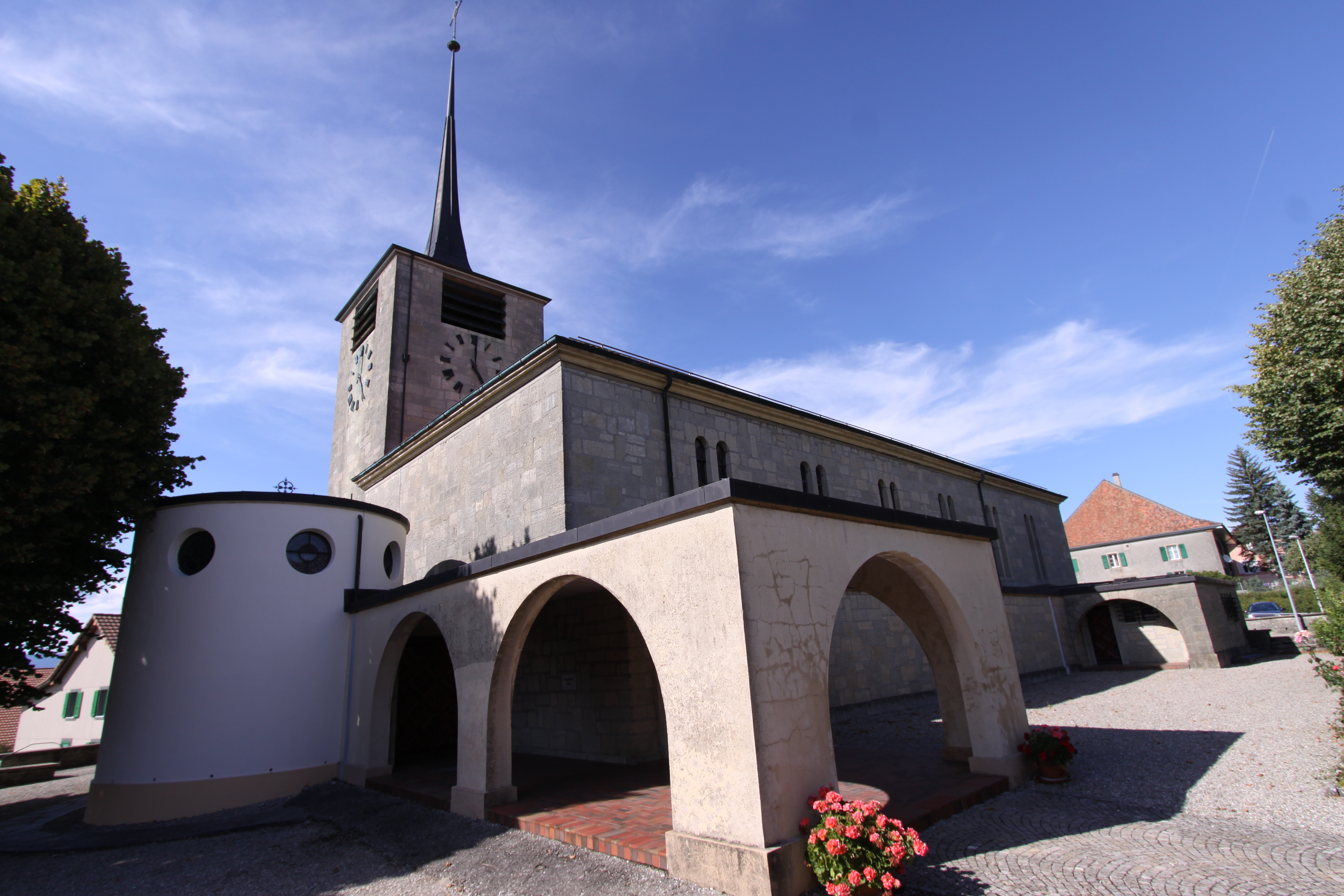
Saint-Pierre Church

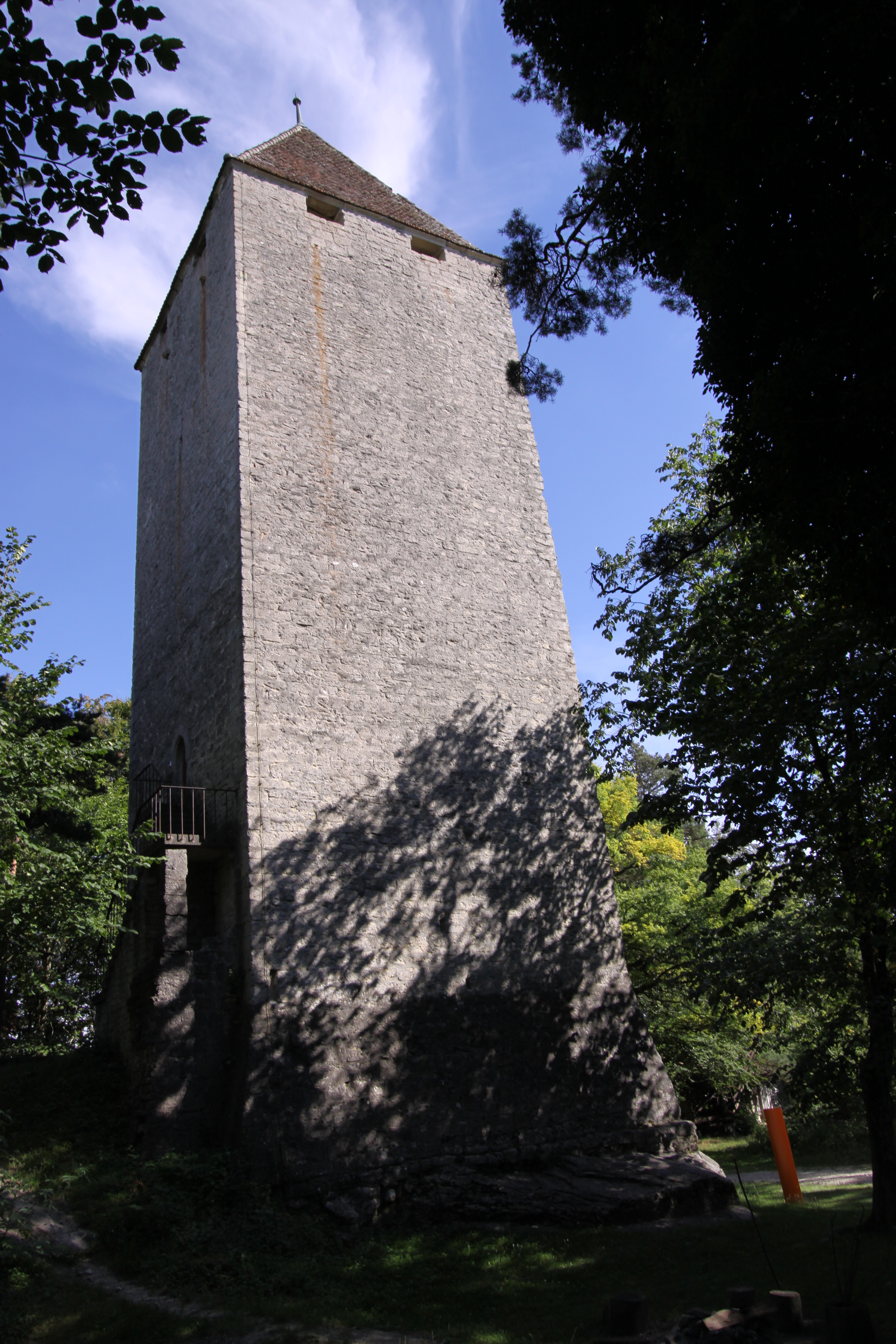
La Molière tower

== Politics ==
In the 2011 federal election the most popular party was the SVP which received 25.1% of the vote. The next three most popular parties were the SP (23.4%), the CVP (19.4%) and the FDP (15.9%).

The SVP received about the same percentage of the vote as they did in the 2007 Federal election (25.5% in 2007 vs 25.1% in 2011). The SPS moved from fourth in 2007 (with 19.5%) to second in 2011, the CVP retained about the same popularity (19.6% in 2007) and the FDP moved from second in 2007 (with 22.7%) to fourth. A total of 207 votes were cast in this election, of which 5 or 2.4% were invalid.

== Economy ==
As of 2010, Murist had an unemployment rate of 3%. As of 2008, there were 84 people employed in the primary economic sector and about 25 businesses involved in this sector. 19 people were employed in the secondary sector and there were 2 businesses in this sector. 43 people were employed in the tertiary sector, with 12 businesses in this sector. There were 208 residents of the municipality who were employed in some capacity, of which females made up 41.8% of the workforce.

In 2008 the total number of full-time equivalent jobs was 105. The number of jobs in the primary sector was 59, all of which were in agriculture. The number of jobs in the secondary sector was 18, all of which were in manufacturing. The number of jobs in the tertiary sector was 28. In the tertiary sector; 13 or 46.4% were in wholesale or retail sales or the repair of motor vehicles, 4 or 14.3% were in the movement and storage of goods, 2 or 7.1% were in a hotel or restaurant, 3 or 10.7% were technical professionals or scientists, 4 or 14.3% were in education.

In 2000, there were 29 workers who commuted into the municipality and 131 workers who commuted away. The municipality is a net exporter of workers, with about 4.5 workers leaving the municipality for every one entering. Of the working population, 1.9% used public transportation to get to work, and 61.5% used a private car.

== Religion ==
From the 2000 census, 294 or 68.2% were Roman Catholic, while 89 or 20.6% belonged to the Swiss Reformed Church. Of the rest of the population, there was 1 member of an Orthodox church. 22 (or about 5.10% of the population) belonged to no church, are agnostic or atheist, and 25 individuals (or about 5.80% of the population) did not answer the question.

== Education ==
In Murist about 120 or (27.8%) of the population have completed non-mandatory upper secondary education, and 41 or (9.5%) have completed additional higher education (either university or a Fachhochschule). Of the 41 who completed tertiary schooling, 70.7% were Swiss men, 26.8% were Swiss women.

The Canton of Fribourg school system provides one year of non-obligatory Kindergarten, followed by six years of Primary school. This is followed by three years of obligatory lower Secondary school where the students are separated according to ability and aptitude. Following the lower Secondary students may attend a three or four year optional upper Secondary school. The upper Secondary school is divided into gymnasium (university preparatory) and vocational programs. After they finish the upper Secondary program, students may choose to attend a Tertiary school or continue their apprenticeship.

During the 2010–11 school year, there were a total of 70 students attending 4 classes in Murist. A total of 91 students from the municipality attended any school, either in the municipality or outside of it. There was one kindergarten class with a total of 15 students in the municipality. The municipality had 3 primary classes and 55 students. During the same year, there were no lower secondary classes in the municipality, but 24 students attended lower secondary school in a neighboring municipality. There were no upper Secondary classes or vocational classes, but there were 9 upper Secondary vocational students who attended classes in another municipality. The municipality had no non-university Tertiary classes, but there was one non-university Tertiary student and one specialized Tertiary student who attended classes in another municipality.

As of 2000, there were 10 students in Murist who came from another municipality, while 37 residents attended schools outside the municipality.
