= Franex =

Village and former municipality in Fribourg, Switzerland

Coordinates: 46.800°N 6.817°E

Franex is a village and former municipality in the district of Broye in the canton of Fribourg, Switzerland.

It was first recorded in 1242 as Frasnei.

The municipality had 84 inhabitants in 1811, which increased to 131 in 1850. It then declined to 115 in 1900, 110 in 1950 and 46 in 1990.

In 1992 the municipality was incorporated into the larger, neighboring municipality Murist.
