= Morens, Fribourg =

Morens
- Former municipality
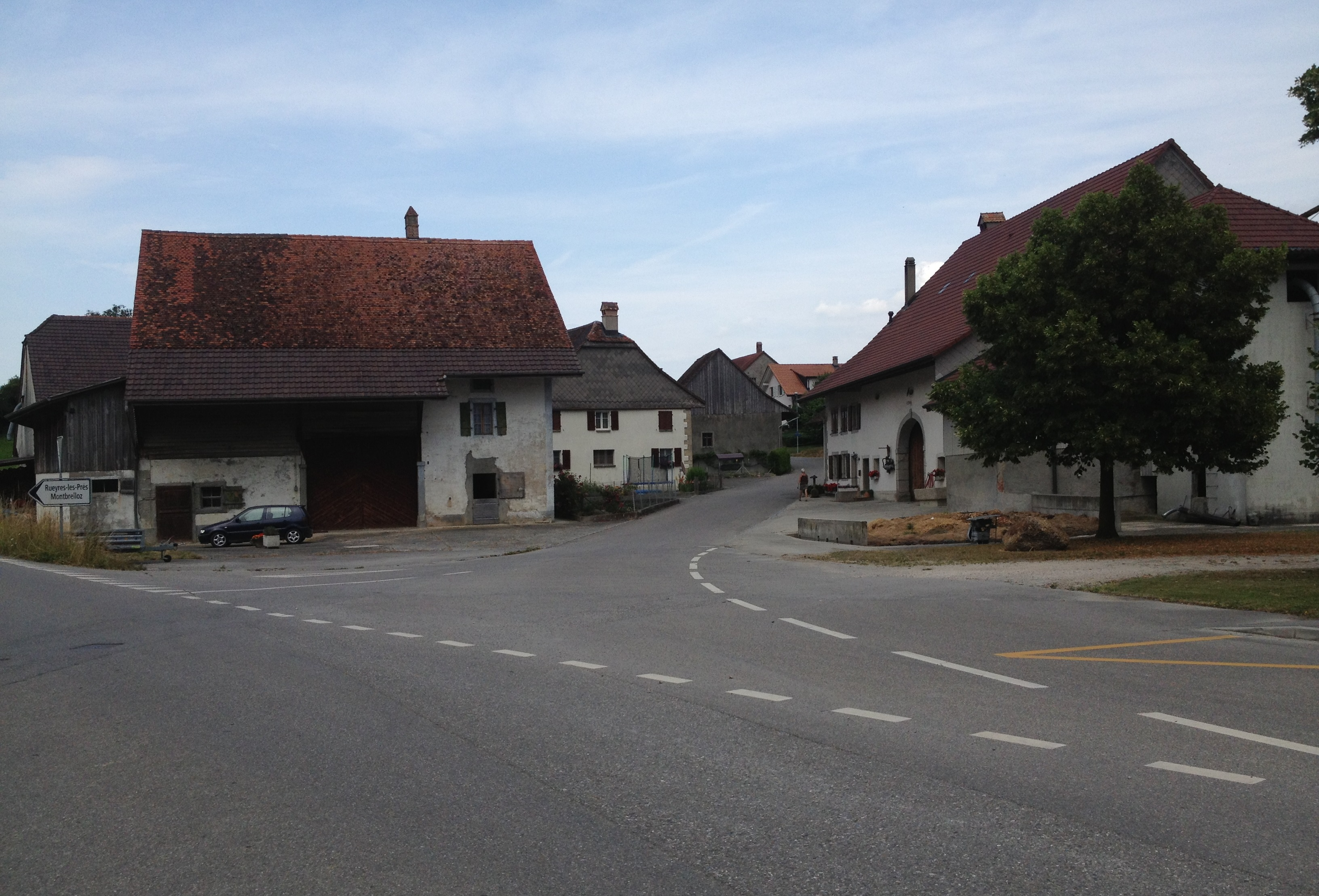

- Coat of arms
- Location of Morens
- Location within Switzerland Location within Canton of Fribourg
- Coordinates: 46°51′N 6°54′E
- Country: Switzerland
- Canton: Fribourg
- District: Broye

Government
  - Mayor: Syndic

Area
  - Total: 2.58 km^{2} (1.00 sq mi)
- Elevation: 449 m (1,473 ft)

Population (Dec 2015)
  - Total: 154
  - Density: 59.7/km^{2} (155/sq mi)
- Time zone: UTC+01:00 (CET)
  - Summer (DST): UTC+02:00 (CEST)
- Postal code: 1541
- SFOS number: 2033
- ISO 3166 code: CH-FR
- Surrounded by: Bussy, Montbrelloz, Payerne (VD), Rueyres-les-Prés
- Website: morens-fr.ch

Morens (French: [mɔʁɑ̃s], Franco-Provençal: [moˈʁɛ̃]) is a former municipality in the district of Broye, in the canton of Fribourg, Switzerland. On 1 January 2017 the former municipalities of Morens, Bussy, Estavayer-le-Lac, Murist, Rueyres-les-Prés, Vernay and Vuissens merged into the new municipality of Estavayer.

== History ==
Morens is first mentioned in 1216 as Morens.

== Geography ==
Morens had an area, as of 2009, of 2.6 square kilometers (1.0 mi^{2}). Of this area, 1.73 km^{2} (0.67 mi^{2}) or 66.5% is used for agricultural purposes, while 0.42 km^{2} (0.16 mi^{2}) or 16.2% is forested. Of the rest of the land, 0.42 km^{2} (0.16 mi^{2}) or 16.2% is settled (buildings or roads), 0.03 km^{2} (7.4 acres) or 1.2% is either rivers or lakes.

Of the built up area, housing and buildings made up 4.6% and transportation infrastructure made up 11.2%. Out of the forested land, 15.0% of the total land area is heavily forested and 1.2% is covered with orchards or small clusters of trees. Of the agricultural land, 58.1% is used for growing crops and 8.1% is pastures. All the water in the municipality is flowing water.

The former municipality is located in the Broye district, in the Estavayer-le-Lac exclave.

== Coat of arms ==
The blazon of the municipal coat of arms is Gules, on a Pale Argent three Roses of the field barbed and seeded proper.

== Demographics ==
Morens had a population (as of 2015) of 154. As of 2008, 4.5% of the population are resident foreign nationals. Over the last 10 years (2000–2010) the population has changed at a rate of 22.4%. Migration accounted for 13.6%, while births and deaths accounted for 13.6%.

Most of the population (as of 2000) speaks French (110 or 89.4%) as their first language, German is the second most common (10 or 8.1%) and Portuguese is the third (2 or 1.6%).

As of 2008, the population was 49.7% male and 50.3% female. The population was made up of 74 Swiss men (47.1% of the population) and 4 (2.5%) non-Swiss men. There were 74 Swiss women (47.1%) and 5 (3.2%) non-Swiss women. Of the population in the municipality, 60 or about 48.8% were born in Morens and lived there in 2000. There were 35 or 28.5% who were born in the same canton, while 20 or 16.3% were born somewhere else in Switzerland, and 6 or 4.9% were born outside of Switzerland.

The age distribution, as of 2000, in Morens is; 18 children or 14.6% of the population are between 0 and 9 years old and 13 teenagers or 10.6% are between 10 and 19. Of the adult population, 14 people or 11.4% of the population are between 20 and 29 years old. 22 people or 17.9% are between 30 and 39, 15 people or 12.2% are between 40 and 49, and 24 people or 19.5% are between 50 and 59. The senior population distribution is 7 people or 5.7% of the population are between 60 and 69 years old, 4 people or 3.3% are between 70 and 79, there are 5 people or 4.1% who are between 80 and 89, and there is 1 person who is 90 and older.

As of 2000, there were 49 people who were single and never married in the municipality. There were 61 married individuals, 9 widows or widowers and 4 individuals who are divorced.

As of 2000, there were 48 private households in the municipality, and an average of 2.6 persons per household. There were 11 households that consist of only one person and 1 households with five or more people. In 2000, a total of 45 apartments (84.9% of the total) were permanently occupied, while 5 apartments (9.4%) were seasonally occupied and 3 apartments (5.7%) were empty. As of 2009, the construction rate of new housing units was 6.5 new units per 1000 residents.

The historical population is given in the following chart:

== Politics ==
In the 2011 federal election the most popular party was the SVP which received 41.9% of the vote. The next three most popular parties were the SP (21.6%), the CVP (16.4%) and the FDP (13.5%).

The SVP received about the same percentage of the vote as they did in the 2007 Federal election (40.8% in 2007 vs 41.9% in 2011). The SPS retained about the same popularity (18.4% in 2007), the CVP retained about the same popularity (16.6% in 2007) and the FDP retained about the same popularity (13.0% in 2007). A total of 63 votes were cast in this election, of which 1 or 1.6% was invalid.

== Economy ==
As of 2010, Morens had an unemployment rate of 2.1%. As of 2008, there were 38 people employed in the primary economic sector and about 11 businesses involved in this sector. No one was employed in the secondary sector. 2 people were employed in the tertiary sector, with 1 business in this sector. There were 75 residents of the municipality who were employed in some capacity, of which females made up 44.0% of the workforce.

In 2008 the total number of full-time equivalent jobs was 22. The number of jobs in the primary sector was 21, all of which were in agriculture. There were no jobs in the secondary sector. There was one tertiary job, in education.

In 2000, there were 3 workers who commuted into the municipality and 50 workers who commuted away. The municipality is a net exporter of workers, with about 16.7 workers leaving the municipality for every one entering.

== Religion ==
From the 2000 census, 86 or 69.9% were Roman Catholic, while 22 or 17.9% belonged to the Swiss Reformed Church. There was 1 individual who was Islamic. 4 (or about 3.25% of the population) belonged to no church, are agnostic or atheist, and 10 individuals (or about 8.13% of the population) did not answer the question.

== Education ==
In Morens about 44 or (35.8%) of the population have completed non-mandatory upper secondary education, and 7 or (5.7%) have completed additional higher education (either university or a Fachhochschule). Of the 7 who completed tertiary schooling, 85.7% were Swiss men, 14.3% were Swiss women.

The Canton of Fribourg school system provides one year of non-obligatory Kindergarten, followed by six years of Primary school. This is followed by three years of obligatory lower Secondary school where the students are separated according to ability and aptitude. Following the lower Secondary students may attend a three or four year optional upper Secondary school. The upper Secondary school is divided into gymnasium (university preparatory) and vocational programs. After they finish the upper Secondary program, students may choose to attend a Tertiary school or continue their apprenticeship.

During the 2010–11 school year, there were a total of 18 students attending one class in Morens. A total of 26 students from the municipality attended any school, either in the municipality or outside of it. There were no kindergarten classes in the municipality, but 2 students attended kindergarten in a neighboring municipality. The municipality had one primary class and 18 students. During the same year, there were no lower secondary classes in the municipality, but 3 students attended lower secondary school in a neighboring municipality. There were no upper Secondary classes or vocational classes, but there was one upper Secondary student and one upper Secondary vocational student who attended classes in another municipality. The municipality had no non-university Tertiary classes. who attended classes in another municipality.

As of 2000, there were 15 students in Morens who came from another municipality, while 9 residents attended schools outside the municipality.
