= Montborget =

Village in the district of Broye in the canton of Fribourg, Switzerland

Coordinates: 46°48′00.02″N 6°47′00.02″E

Montborget (French: [mɔ̃bɔʁʒɛ], Franco-Provençal: [mɔ̃bɔʁˈdzɛ]) is a village and former municipality in the district of Broye in the canton of Fribourg, Switzerland.

It was first recorded in 1314 as Mauborget.

The municipality had 98 inhabitants in 1811, which increased to 124 in 1850 and 137 in 1900. It then declined to 104 in 1950 and 79 in 1980.

In 1981 the municipality was incorporated into the larger, neighboring municipality Murist.
