= Lully, Fribourg =

Lully
- Municipality
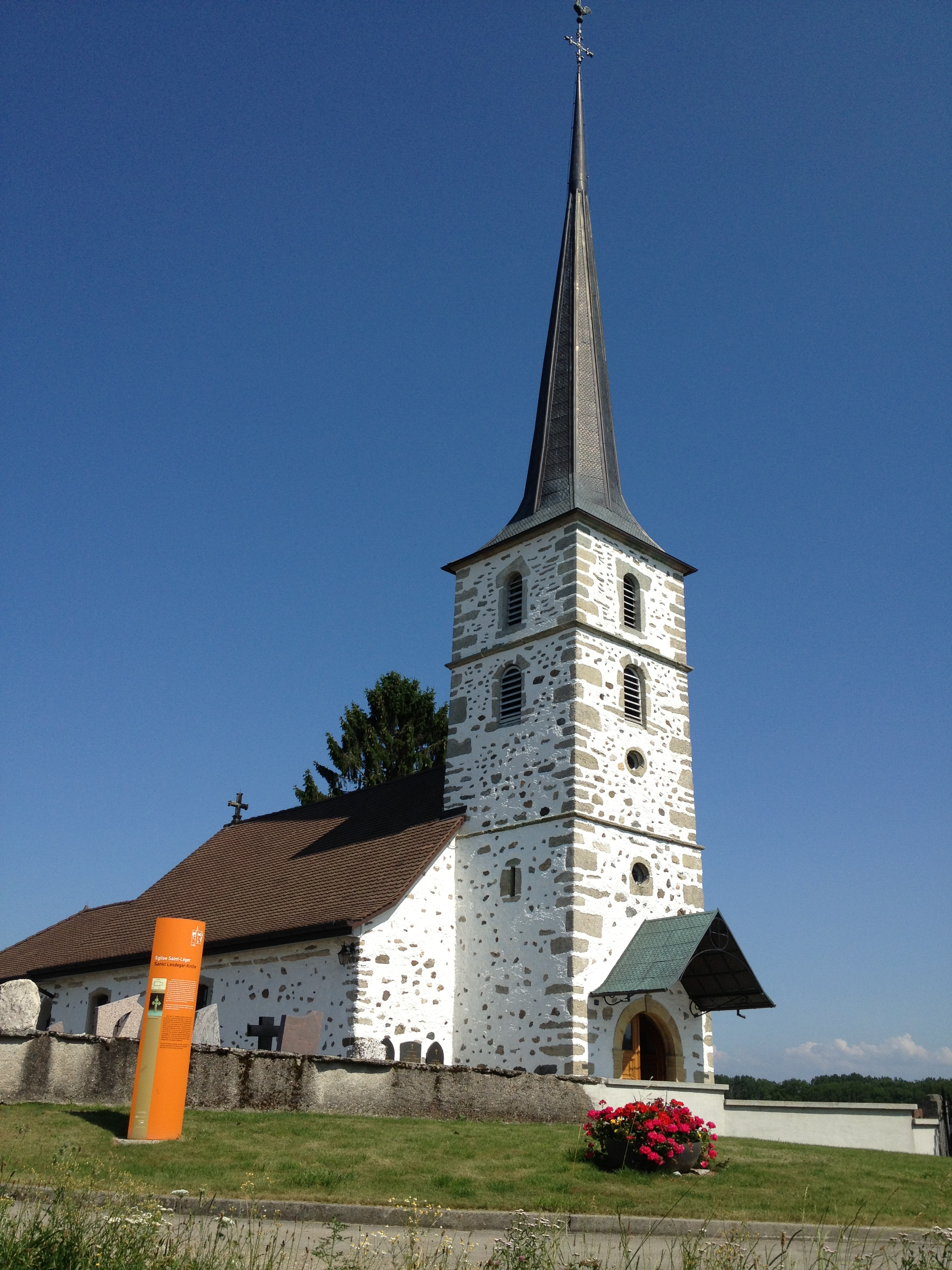

- Coat of arms
- Location of Lully
- Location within Switzerland Location within Canton of Fribourg
- Coordinates: 46°50′N 6°51′E
- Country: Switzerland
- Canton: Fribourg
- District: Broye

Government
  - Mayor: Syndic

Area
  - Total: 5.5 km^{2} (2.1 sq mi)
- Elevation: 494 m (1,621 ft)

Population (December 2020)
  - Total: 1,156
  - Density: 210/km^{2} (540/sq mi)
- Time zone: UTC+01:00 (CET)
  - Summer (DST): UTC+02:00 (CEST)
- Postal code: 1470
- SFOS number: 2025
- ISO 3166 code: CH-FR
- Surrounded by: Estavayer, Cheyres-Châbles, Les Montets
- Website: lully-fr.ch

Lully (French pronunciation: [lyli]; Arpitan: Lulyi) is a municipality in the district of Broye, in the canton of Fribourg, Switzerland. On 1 January 2006 Lully incorporated the formerly independent municipalities of Bollion and Seiry as a result of boundary changes by the cantonal authorities.

== History ==
Lully is first mentioned in 1011 as in villa Lulliaco.

== Geography ==
Lully has an area, as of 2009, of 5.5 square kilometers (2.1 mi^{2}). Of this area, 3.66 km^{2} (1.41 mi^{2}) or 66.5% is used for agricultural purposes, while 1.12 km^{2} (0.43 mi^{2}) or 20.4% is forested. Of the rest of the land, 0.69 km^{2} (0.27 mi^{2}) or 12.5% is settled (buildings or roads), 0.01 km^{2} (2.5 acres) or 0.2% is either rivers or lakes.

Of the built up area, housing and buildings made up 4.2% and transportation infrastructure made up 7.3%. Out of the forested land, 18.7% of the total land area is heavily forested and 1.6% is covered with orchards or small clusters of trees. Of the agricultural land, 43.3% is used for growing crops and 19.5% is pastures, while 3.8% is used for orchards or vine crops. All the water in the municipality is flowing water.

The municipality is located in the Broye district, south of Estavayer-le-Lac. It consists of the villages of Lully, Bollion and Seiry.

Aerial view from 500 m by Walter Mittelholzer (1925)

== Coat of arms ==
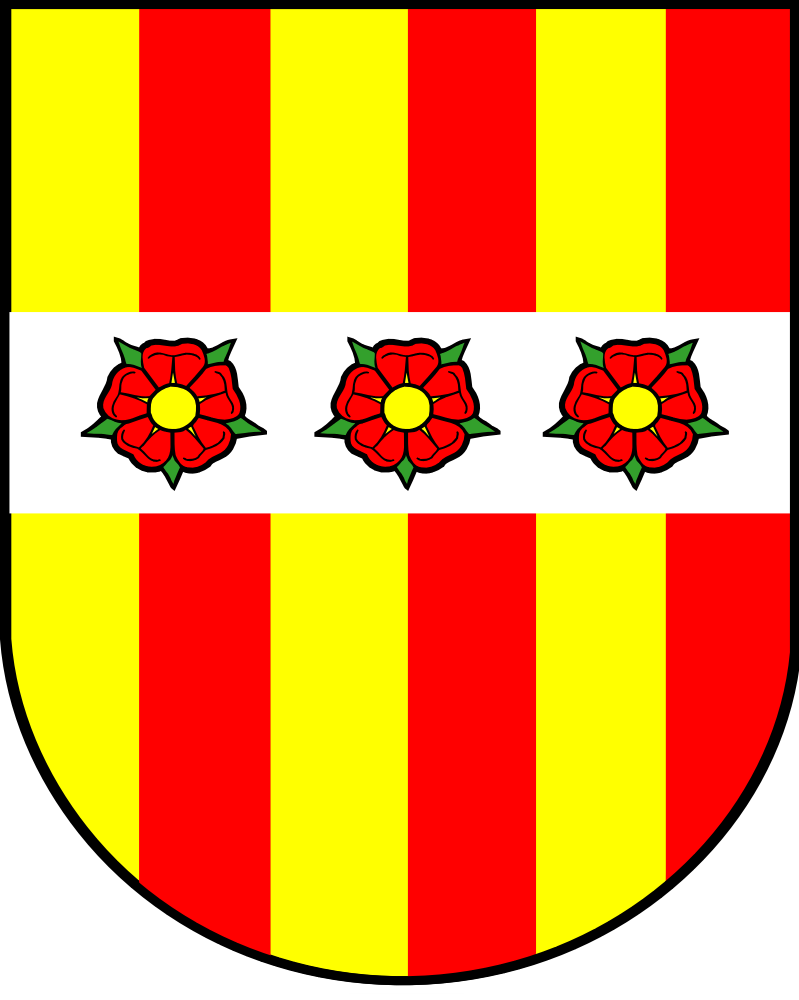
Former coat of arms of Lully

The pre-merger blazon of the municipal coat of arms was Pally of Eight Or and Gules, overall on a Fess Argent three Roses Gules barbed and seeded proper.

The current coat of arms includes portions of all three former coats of arms.

== Demographics ==
Lully has a population (as of December 2020) of 1,156. As of 2008, 11.1% of the population are resident foreign nationals. Over the last 10 years (2000–2010) the population has changed at a rate of 34.1%. Migration accounted for 31.2%, while births and deaths accounted for 9.3%.

Most of the population (as of 2000) speaks French (322 or 88.7%) as their first language, German is the second most common (22 or 6.1%) and Italian is the third (13 or 3.6%).

As of 2008, the population was 50.6% male and 49.4% female. The population was made up of 410 Swiss men (45.2% of the population) and 49 (5.4%) non-Swiss men. There were 398 Swiss women (43.9%) and 50 (5.5%) non-Swiss women. Of the population in the municipality, 65 or about 17.9% were born in Lully and lived there in 2000. There were 150 or 41.3% who were born in the same canton, while 99 or 27.3% were born somewhere else in Switzerland, and 45 or 12.4% were born outside of Switzerland.

The age distribution, as of 2000, in Lully is; 105 children or 15.2% of the population are between 0 and 9 years old and 96 teenagers or 13.9% are between 10 and 19. Of the adult population, 80 people or 11.6% of the population are between 20 and 29 years old. 133 people or 19.2% are between 30 and 39, 98 people or 14.2% are between 40 and 49, and 83 people or 12.0% are between 50 and 59. The senior population distribution is 48 people or 6.9% of the population are between 60 and 69 years old, 30 people or 4.3% are between 70 and 79, there are 17 people or 2.5% who are between 80 and 89, and there are 2 people or 0.3% who are 90 and older.

As of 2000, there were 145 people who were single and never married in the municipality. There were 182 married individuals, 15 widows or widowers and 21 individuals who are divorced.

As of 2000, there were 260 private households in the municipality, and an average of 2.6 persons per household. There were 32 households that consist of only one person and 14 households with five or more people. In 2000, a total of 134 apartments (94.4% of the total) were permanently occupied, while 5 apartments (3.5%) were seasonally occupied and 3 apartments (2.1%) were empty. As of 2009, the construction rate of new housing units was 6.6 new units per 1000 residents. The vacancy rate for the municipality, in 2010, was 0.26%.

The historical population is given in the following chart:

== Politics ==
In the 2011 federal election the most popular party was the CVP which received 31.7% of the vote. The next three most popular parties were the SVP (26.5%), the SP (19.5%) and the FDP (7.4%).

The CVP improved their position in Lully rising to first, from second in 2007 (with 25.2%) The SVP moved from first in 2007 (with 27.8%) to second in 2011, the SPS retained about the same popularity (17.4% in 2007) and the FDP lost popularity (12.8% in 2007). A total of 365 votes were cast in this election, of which 3 or 0.8% were invalid.

== Economy ==
As of 2010, Lully had an unemployment rate of 2.4%. As of 2008, there were 41 people employed in the primary economic sector and about 14 businesses involved in this sector. 7 people were employed in the secondary sector and there were 4 businesses in this sector. 174 people were employed in the tertiary sector, with 24 businesses in this sector. There were 188 residents of the municipality who were employed in some capacity, of which females made up 45.2% of the workforce.

In 2008 the total number of full-time equivalent jobs was 137. The number of jobs in the primary sector was 23, all of which were in agriculture. The number of jobs in the secondary sector was 6, all of which were in construction. The number of jobs in the tertiary sector was 108. In the tertiary sector; 23 or 21.3% were in wholesale or retail sales or the repair of motor vehicles, 2 or 1.9% were in the movement and storage of goods, 51 or 47.2% were in a hotel or restaurant, 5 or 4.6% were technical professionals or scientists, 5 or 4.6% were in education and 11 or 10.2% were in health care.

In 2000, there were 15 workers who commuted into the municipality and 146 workers who commuted away. The municipality is a net exporter of workers, with about 9.7 workers leaving the municipality for every one entering. Of the working population, 3.4% used public transportation to get to work, and 70.8% used a private car.

== Religion ==
From the 2000 census, 244 or 67.2% were Roman Catholic, while 64 or 17.6% belonged to the Swiss Reformed Church. Of the rest of the population, there was 1 individual who belongs to the Christian Catholic Church, and there were 29 individuals (or about 7.99% of the population) who belonged to another Christian church. There were 3 (or about 0.83% of the population) who were Islamic. There were 1 individual who belonged to another church. 28 (or about 7.71% of the population) belonged to no church, are agnostic or atheist, and 7 individuals (or about 1.93% of the population) did not answer the question.

== Education ==
In Lully about 134 or (36.9%) of the population have completed non-mandatory upper secondary education, and 34 or (9.4%) have completed additional higher education (either university or a Fachhochschule). Of the 34 who completed tertiary schooling, 73.5% were Swiss men, 23.5% were Swiss women.

The Canton of Fribourg school system provides one year of non-obligatory Kindergarten, followed by six years of Primary school. This is followed by three years of obligatory lower Secondary school where the students are separated according to ability and aptitude. Following the lower Secondary students may attend a three or four year optional upper Secondary school. The upper Secondary school is divided into gymnasium (university preparatory) and vocational programs. After they finish the upper Secondary program, students may choose to attend a Tertiary school or continue their apprenticeship.

During the 2010–11 school year, there were a total of 128 students attending 7 classes in Lully. A total of 184 students from the municipality attended any school, either in the municipality or outside of it. There were 2 kindergarten classes with a total of 38 students in the municipality. The municipality had 5 primary classes and 90 students. During the same year, there were no lower secondary classes in the municipality, but 37 students attended lower secondary school in a neighboring municipality. There were no upper Secondary classes or vocational classes, but there were 2 upper Secondary students and 17 upper Secondary vocational students who attended classes in another municipality. The municipality had no non-university Tertiary classes, but there were 4 specialized Tertiary students who attended classes in another municipality.

As of 2000, there were 24 students in Lully who came from another municipality, while 43 residents attended schools outside the municipality.
