= La Vounaise =

Coordinates: 46°48′13″N 6°48′46″E

La Vounaise is a village and former municipality in the district of Broye in the canton of Fribourg, Switzerland.

In 1981 the municipality was incorporated into the larger, neighboring municipality Murist.

== Coat of arms ==
The blazon of the district coat of arms is Argent, a [double] Rose Gules seeded Or and barbed Vert.
