= Cheyres =

- Former municipality
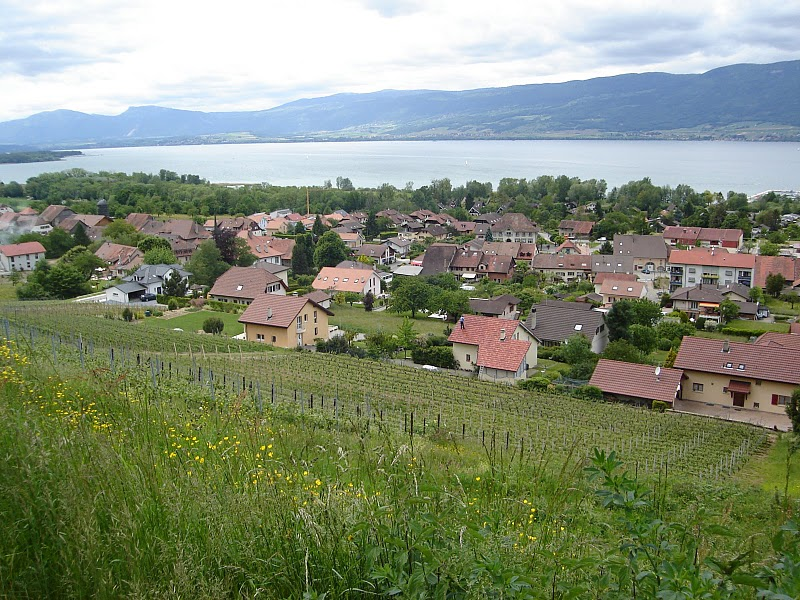
- Cheyres village

- Coat of arms
- Location of Cheyres
- Location within Switzerland Location within Canton of Fribourg
- Coordinates: 46°49′N 6°47′E
- Country: Switzerland
- Canton: Fribourg
- District: Broye

Government
  - Mayor: Syndic

Area
  - Total: 5.16 km^{2} (1.99 sq mi)
- Elevation: 454 m (1,490 ft)

Population (December 2020)
  - Total: 1,411
  - Density: 273/km^{2} (708/sq mi)
- Time zone: UTC+01:00 (CET)
  - Summer (DST): UTC+02:00 (CEST)
- Postal code: 1468
- SFOS number: 2010
- ISO 3166 code: CH-FR
- Surrounded by: Châbles, Chavannes-le-Chêne (VD), Concise (VD), Murist, Rovray (VD), Yvonand (VD)
- Twin towns: Saint-Martial (France)
- Website: cheyres.ch

Cheyres (Arpitan: Chêres, locally Tsêre [ˈtsɛʁ(ə)] or Tsàrè) is a former municipality in the district of Broye in the canton of Fribourg in Switzerland. On 1 January 2017 the former municipalities of Cheyres and Châbles merged into the new municipality of Cheyres-Châbles.

== History ==
Cheyres is first mentioned in 1230 as Cheres.

== Geography ==
Cheyres has an area, as of 2009, of 5.1 square kilometers (2.0 mi^{2}). Of this area, 2.18 km^{2} (0.84 mi^{2}) or 42.5% is used for agricultural purposes, while 1.83 km^{2} (0.71 mi^{2}) or 35.7% is forested. Of the rest of the land, 0.73 km^{2} (0.28 mi^{2}) or 14.2% is settled (buildings or roads), 0.05 km^{2} (12 acres) or 1.0% is either rivers or lakes and 0.34 km^{2} (0.13 mi^{2}) or 6.6% is unproductive land.

Of the built up area, housing and buildings made up 8.2% and transportation infrastructure made up 3.9%. while parks, green belts and sports fields made up 1.8%. Out of the forested land, all of the forested land area is covered with heavy forests. Of the agricultural land, 26.5% is used for growing crops and 11.1% is pastures, while 4.9% is used for orchards or vine crops. All the water in the municipality is in lakes.

The municipality is located in the Broye district, on the southern shore of Lake Neuchatel in the extreme western tip of the Estavayer-le-Lac exclave. It consists of the village of Cheyres and the hamlet of Granges-de-Cheyres.

The municipalities of Châbles, Cheyres, Murist, Nuvilly and Vuissens are considering a merger on at a date in the future into the new municipality with an, as of 2011, undetermined name.

== Coat of arms ==
The blazon of the municipal coat of arms is Gules, a Fess bendy Sable and Argent.

== Demographics ==
Cheyres has a population (as of December 2020) of 1,411. As of 2008, 7.1% of the population are resident foreign nationals. Over the last 10 years (2000–2010) the population has changed at a rate of 66.3%. Migration accounted for 65.8%, while births and deaths accounted for 1.9%.

Most of the population (as of 2000) speaks French (597 or 86.8%) as their first language, German is the second most common (66 or 9.6%) and Portuguese is the third (10 or 1.5%). There are 3 people who speak Italian and 1 person who speaks Romansh.

As of 2008, the population was 50.0% male and 50.0% female. The population was made up of 514 Swiss men (45.4% of the population) and 51 (4.5%) non-Swiss men. There were 526 Swiss women (46.5%) and 40 (3.5%) non-Swiss women. Of the population in the municipality, 193 or about 28.1% were born in Cheyres and lived there in 2000. There were 103 or 15.0% who were born in the same canton, while 290 or 42.2% were born somewhere else in Switzerland, and 73 or 10.6% were born outside of Switzerland.

The age distribution, as of 2000, in Cheyres is; 77 children or 11.2% of the population are between 0 and 9 years old and 79 teenagers or 11.5% are between 10 and 19. Of the adult population, 61 people or 8.9% of the population are between 20 and 29 years old. 119 people or 17.3% are between 30 and 39, 103 people or 15.0% are between 40 and 49, and 93 people or 13.5% are between 50 and 59. The senior population distribution is 75 people or 10.9% of the population are between 60 and 69 years old, 63 people or 9.2% are between 70 and 79, there are 18 people or 2.6% who are between 80 and 89.

As of 2000, there were 244 people who were single and never married in the municipality. There were 344 married individuals, 53 widows or widowers and 47 individuals who are divorced.

As of 2000, there were 295 private households in the municipality, and an average of 2.3 persons per household. There were 101 households that consist of only one person and 17 households with five or more people. In 2000, a total of 287 apartments (49.1% of the total) were permanently occupied, while 266 apartments (45.5%) were seasonally occupied and 32 apartments (5.5%) were empty. As of 2009, the construction rate of new housing units was 41.4 new units per 1000 residents.

The historical population is given in the following chart:

== Politics ==
In the 2011 federal election the most popular party was the SVP which received 28.6% of the vote. The next three most popular parties were the SP (26.7%), the CVP (17.2%) and the FDP (9.5%).

The SVP received about the same percentage of the vote as they did in the 2007 Federal election (28.7% in 2007 vs 28.6% in 2011). The SPS moved from third in 2007 (with 21.2%) to second in 2011, the CVP moved from second in 2007 (with 23.3%) to third and the FDP gained popularity (12.6% in 2007). A total of 364 votes were cast in this election, of which 6 or 1.6% were invalid.

== Economy ==
As of 2010, Cheyres had an unemployment rate of 5.3%. As of 2008, there were 30 people employed in the primary economic sector and about 10 businesses involved in this sector. 26 people were employed in the secondary sector and there were 10 businesses in this sector. 66 people were employed in the tertiary sector, with 22 businesses in this sector. There were 349 residents of the municipality who were employed in some capacity, of which females made up 42.1% of the workforce.

In 2008 the total number of full-time equivalent jobs was 100. The number of jobs in the primary sector was 21, all of which were in agriculture. The number of jobs in the secondary sector was 24 of which 11 or (45.8%) were in manufacturing and 13 (54.2%) were in construction. The number of jobs in the tertiary sector was 55. In the tertiary sector; 8 or 14.5% were in wholesale or retail sales or the repair of motor vehicles, 3 or 5.5% were in the movement and storage of goods, 24 or 43.6% were in a hotel or restaurant, 1 was in the information industry, 5 or 9.1% were technical professionals or scientists, 6 or 10.9% were in education.

In 2000, there were 18 workers who commuted into the municipality and 253 workers who commuted away. The municipality is a net exporter of workers, with about 14.1 workers leaving the municipality for every one entering. Of the working population, 8.6% used public transportation to get to work, and 69.9% used a private car.

== Religion ==
From the 2000 census, 384 or 55.8% were Roman Catholic, while 165 or 24.0% belonged to the Swiss Reformed Church. Of the rest of the population, there were 3 members of an Orthodox church (or about 0.44% of the population), there was 1 individual who belongs to the Christian Catholic Church, and there were 20 individuals (or about 2.91% of the population) who belonged to another Christian church. There were 3 (or about 0.44% of the population) who were Islamic. 84 (or about 12.21% of the population) belonged to no church, are agnostic or atheist, and 37 individuals (or about 5.38% of the population) did not answer the question.

== Education ==
In Cheyres about 251 or (36.5%) of the population have completed non-mandatory upper secondary education, and 88 or (12.8%) have completed additional higher education (either university or a Fachhochschule). Of the 88 who completed tertiary schooling, 59.1% were Swiss men, 36.4% were Swiss women.

The Canton of Fribourg school system provides one year of non-obligatory Kindergarten, followed by six years of Primary school. This is followed by three years of obligatory lower Secondary school where the students are separated according to ability and aptitude. Following the lower Secondary students may attend a three or four year optional upper Secondary school. The upper Secondary school is divided into gymnasium (university preparatory) and vocational programs. After they finish the upper Secondary program, students may choose to attend a Tertiary school or continue their apprenticeship.

During the 2010–11 school year, there were a total of 88 students attending 4 classes in Cheyres. A total of 159 students from the municipality attended any school, either in the municipality or outside of it. There were 2 kindergarten classes with a total of 42 students in the municipality. There were 2 primary classes with a total of 46 students. There were no lower secondary classes in the municipality, but 35 students attended lower secondary school in a neighboring municipality. There were no upper Secondary classes or vocational classes, but there were 2 upper Secondary students and 21 upper Secondary vocational students who attended classes in another municipality. There were no non-university Tertiary classes, but there were 2 specialized Tertiary students who attended classes in another municipality.

As of 2000, there were 21 students in Cheyres who came from another municipality, while 92 residents attended schools outside the municipality.

== Transportation ==
The municipality has a railway station, Cheyres, on the Fribourg–Yverdon line. It has regular service to Fribourg/Freiburg and Yverdon-les-Bains.
