= Vaumarcus =

- Former municipality
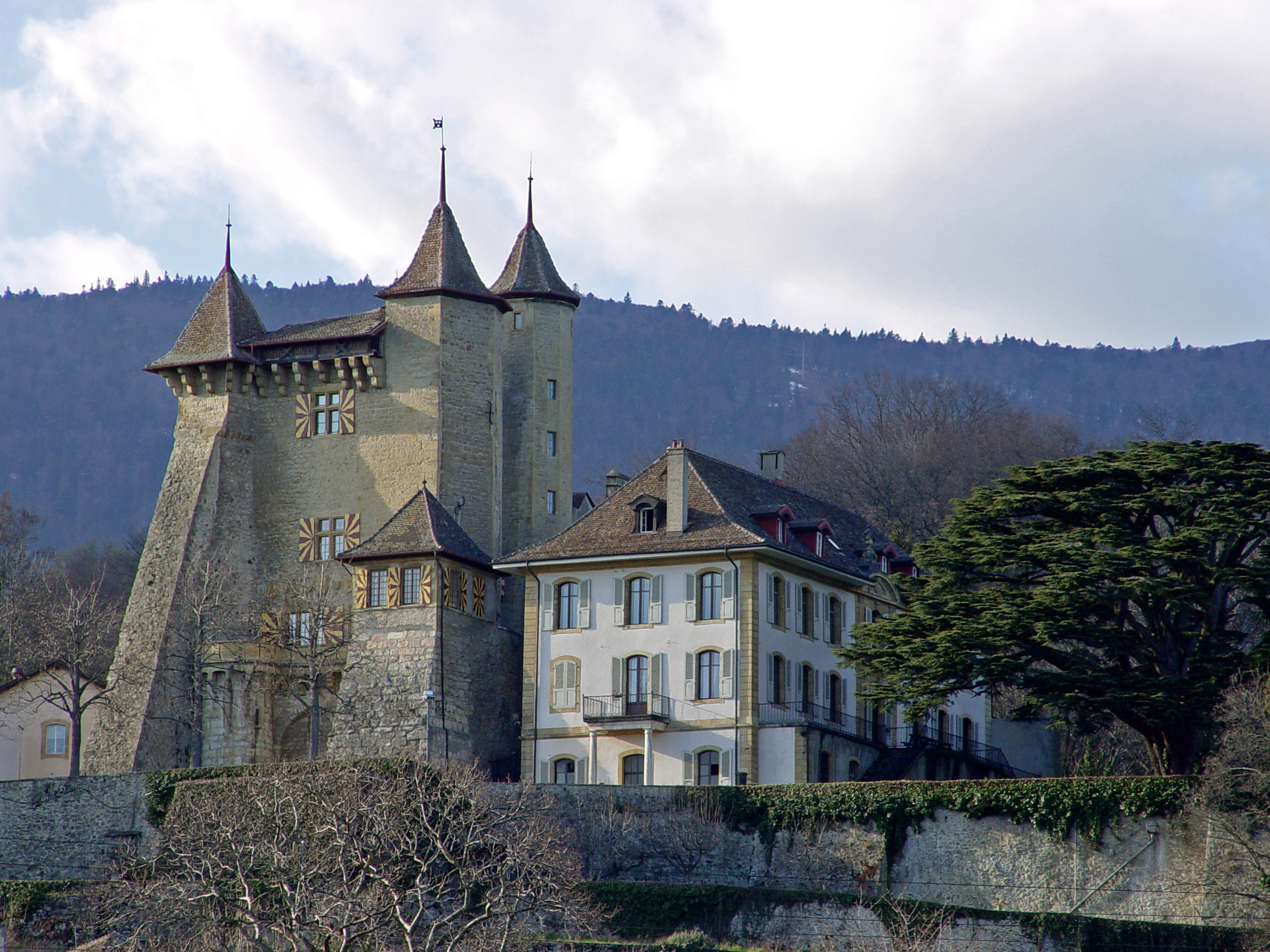
- Vaumarcus Castle

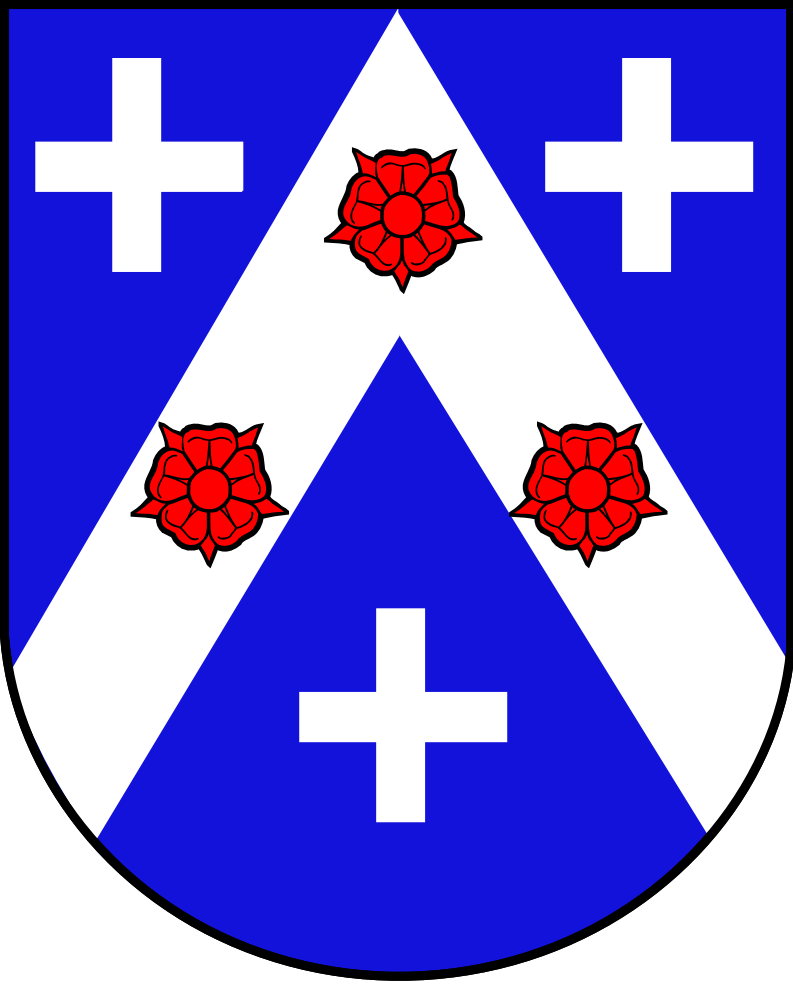
- Coat of arms
- Location of Vaumarcus
- Location within Switzerland Location within Canton of Neuchâtel
- Coordinates: 46°53′N 6°45′E
- Country: Switzerland
- Canton: Neuchâtel
- District: Boudry

Area
  - Total: 1.78 km^{2} (0.69 sq mi)
- Elevation: 447 m (1,467 ft)

Population (December 2007)
  - Total: 248
  - Density: 139/km^{2} (361/sq mi)
- Time zone: UTC+01:00 (CET)
  - Summer (DST): UTC+02:00 (CEST)
- Postal code: 2028
- SFOS number: 6415
- ISO 3166 code: CH-NE
- Surrounded by: Châbles (FR), Concise (VD), Estavayer-le-Lac (FR), Font (FR), Fresens, Mutrux (VD), Saint-Aubin-Sauges
- Twin towns: Vira (Gambarogno) (Switzerland)
- Website: SFSO statistics

Vaumarcus is a former municipality in the district of Boudry in the canton of Neuchâtel in Switzerland. On 1 January 2018 the former municipalities of Bevaix, Saint-Aubin-Sauges, Gorgier, Vaumarcus, Montalchez and Fresens merged into the new municipality of La Grande-Béroche.

== History ==
Vaumarcus was first mentioned in 1227 as Valmarcuel.

It was created in 1875 as a merger of Vaumarcus and Vernéaz, and was called Vaumarcus-Vernéaz until 1966.

== Geography ==
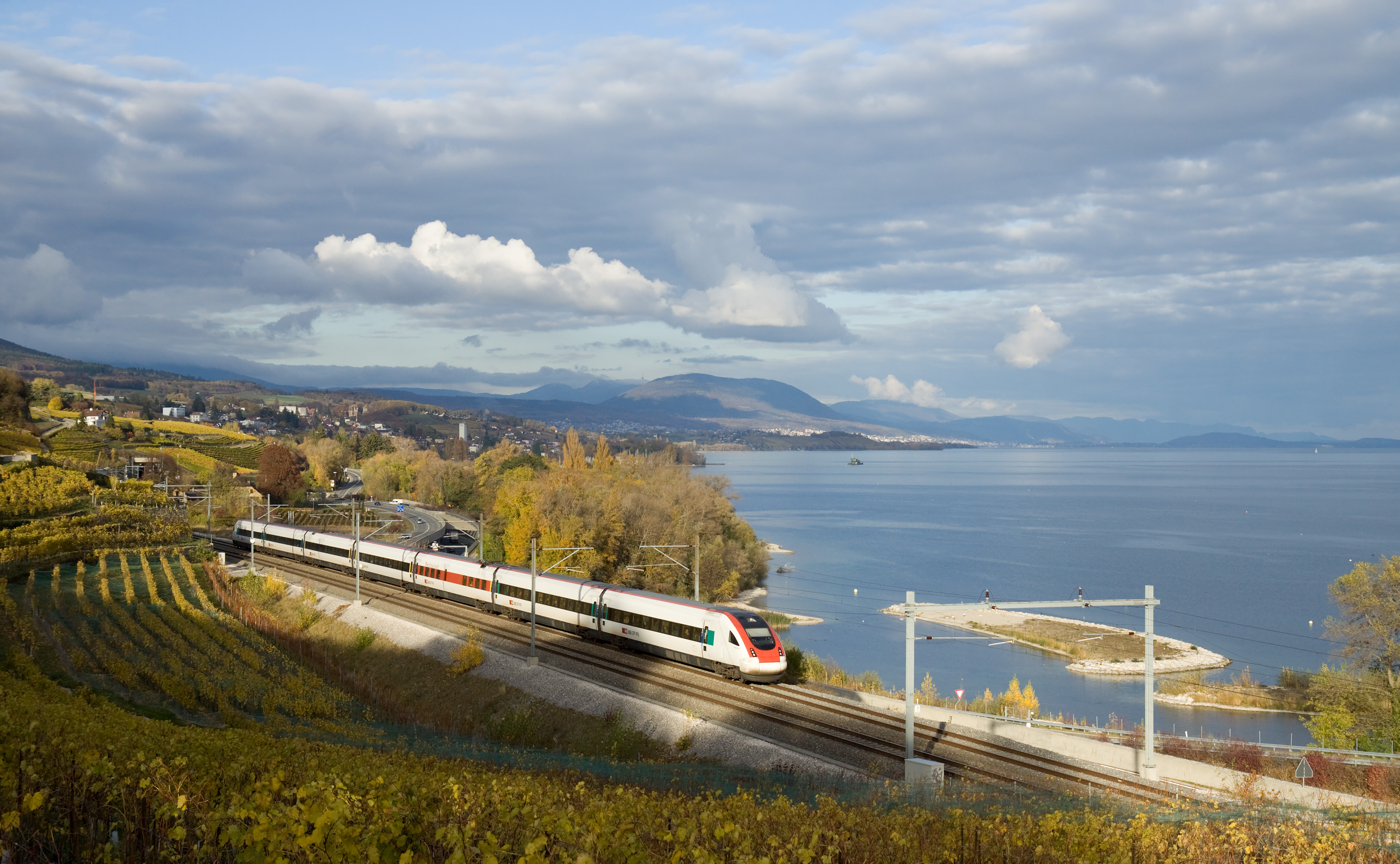
Railroad near Vaumarcus

Aerial view (1949)

Vaumarcus covers an area, as of 2009, of 1.8 square kilometers (0.69 mi^{2}). Of this area, 1.05 km^{2} (0.41 mi^{2}) or 59.0% is used for agricultural purposes, while 0.42 km^{2} (0.16 mi^{2}) or 23.6% is forested. Of the rest of the land, 0.3 km^{2} (0.12 mi^{2}) or 16.9% is settled (buildings or roads) and 0.01 km^{2} (2.5 acres) or 0.6% is unproductive land.

Of the built up area, housing and buildings make up 7.9% and transportation infrastructure makes up 7.9%. Power and water infrastructure as well as other special developed areas made up 1.1% of the area All of the forested land area is covered with heavy forests. Of the agricultural land, 33.7% is used for growing crops and 13.5% for pastures, while 11.8% is used for orchards or vine crops.

== Coat of arms ==
The blazon of the municipal coat of arms is Azure, between three Crosses couped Argent on a Chevron of the same three Roses Gules,

== Demographics ==
Vaumarcus has a population (as of December 2020) of 268. As of 2008, 16.9% of the population are foreign nationals. Over the last 10 years (2000–2010) the population has changed at a rate of 22.1%. It has changed at a rate of 13.1% in terms of migration and at a rate of 8.9% in terms of births and deaths.

Most of the population (as of 2000) speaks French (178 or 93.2%) as their first language, German being the second most common (7 or 3.7%) and Italian the third (4 or 2.1%).

As of 2008, the population is estimated to be 50.2% male and 49.8% female. The population is made up of 110 Swiss men (41.5% of the population) and 23 (8.7%) non-Swiss men. There are 110 Swiss women (41.5%) and 22 (8.3%) non-Swiss women. Of the population in the municipality, 49 or about 25.7% were born in Vaumarcus and lived there in 2000. There were 59 or 30.9% who were born in the same canton, while 54 or 28.3% were born somewhere else in Switzerland, and 26 or 13.6% were born outside of Switzerland.

As of 2000, children and teenagers (0–19 years old) make up 25.7% of the population, while adults (20–64 years old) make up 61.3% and seniors (over 64 years old) make up 13.1%.

As of 2000, there are 69 people who were single and never married in the municipality. There are 105 married individuals, 11 widows or widowers and 6 individuals who are divorced.

As of 2000, there are 77 private households in the municipality, and an average of 2.4 persons per household. There are 21 households that consist of only one person and 5 households with five or more people. In 2000, a total of 74 apartments (81.3% of the total) were permanently occupied, while 14 apartments (15.4%) were seasonally occupied and 3 apartments (3.3%) were empty.

The historical population is given in the following chart:

== Heritage sites of national significance ==
La Redoute Des Bourguignons, a prehistoric site and hallstatt tumulus, is listed as a Swiss heritage site of national significance.

== Politics ==
In the 2007 federal election the most popular party was the SVP which received 25.77% of the vote. The three other most popular parties were the LPS Party (23.13%), the SP (19.82%) and the FDP (16.52%). In the federal election, a total of 96 votes were cast, and the voter turnout was 56.5%.

== Economy ==
As of 2010, Vaumarcus has an unemployment rate of 4.4%. As of 2008, there are 22 people employed in the primary economic sector and about 6 businesses involved in this sector. 36 people are employed in the secondary sector and there are 6 businesses in this sector. 60 people are employed in the tertiary sector, with 11 businesses in this sector. There are 99 residents of the municipality who were employed in some capacity, of which females made up 39.4% of the workforce.

In 2008 the total number of full-time equivalent jobs was 97. The number of jobs in the primary sector was 15, all of which were in agriculture. The number of jobs in the secondary sector was 30 of which 28 or (93.3%) were in manufacturing and 1 was in construction. The number of jobs in the tertiary sector was 52. In the tertiary sector; 27 or 51.9% were in wholesale or retail sales or the repair of motor vehicles, 13 or 25.0% were in a hotel or restaurant, 3 or 5.8% were technical professionals or scientists, 1 was in education.

In 2000, there were 102 workers who commuted into the municipality and 58 workers who commuted away. The municipality is a net importer of workers, with about 1.8 workers entering the municipality for every one leaving. Of the working population, 3% used public transportation to get to work, and 64.6% used a private car.

== Religion ==
According to the 2000 census, 31 or 16.2% were Roman Catholic, while 109 or 57.1% belonged to the Swiss Reformed Church. From the rest of the population, there was 1 individual who belongs to the Christian Catholic Church, and there was 1 individual who belongs to another Christian church. There was 1 individual who was Islamic. 43 (or about 22.51% of the population) belonged to no church, are agnostic or atheist, and 5 individuals (or about 2.62% of the population) did not state their religious preferences.

== Education ==
In Vaumarcus about 79 or 41.4% of the population have completed non-mandatory upper secondary education, and 36 or (18.8%) have completed additional higher education (either university or a Fachhochschule). Of the 36 who completed tertiary schooling, 61.1% were Swiss men, 30.6% were Swiss women.

In the canton of Neuchâtel most municipalities provide two years of non-mandatory kindergarten, followed by five years of mandatory primary education. The next four years of mandatory secondary education is provided at thirteen larger secondary schools, which has many students travel away from their home municipality to attend. The kindergarten in Vaumarcus is combined with St-Aubin-Sauges. During the 2010–11 school year, there were 3 kindergarten classes with a total of 50 students between the municipalities. In the same year, there was one primary class with a total of 17 students.

As of 2000, there are 15 students from Vaumarcus who attend schools outside the municipality.
