= Seiry =

- Former municipality
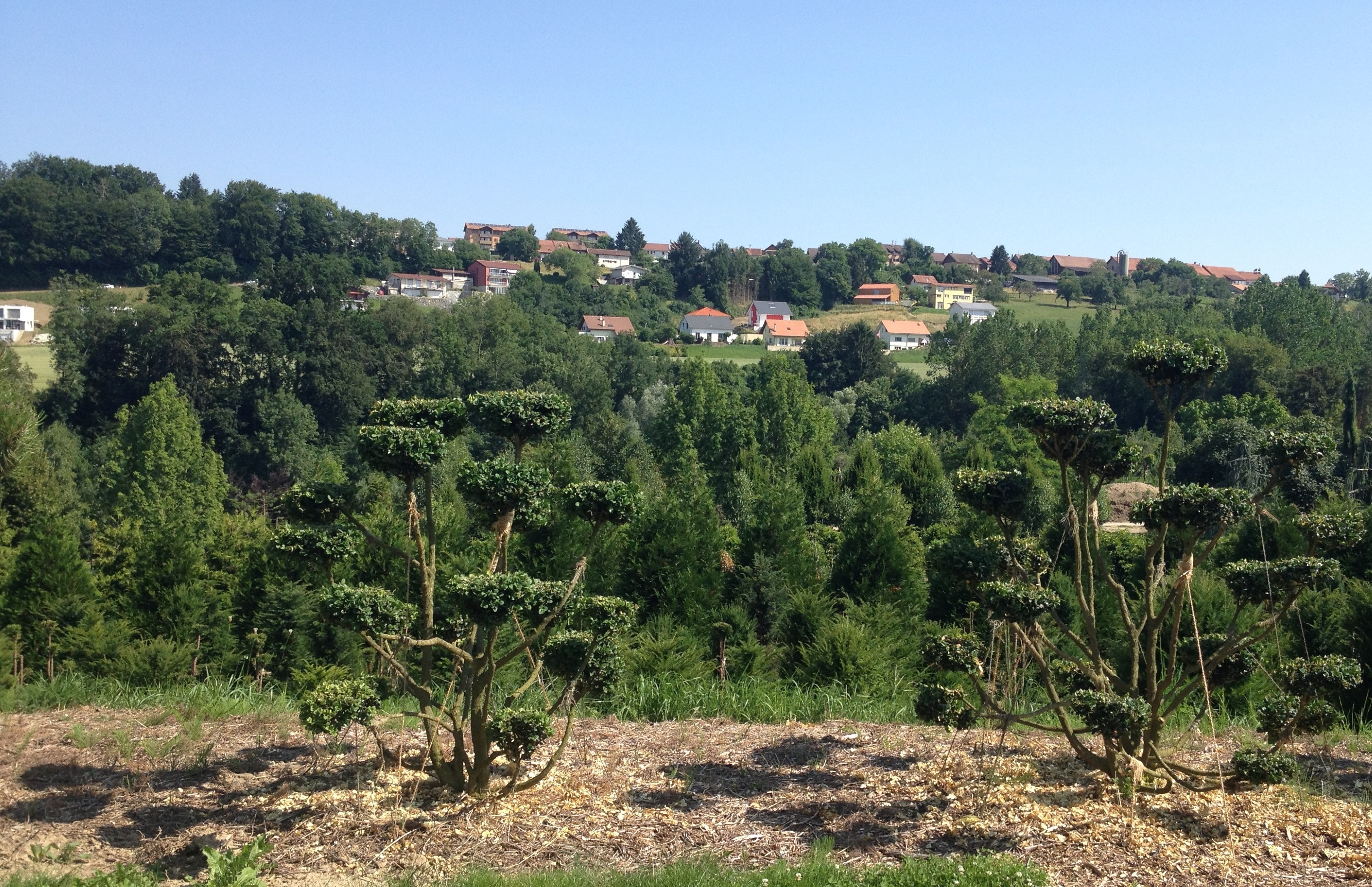

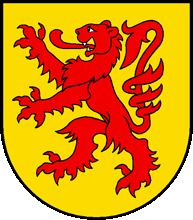
- Coat of arms
- Location of Seiry
- Location within Switzerland Location within Canton of Fribourg
- Coordinates: 46°48′N 6°49′E
- Country: Switzerland
- Canton: Fribourg
- District: Broye
- Municipality: Lully, Fribourg

Area
  - Total: 1.83 km^{2} (0.71 sq mi)
- Elevation: 605 m (1,985 ft)

Population (December 2005)
  - Total: 237
  - Density: 130/km^{2} (335/sq mi)
- Time zone: UTC+01:00 (CET)
  - Summer (DST): UTC+02:00 (CEST)
- Postal code: 1470
- SFOS number: 2042
- ISO 3166 code: CH-FR
- Surrounded by: Estavayer, Cheyres-Châbles, Les Montets
- Website

Seiry is a village lying within the municipality of Lully, in the canton of Fribourg, Switzerland. It formerly existed as an autonomous municipality, but on 1 January 2006 was merged with Bollion, into the larger Lully. Seiry first appears in 1180 CE as Seirie. The Historical Dictionary of Switzerland records a population peak of 209 in 1900, steadily dropping to 89 inhabitants in 1970, before rising again to 200 before the merger with Lully.

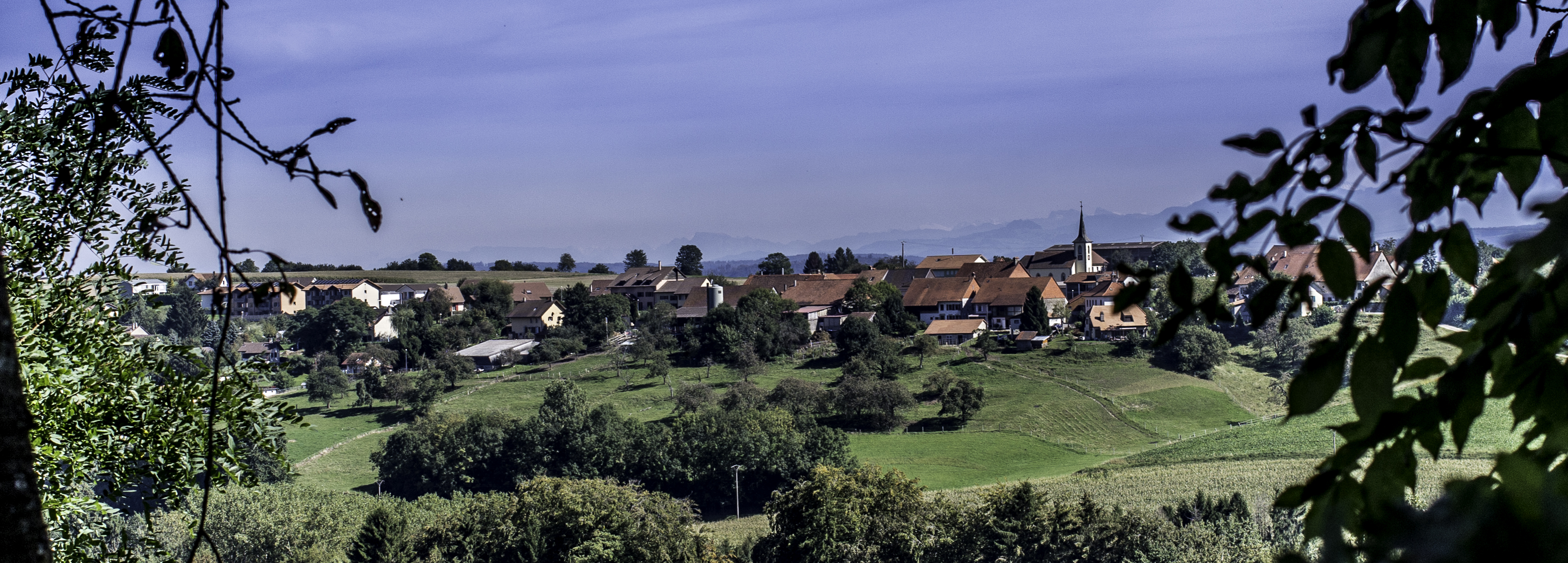
Seiry, early Fall
