= Châtillon, Fribourg =

Châtillon
- Municipality
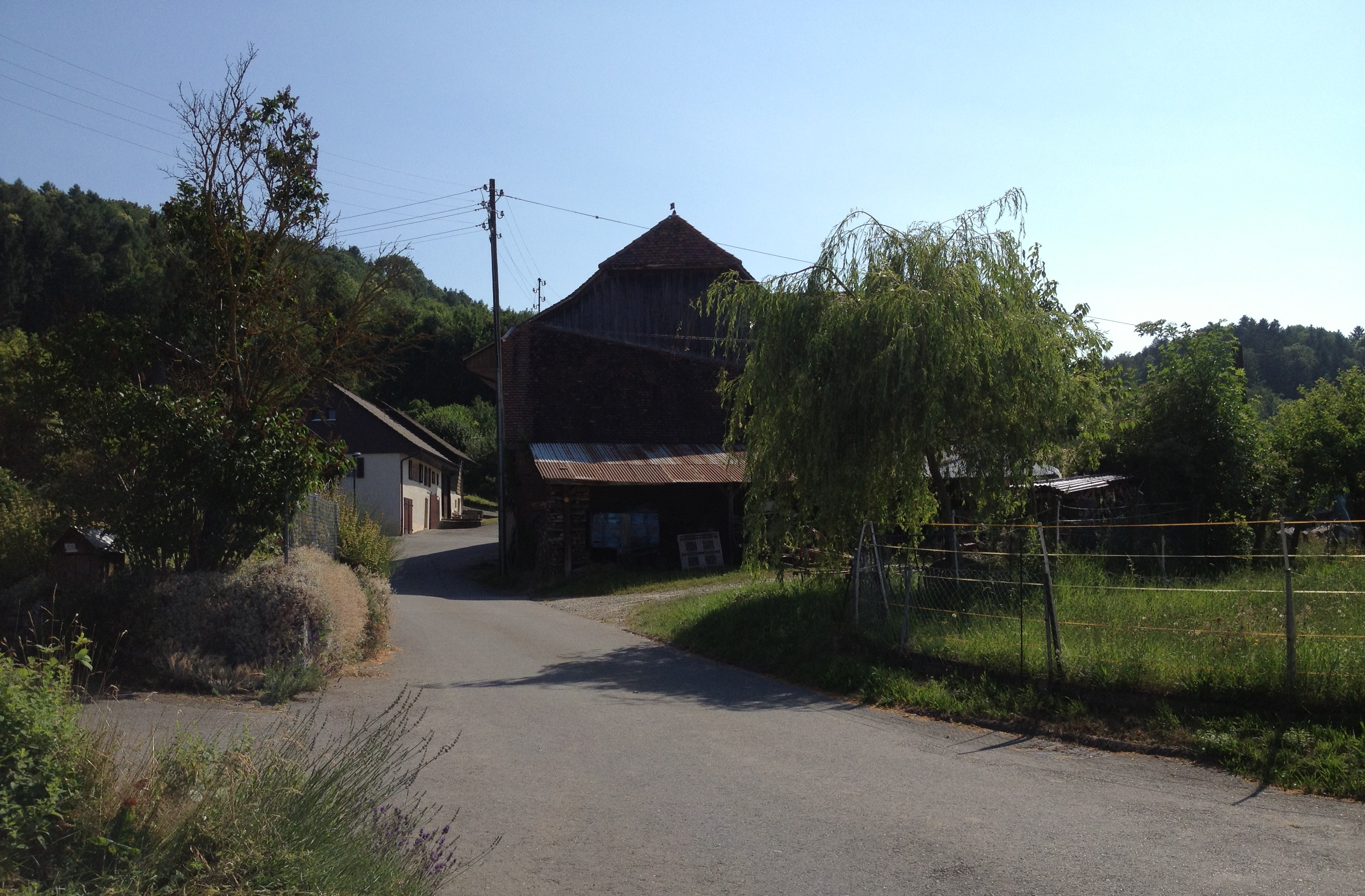

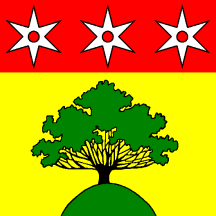
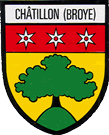
- Flag Coat of arms
- Location of Châtillon
- Location within Switzerland Location within Canton of Fribourg
- Coordinates: 46°50′N 6°50′E
- Country: Switzerland
- Canton: Fribourg
- District: Broye

Government
  - Mayor: Syndic

Area
  - Total: 1.30 km^{2} (0.50 sq mi)
- Elevation: 515 m (1,690 ft)

Population (December 2020)
  - Total: 520
  - Density: 400/km^{2} (1,000/sq mi)
- Time zone: UTC+01:00 (CET)
  - Summer (DST): UTC+02:00 (CEST)
- Postal code: 1473
- SFOS number: 2008
- ISO 3166 code: CH-FR
- Surrounded by: Châbles, Font
- Website: chatillon-broye.ch

Châtillon (French pronunciation: [ʃatijɔ̃]) is a municipality in the district of Broye in the canton of Fribourg in Switzerland.

== History ==
Châtillon became an independent municipality in 1801.

== Geography ==
Châtillon has an area, as of 2009, of 1.3 square kilometers (0.50 mi^{2}). Of this area, 0.72 km^{2} (0.28 mi^{2}) or 55.0% is used for agricultural purposes, while 0.36 km^{2} (0.14 mi^{2}) or 27.5% is forested. Of the rest of the land, 0.22 km^{2} (0.085 mi^{2}) or 16.8% is settled (buildings or roads).

Of the built up area, housing and buildings made up 13.7% and transportation infrastructure made up 1.5%. Out of the forested land, all of the forested land area is covered with heavy forests. Of the agricultural land, 36.6% is used for growing crops and 14.5% is pastures, while 3.8% is used for orchards or vine crops.

The municipality is located in the Broye district, above Font on the south-east side of Lake Neuchatel.

== Coat of arms ==
The blazon of the municipal coat of arms is Or, a Chestnut Tree Vert trunked Sable issuant from a Mount of the second and on a Chief Gules three Mullets Argent pierced.

== Demographics ==
Châtillon has a population (as of December 2020) of 520. As of 2008, 7.0% of the population are resident foreign nationals. Over the last 10 years (2000–2010) the population has changed at a rate of 24.4%. Migration accounted for 26.2%, while births and deaths accounted for 2.2%.

Most of the population (as of 2000) speaks French (236 or 86.1%) as their first language, German is the second most common (31 or 11.3%) and Italian is the third (6 or 2.2%).

As of 2008, the population was 50.7% male and 49.3% female. The population was made up of 164 Swiss men (47.3% of the population) and 12 (3.5%) non-Swiss men. There were 162 Swiss women (46.7%) and 9 (2.6%) non-Swiss women. Of the population in the municipality, 70 or about 25.5% were born in Châtillon and lived there in 2000. There were 76 or 27.7% who were born in the same canton, while 94 or 34.3% were born somewhere else in Switzerland, and 33 or 12.0% were born outside of Switzerland.

The age distribution, as of 2000, in Châtillon is; 43 children or 15.7% of the population are between 0 and 9 years old and 28 teenagers or 10.2% are between 10 and 19. Of the adult population, 32 people or 11.7% of the population are between 20 and 29 years old. 46 people or 16.8% are between 30 and 39, 41 people or 15.0% are between 40 and 49, and 35 people or 12.8% are between 50 and 59. The senior population distribution is 23 people or 8.4% of the population are between 60 and 69 years old, 21 people or 7.7% are between 70 and 79, there are 4 people or 1.5% who are between 80 and 89, and there is 1 person who is 90 and older.

As of 2000, there were 112 people who were single and never married in the municipality. There were 145 married individuals, 7 widows or widowers and 10 individuals who are divorced.

As of 2000, there were 106 private households in the municipality, and an average of 2.5 persons per household. There were 25 households that consist of only one person and 7 households with five or more people. In 2000, a total of 99 apartments (66.0% of the total) were permanently occupied, while 44 apartments (29.3%) were seasonally occupied and 7 apartments (4.7%) were empty. As of 2009, the construction rate of new housing units was 5.8 new units per 1000 residents.

The historical population is given in the following chart:

== Heritage sites of national significance ==
The La Vuardaz, a Gallo-Roman villa is listed as a Swiss heritage site of national significance.

== Politics ==
In the 2011 federal election the most popular party was the CVP which received 28.6% of the vote. The next three most popular parties were the SVP (25.8%), the SP (21.0%) and the FDP (9.2%).

The CVP improved their position in Châtillon rising to first, from second in 2007 (with 23.8%) The SVP moved from first in 2007 (with 31.8%) to second in 2011, the SPS moved from fourth in 2007 (with 14.7%) to third and the FDP moved from third in 2007 (with 19.7%) to fourth. A total of 153 votes were cast in this election, of which 3 or 2.0% were invalid.

== Economy ==
As of 2010, Châtillon had an unemployment rate of 3.9%. As of 2008, there were 14 people employed in the primary economic sector and about 4 businesses involved in this sector. No one was employed in the secondary sector. 7 people were employed in the tertiary sector, with 4 businesses in this sector. There were 141 residents of the municipality who were employed in some capacity, of which females made up 36.2% of the workforce.

In 2008 the total number of full-time equivalent jobs was 17. The number of jobs in the primary sector was 11, all of which were in agriculture. There were no jobs in the secondary sector. The number of jobs in the tertiary sector was 6; 2 were in wholesale or retail sales or the repair of motor vehicles, 1 was a technical professional or scientist and 2 were in education.

In 2000, there were 3 workers who commuted into the municipality and 117 workers who commuted away. The municipality is a net exporter of workers, with about 39.0 workers leaving the municipality for every one entering. Of the working population, 5.7% used public transportation to get to work, and 78% used a private car.

== Religion ==
From the 2000 census, 176 or 64.2% were Roman Catholic, while 54 or 19.7% belonged to the Swiss Reformed Church. Of the rest of the population, there were 34 individuals (or about 12.41% of the population) who belonged to another Christian church. 26 (or about 9.49% of the population) belonged to no church, are agnostic or atheist.

== Education ==
In Châtillon about 120 or (43.8%) of the population have completed non-mandatory upper secondary education, and 36 or (13.1%) have completed additional higher education (either university or a Fachhochschule). Of the 36 who completed tertiary schooling, 58.3% were Swiss men, 27.8% were Swiss women.

The Canton of Fribourg school system provides one year of non-obligatory Kindergarten, followed by six years of Primary school. This is followed by three years of obligatory lower Secondary school where the students are separated according to ability and aptitude. Following the lower Secondary students may attend a three or four year optional upper Secondary school. The upper Secondary school is divided into gymnasium (university preparatory) and vocational programs. After they finish the upper Secondary program, students may choose to attend a Tertiary school or continue their apprenticeship.

During the 2010–11 school year, there were a total of 42 students attending 2 classes in Châtillon. A total of 53 students from the municipality attended any school, either in the municipality or outside of it. There were no kindergarten classes in the municipality, but 7 students attended kindergarten in a neighboring municipality. There were 2 primary classes with a total of 42 students. There were no lower secondary classes in the municipality, but 9 students attended lower secondary school in a neighboring municipality. There were no upper Secondary classes or vocational classes, but there was one upper Secondary student and 4 upper Secondary vocational students who attended classes in another municipality. There were no non-university Tertiary classes, but there was one non-university Tertiary student and 3 specialized Tertiary students who attended classes in another municipality.

As of 2000, there were 17 students in Châtillon who came from another municipality, while 34 residents attended schools outside the municipality.
