= Bollion =

- Former municipality
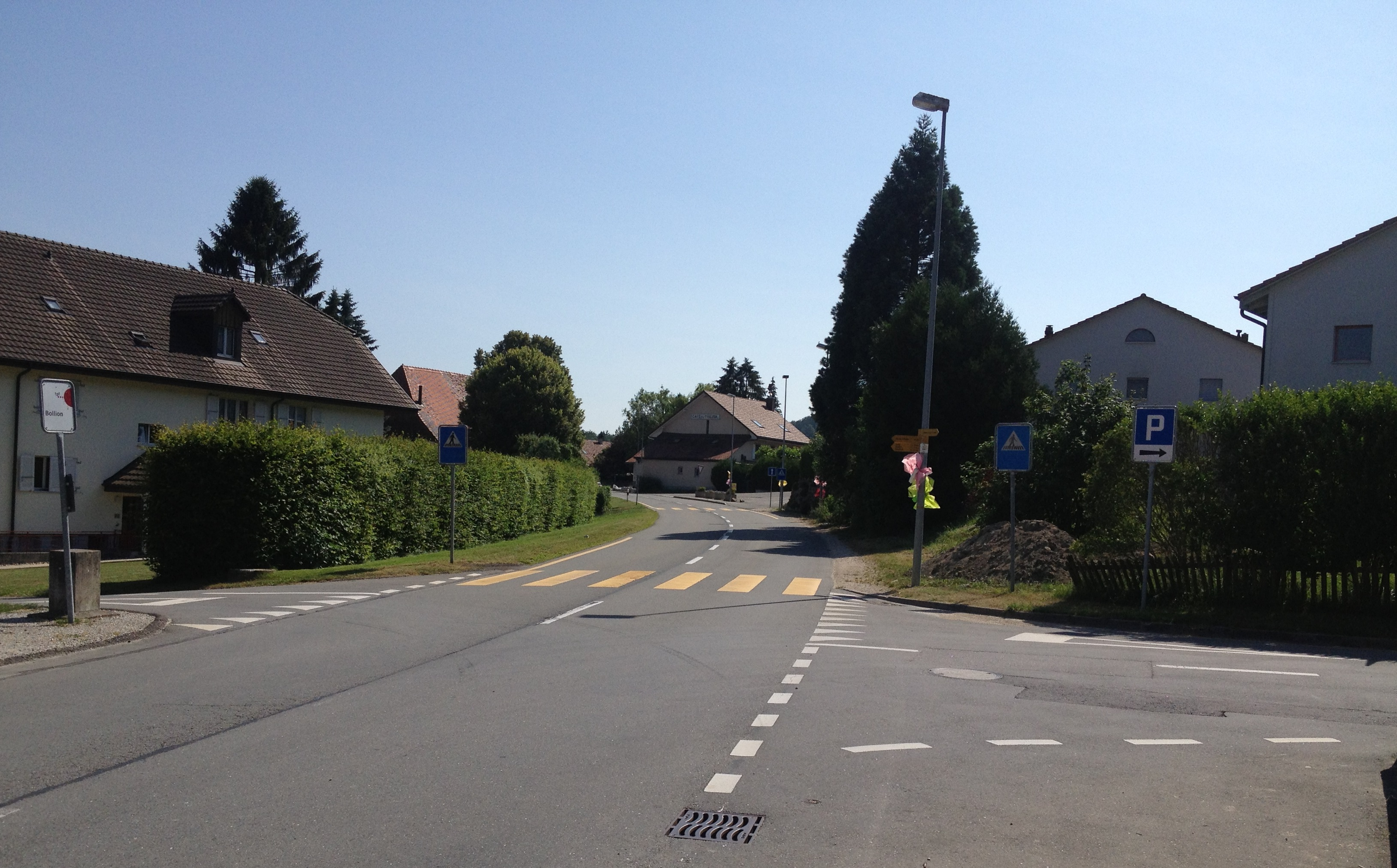

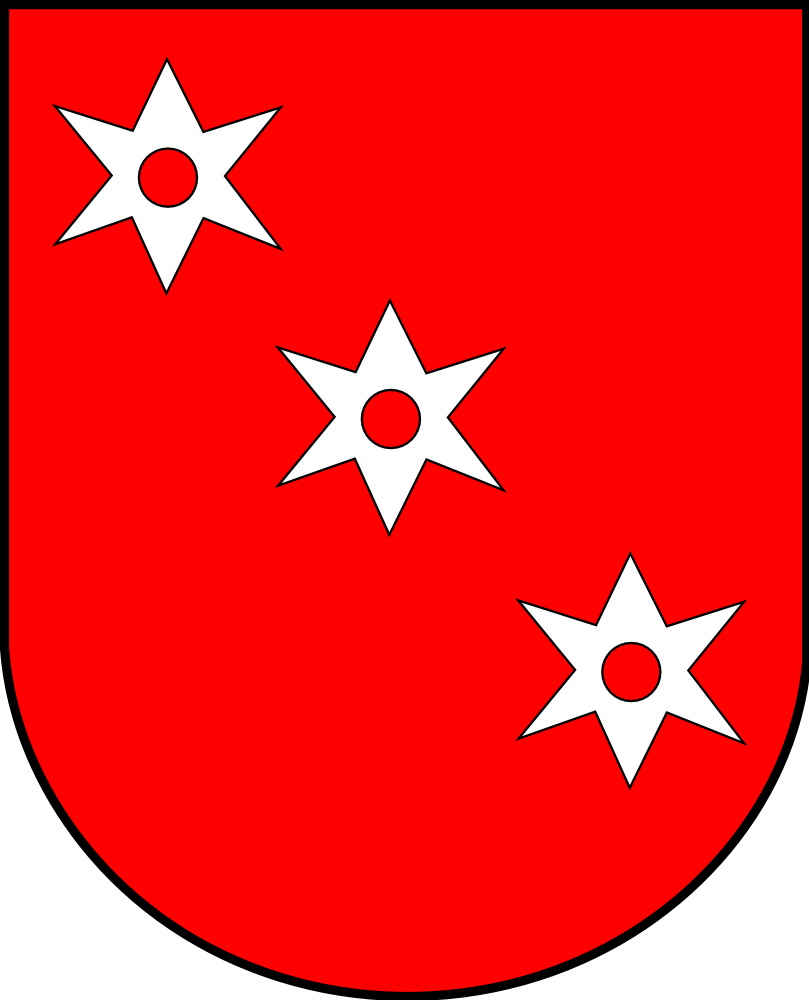
- Flag Coat of arms
- Location of Bollion
- Location within Switzerland Location within Canton of Fribourg
- Coordinates: 46°48′N 6°50′E
- Country: Switzerland
- Canton: Fribourg
- District: Broye
- Municipality: Lully, Fribourg

Area
  - Total: 0.87 km^{2} (0.34 sq mi)
- Elevation: 566 m (1,857 ft)

Population (December 2005)
  - Total: 151
  - Density: 170/km^{2} (450/sq mi)
- Time zone: UTC+01:00 (CET)
  - Summer (DST): UTC+02:00 (CEST)
- Postal code: 1470
- SFOS number: 2003
- ISO 3166 code: CH-FR
- Surrounded by: Estavayer, Cheyres-Châbles, Les Montets
- Website

Bollion is a village lying within the municipality of Lully, in the canton of Fribourg, Switzerland. It formerly existed as an autonomous municipality, but on 1 January 2006 was merged with Seiry, into the larger Lully.
