= Chandon (Fribourg) =

Village in Switzerland

Coordinates: 46.8388°N 7.04696°E

Chandon is a locality and former municipality in the canton of Fribourg in Switzerland. On 1 January 1994 it merged into Léchelles and on 1 January 2016, the former municipalities of Domdidier, Dompierre, Léchelles and Russy merged to form Belmont-Broye.
