= Domdidier railway station =

Railway station in Belmont-Broye, Switzerland

Domdidier
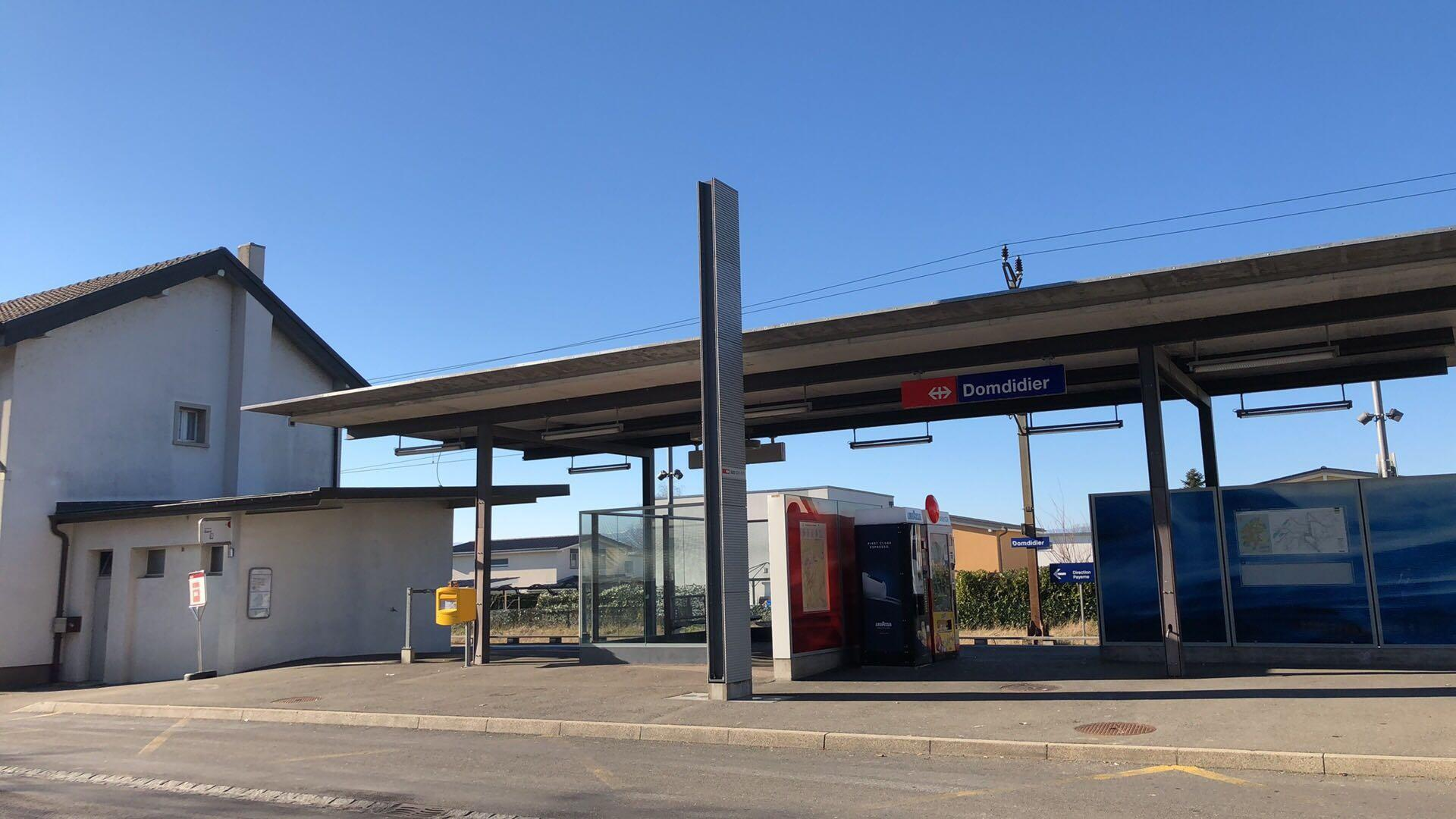
- The station platform in 2019

General information
- Location: Belmont-Broye; Switzerland
- Coordinates: 46°52′07″N 7°00′41″E
- Elevation: 439 m (1,440 ft)
- Owner: Swiss Federal Railways
- Line: Palézieux–Lyss railway line
- Distance: 66.2 km (41.1 mi) from Lausanne
- Platforms: 1 side platform
- Tracks: 1
- Train operators: BLS AG; Swiss Federal Railways
- Connections: Transports publics fribourgeois buses

Construction
- Parking: Yes (67 spaces)
- Cycle facilities: Yes (29 spaces)
- Accessible: No

Other information
- Station code: 8504125 (DOM)
- Fare zone: 57 (frimobil); 131 (mobilis)

Passengers
- 2023: 660 per weekday (BLS, SBB)

Services
Preceding station	RER Vaud	Following station
Dompierre FR towards Allaman	R9	Avenches towards Murten/Morat
Preceding station	Bern S-Bahn	Following station
Dompierre FR towards Payerne	S52 Limited service	Avenches towards Bern
Location

Domdidier railway station (French: Gare de Domdidier) is a railway station in the village of Domdidier, within the municipality of Belmont-Broye, in the Swiss canton of Fribourg. It is an intermediate stop on the standard gauge Palézieux–Lyss line of Swiss Federal Railways.

== Services ==
As of the December 2024 timetable change, the following services stop at Domdidier:

- RER Vaud R9: hourly service between Allaman and Murten/Morat.
- Bern S-Bahn S52: limited service between Bern and Payerne.
