= Dompierre, Fribourg =

Dompierre
- Former municipality
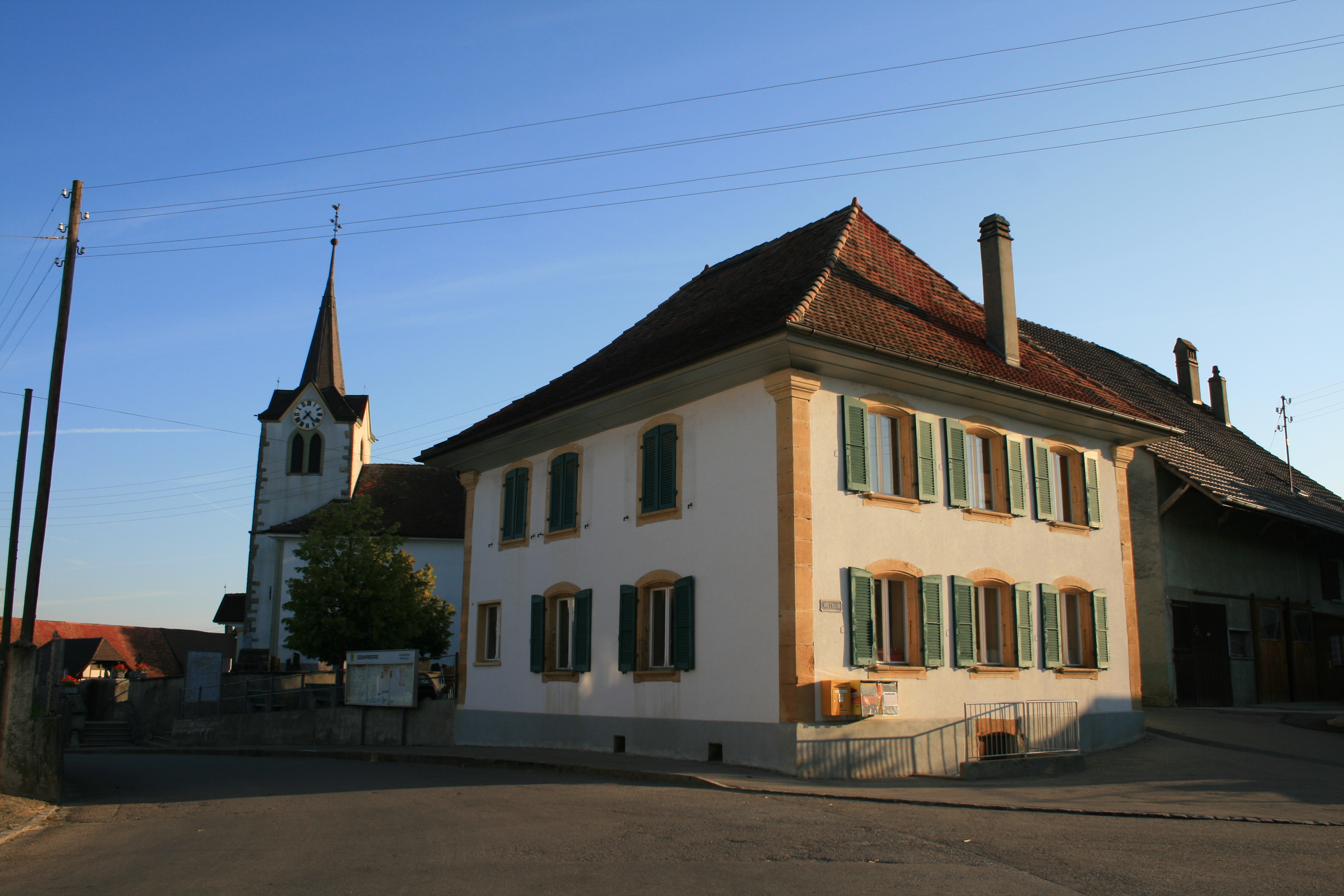
- Dompierre village

- Flag Coat of arms
- Location of Dompierre
- Location within Switzerland Location within Canton of Fribourg
- Coordinates: 46°51′N 6°59′E
- Country: Switzerland
- Canton: Fribourg
- District: Broye

Government
  - Mayor: Syndic

Area
  - Total: 4.5 km^{2} (1.7 sq mi)
- Elevation: 459 m (1,506 ft)

Population (Dec 2014)
  - Total: 994
  - Density: 220/km^{2} (570/sq mi)
- Time zone: UTC+01:00 (CET)
  - Summer (DST): UTC+02:00 (CEST)
- Postal code: 1563
- SFOS number: 2014
- ISO 3166 code: CH-FR
- Surrounded by: Corcelles-près-Payerne (VD), Domdidier, Missy (VD), Russy
- Website: belmont-broye.ch

Dompierre (French pronunciation: [dɔ̃pjɛʁ]; Arpitan: Dompierro, locally Donpyérou [dɔ̃ˈpjeʁu]) is a former municipality in the district of Broye of the Canton of Fribourg, Switzerland. On 1 January 2016, the former municipalities of Domdidier, Dompierre, Léchelles and Russy merged to form Belmont-Broye.

== History ==
Dompierre is first mentioned in 1137 as Donperre.

== Geography ==
Aerial view (1964)

Dompierre had an area, as of 2009, of 4.5 square kilometers (1.7 mi^{2}). Of this area, 3.88 km^{2} (1.50 mi^{2}) or 87.2% is used for agricultural purposes, while 0.04 km^{2} (0.015 mi^{2}) or 0.9% is forested. Of the rest of the land, 0.45 km^{2} (0.17 mi^{2}) or 10.1% is settled (buildings or roads), 0.06 km^{2} (15 acres) or 1.3% is either rivers or lakes and 0.01 km^{2} (2.5 acres) or 0.2% is unproductive land.

Of the built up area, housing and buildings made up 4.5% and transportation infrastructure made up 4.0%. Out of the forested land, all of the forested land area is covered with heavy forests. Of the agricultural land, 75.5% is used for growing crops and 10.3% is pastures, while 1.3% is used for orchards or vine crops. All the water in the municipality is flowing water.

The former municipality is located in the Broye district, between Avenches and Payerne.

== Coat of arms ==
The blazon of the municipal coat of arms is Or, a Lion rampant Sable langued Gules holding a Key of the last.

== Demographics ==
Dompierre had a population (as of 2014) of 994. As of 2008, 18.2% of the population are resident foreign nationals. Over the last 10 years (2000–2010) the population has changed at a rate of 25.5%. Migration accounted for 20.8%, while births and deaths accounted for 2.2%.

Most of the population (as of 2000) speaks French (556 or 94.7%) as their first language, German is the second most common (14 or 2.4%) and Albanian is the third (8 or 1.4%). There are 5 people who speak Italian.

As of 2008, the population was 52.6% male and 47.4% female. The population was made up of 311 Swiss men (42.3% of the population) and 76 (10.3%) non-Swiss men. There were 285 Swiss women (38.7%) and 64 (8.7%) non-Swiss women. Of the population in the municipality, 260 or about 44.3% were born in Dompierre and lived there in 2000. There were 143 or 24.4% who were born in the same canton, while 116 or 19.8% were born somewhere else in Switzerland, and 62 or 10.6% were born outside of Switzerland.

The age distribution, as of 2000, in Dompierre is; 92 children or 15.7% of the population are between 0 and 9 years old and 74 teenagers or 12.6% are between 10 and 19. Of the adult population, 75 people or 12.8% of the population are between 20 and 29 years old. 102 people or 17.4% are between 30 and 39, 79 people or 13.5% are between 40 and 49, and 70 people or 11.9% are between 50 and 59. The senior population distribution is 43 people or 7.3% of the population are between 60 and 69 years old, 37 people or 6.3% are between 70 and 79, there are 14 people or 2.4% who are between 80 and 89, and there is 1 person who is 90 and older.

As of 2000, there were 255 people who were single and never married in the municipality. There were 281 married individuals, 30 widows or widowers and 21 individuals who are divorced.

As of 2000, there were 225 private households in the municipality, and an average of 2.6 persons per household. There were 55 households that consist of only one person and 23 households with five or more people. In 2000, a total of 220 apartments (86.3% of the total) were permanently occupied, while 22 apartments (8.6%) were seasonally occupied and 13 apartments (5.1%) were empty. As of 2009, the construction rate of new housing units was 4 new units per 1000 residents. The vacancy rate for the municipality, in 2010, was 1.27%.

The historical population is given in the following chart:

== Sights ==
The entire village of Dompierre is designated as part of the Inventory of Swiss Heritage Sites.

== Politics ==
In the 2011 federal election the most popular party was the SVP which received 25.6% of the vote. The next three most popular parties were the SP (23.6%), the CVP (20.2%) and the FDP (14.1%). The SVP lost about -546.0% of the vote when compared to the 2007 Federal election. The SPS moved from third in 2007 (with 20.6%) to second in 2011, the CVP moved from second in 2007 (with 22.5%) to third and the FDP gained popularity (10.1% in 2007). A total of 189 votes were cast in this election, of which 4 or 2.1% were invalid.

== Economy ==
As of 2010, Dompierre had an unemployment rate of 3.1%. As of 2008, there were 60 people employed in the primary economic sector and about 19 businesses involved in this sector. 35 people were employed in the secondary sector and there were 9 businesses in this sector. 48 people were employed in the tertiary sector, with 19 businesses in this sector. There were 291 residents of the municipality who were employed in some capacity, of which females made up 39.9% of the workforce.

In 2008 the total number of full-time equivalent jobs was 107. The number of jobs in the primary sector was 36, all of which were in agriculture. The number of jobs in the secondary sector was 33 of which 2 or (6.1%) were in manufacturing and 29 (87.9%) were in construction. The number of jobs in the tertiary sector was 38. In the tertiary sector; 13 or 34.2% were in wholesale or retail sales or the repair of motor vehicles, 1 was in the movement and storage of goods, 3 or 7.9% were in a hotel or restaurant, 8 or 21.1% were in education.

In 2000, there were 18 workers who commuted into the municipality and 205 workers who commuted away. The municipality is a net exporter of workers, with about 11.4 workers leaving the municipality for every one entering. Of the working population, 6.9% used public transportation to get to work, and 64.9% used a private car.

== Religion ==
From the 2000 census, 454 or 77.3% were Roman Catholic, while 56 or 9.5% belonged to the Swiss Reformed Church. Of the rest of the population, there were 2 individuals (or about 0.34% of the population) who belonged to the Christian Catholic Church, and there were 32 individuals (or about 5.45% of the population) who belonged to another Christian church. There were 23 (or about 3.92% of the population) who were Islamic. 27 (or about 4.60% of the population) belonged to no church, are agnostic or atheist, and 9 individuals (or about 1.53% of the population) did not answer the question.

== Education ==
In Dompierre about 200 or (34.1%) of the population have completed non-mandatory upper secondary education, and 26 or (4.4%) have completed additional higher education (either university or a Fachhochschule). Of the 26 who completed tertiary schooling, 76.9% were Swiss men, 15.4% were Swiss women.

The Canton of Fribourg school system provides one year of non-obligatory Kindergarten, followed by six years of Primary school. This is followed by three years of obligatory lower Secondary school where the students are separated according to ability and aptitude. Following the lower Secondary students may attend a three or four year optional upper Secondary school. The upper Secondary school is divided into gymnasium (university preparatory) and vocational programs. After they finish the upper Secondary program, students may choose to attend a Tertiary school or continue their apprenticeship.

During the 2010–11 school year, there were a total of 72 students attending 4 classes in Dompierre. A total of 142 students from the municipality attended any school, either in the municipality or outside of it. There was one kindergarten class with a total of 24 students in the municipality. The municipality had 3 primary classes and 48 students. During the same year, there were no lower secondary classes in the municipality, but 34 students attended lower secondary school in a neighboring municipality. There were no upper Secondary classes or vocational classes, but there were 18 upper Secondary vocational students who attended classes in another municipality. The municipality had no non-university Tertiary classes, but there were 2 non-university Tertiary students and 8 specialized Tertiary students who attended classes in another municipality.

As of 2000, there were 13 students in Dompierre who came from another municipality, while 48 residents attended schools outside the municipality.
