= Léchelles =

- Former municipality
- Coat of arms
- Location of Léchelles
- Location within Switzerland Location within Canton of Fribourg
- Coordinates: 46°50′N 7°1′E
- Country: Switzerland
- Canton: Fribourg
- District: Broye

Government
  - Mayor: Syndic

Area
  - Total: 8.75 km^{2} (3.38 sq mi)
- Elevation: 545 m (1,788 ft)

Population (Dec 2014)
  - Total: 751
  - Density: 85.8/km^{2} (222/sq mi)
- Time zone: UTC+01:00 (CET)
  - Summer (DST): UTC+02:00 (CEST)
- Postal code: 1773
- SFOS number: 2024
- ISO 3166 code: CH-FR
- Surrounded by: Domdidier, Grolley, Misery-Courtion, Montagny, Oleyres (VD), Ponthaux, Russy
- Website: belmont-broye.ch

Léchelles (French: [leʃɛl]; Arpitan: Lèchiéles [lɛˈtʃilɛ]) is a former municipality in the district of Broye, in the canton of Fribourg, Switzerland. On 1 September 1994 the former municipality of Chandon merged into the municipality of Léchelles, keeping the name Léchelles. On 1 January 2016, the former municipalities of Domdidier, Dompierre, Léchelles and Russy merged to form Belmont-Broye.

== History ==
Léchelles is first mentioned in 1243 as Leschieres. The municipality was formerly known by its German name Leitern, however, that name is no longer used.

== Geography ==
Léchelles had an area, as of 2009, of 8.8 square kilometers (3.4 mi^{2}). Of this area, 4.82 km^{2} (1.86 mi^{2}) or 55.1% is used for agricultural purposes, while 3.32 km^{2} (1.28 mi^{2}) or 37.9% is forested. Of the rest of the land, 0.58 km^{2} (0.22 mi^{2}) or 6.6% is settled (buildings or roads), 0.03 km^{2} (7.4 acres) or 0.3% is either rivers or lakes.

Of the built up area, housing and buildings made up 3.1% and transportation infrastructure made up 2.7%. Out of the forested land, 36.7% of the total land area is heavily forested and 1.3% is covered with orchards or small clusters of trees. Of the agricultural land, 27.9% is used for growing crops and 26.2% is pastures. All the water in the municipality is flowing water.

The former municipality is located in the Broye district, between Fribourg and Payerne. It consists of the linear village of Léchelles and the village of Chandon.

== Coat of arms ==
The blazon of the municipal coat of arms is Azure a Bend wavy Argent between two Mullets of the same. The coat of arms is new from the 1994 merger. The wavy stripe comes from the coat of arms of Chandon, while the two stars represent the two municipalities.

== Demographics ==
Léchelles had a population (as of 2014) of 751. As of 2008, 10.3% of the population are resident foreign nationals. Over the last 10 years (2000–2010) the population has changed at a rate of 16%. Migration accounted for 11.6%, while births and deaths accounted for 4.2%.

Most of the population (as of 2000) speaks French (457 or 90.9%) as their first language, German is the second most common (41 or 8.2%) and English is the third (3 or 0.6%). There is 1 person who speaks Italian.

As of 2008, the population was 50.1% male and 49.9% female. The population was made up of 266 Swiss men (44.3% of the population) and 35 (5.8%) non-Swiss men. There were 266 Swiss women (44.3%) and 34 (5.7%) non-Swiss women. Of the population in the municipality, 201 or about 40.0% were born in Léchelles and lived there in 2000. There were 177 or 35.2% who were born in the same canton, while 86 or 17.1% were born somewhere else in Switzerland, and 26 or 5.2% were born outside of Switzerland.

The age distribution, as of 2000, in Léchelles is; 75 children or 14.9% of the population are between 0 and 9 years old and 58 teenagers or 11.5% are between 10 and 19. Of the adult population, 69 people or 13.7% of the population are between 20 and 29 years old. 77 people or 15.3% are between 30 and 39, 69 people or 13.7% are between 40 and 49, and 62 people or 12.3% are between 50 and 59. The senior population distribution is 44 people or 8.7% of the population are between 60 and 69 years old, 31 people or 6.2% are between 70 and 79, there are 17 people or 3.4% who are between 80 and 89, and there is 1 person who is 90 and older.

As of 2000, there were 222 people who were single and never married in the municipality. There were 242 married individuals, 22 widows or widowers and 17 individuals who are divorced.

As of 2000, there were 194 private households in the municipality, and an average of 2.5 persons per household. There were 60 households that consist of only one person and 18 households with five or more people. In 2000, a total of 188 apartments (90.8% of the total) were permanently occupied, while 13 apartments (6.3%) were seasonally occupied and 6 apartments (2.9%) were empty. As of 2009, the construction rate of new housing units was 3.3 new units per 1000 residents. The vacancy rate for the municipality, in 2010, was 0.38%.

The historical population is given in the following chart:

== Heritage sites of national significance ==
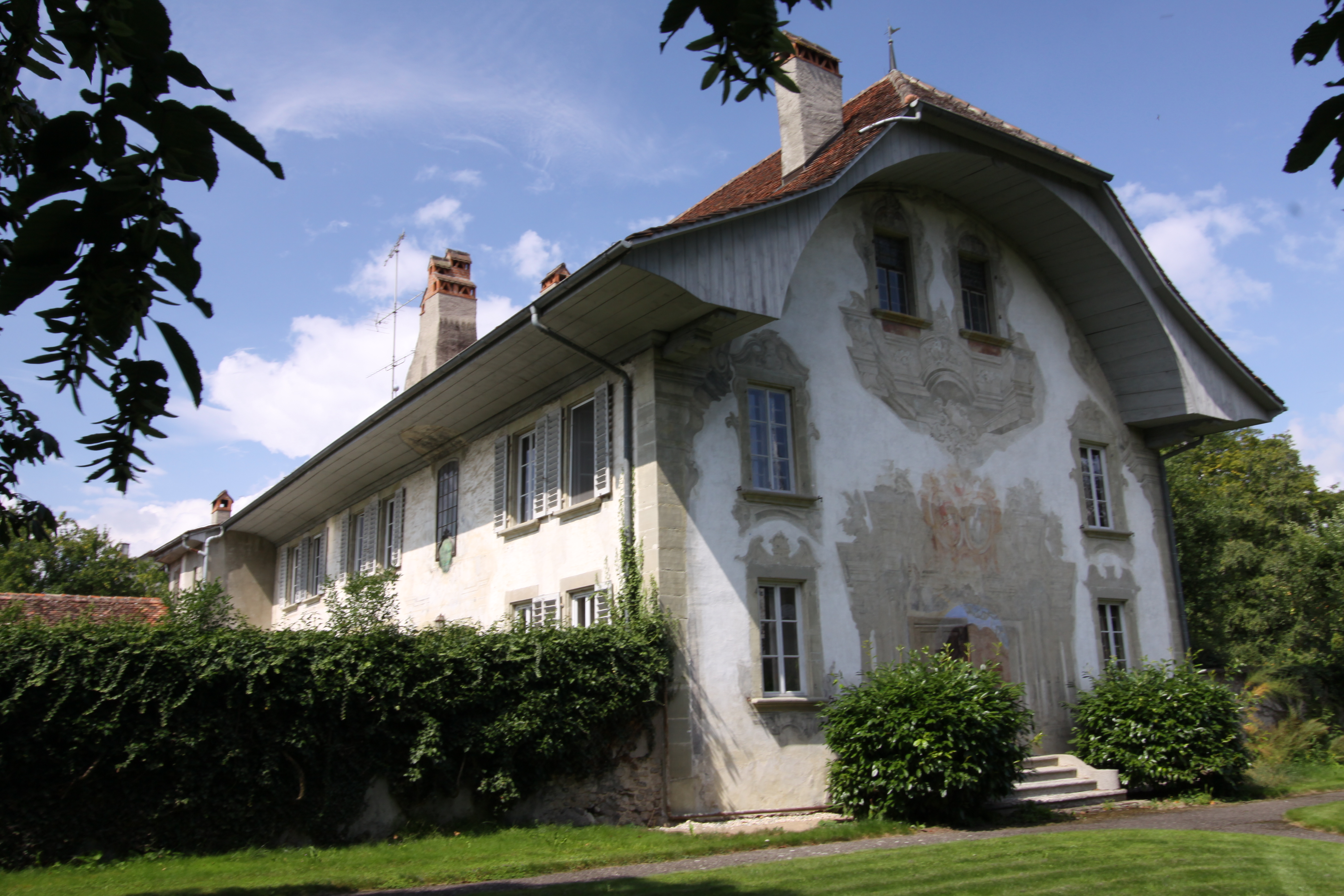
Mansion De Gottrau

The Mansion De Gottrau is listed as a Swiss heritage site of national significance.

== Politics ==
In the 2011 federal election the most popular party was the SP which received 37.5% of the vote. The next three most popular parties were the CVP (21.1%), the SVP (18.0%) and the FDP (8.4%).

The SPS gained an additional 8.6% of the vote from the 2007 Federal election (28.9% in 2007 vs 37.5% in 2011). The CVP lost popularity (26.6% in 2007), the SVP retained about the same popularity (18.2% in 2007) and the FDP moved from below fourth place in 2007 to fourth. A total of 202 votes were cast in this election, of which 2 or 1.0% were invalid.

== Economy ==
As of 2010, Léchelles had an unemployment rate of 2.3%. As of 2008, there were 41 people employed in the primary economic sector and about 18 businesses involved in this sector. 12 people were employed in the secondary sector and there were 5 businesses in this sector. 48 people were employed in the tertiary sector, with 9 businesses in this sector. There were 250 residents of the municipality who were employed in some capacity, of which females made up 44.0% of the workforce.

In 2008 the total number of full-time equivalent jobs was 80. The number of jobs in the primary sector was 28, all of which were in agriculture. The number of jobs in the secondary sector was 10 of which 5 were in manufacturing and 5 were in construction. The number of jobs in the tertiary sector was 42. In the tertiary sector; 28 or 66.7% were in wholesale or retail sales or the repair of motor vehicles, 5 or 11.9% were in a hotel or restaurant, 1 was a technical professional or scientist, 5 or 11.9% were in education.

In 2000, there were 23 workers who commuted into the municipality and 195 workers who commuted away. The municipality is a net exporter of workers, with about 8.5 workers leaving the municipality for every one entering. Of the working population, 16.4% used public transportation to get to work, and 66% used a private car.

== Religion ==
From the 2000 census, 380 or 75.5% were Roman Catholic, while 54 or 10.7% belonged to the Swiss Reformed Church. Of the rest of the population, there were 2 members of an Orthodox church (or about 0.40% of the population), and there were 26 individuals (or about 5.17% of the population) who belonged to another Christian church. There was 1 individual who was Jewish, and 2 (or about 0.40% of the population) who were Islamic. 31 (or about 6.16% of the population) belonged to no church, are agnostic or atheist, and 20 individuals (or about 3.98% of the population) did not answer the question.

== Education ==
In Léchelles about 164 or (32.6%) of the population have completed non-mandatory upper secondary education, and 50 or (9.9%) have completed additional higher education (either university or a Fachhochschule). Of the 50 who completed tertiary schooling, 66.0% were Swiss men, 28.0% were Swiss women.

The Canton of Fribourg school system provides one year of non-obligatory Kindergarten, followed by six years of Primary school. This is followed by three years of obligatory lower Secondary school where the students are separated according to ability and aptitude. Following the lower Secondary students may attend a three or four year optional upper Secondary school. The upper Secondary school is divided into gymnasium (university preparatory) and vocational programs. After they finish the upper Secondary program, students may choose to attend a Tertiary school or continue their apprenticeship.

During the 2010–11 school year, there were a total of 59 students attending 3 classes in Léchelles. A total of 103 students from the municipality attended any school, either in the municipality or outside of it. There was one kindergarten class with a total of 19 students in the municipality. The municipality had 2 primary classes and 40 students. During the same year, there were no lower secondary classes in the municipality, but 24 students attended lower secondary school in a neighboring municipality. There were no upper Secondary classes or vocational classes, but there was one upper Secondary student and 26 upper Secondary vocational students who attended classes in another municipality. The municipality had no non-university Tertiary classes, but there was one non-university Tertiary student and 5 specialized Tertiary students who attended classes in another municipality.

As of 2000, there were 28 students in Léchelles who came from another municipality, while 58 residents attended schools outside the municipality.
