= Oleyres =

- Former municipality
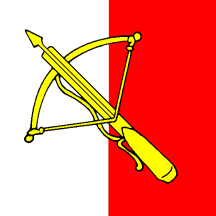
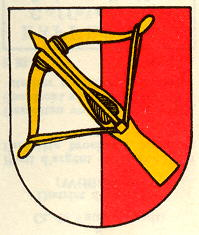
- Flag Coat of arms
- Location of Oleyres
- Location within Switzerland Location within Canton of Vaud
- Coordinates: 46°51.22′N 7°2.25′E
- Country: Switzerland
- Canton: Vaud
- District: Broye-Vully

Area
  - Total: 1.92 km^{2} (0.74 sq mi)
- Elevation: 551 m (1,808 ft)

Population (2000)
  - Total: 235
  - Density: 122/km^{2} (317/sq mi)
- Demonym: Les renards
- Time zone: UTC+01:00 (CET)
  - Summer (DST): UTC+02:00 (CEST)
- Postal code: 1580
- SFOS number: 5461
- ISO 3166 code: CH-VD
- Localities: Oleyres
- Surrounded by: Avenches, Domdidier (FR), Léchelles (FR), Misery-Courtion (FR)
- Website: www.oleyres.ch

Oleyres is a former municipality in the Swiss canton of Vaud in the district of Broye-Vully.

On 1 July 2011 it was merged into the municipality of Avenches.

== History ==
Oleyres is first mentioned around 1101-50 as de Holeriis. Between 1151 and 1200 it was mentioned as de Oleres.

== Geography ==
Oleyres has an area, as of 2009, of 1.92 square kilometers (0.74 sq mi). Of this area, 1.34 km^{2} (0.52 sq mi) or 69.8% is used for agricultural purposes, while 0.42 km^{2} (0.16 sq mi) or 21.9% is forested. Of the rest of the land, 0.14 km^{2} (35 acres) or 7.3% is settled (buildings or roads).

Of the built up area, housing and buildings made up 4.7% and transportation infrastructure made up 2.1%. Out of the forested land, 19.8% of the total land area is heavily forested and 2.1% is covered with orchards or small clusters of trees. Of the agricultural land, 44.8% is used for growing crops and 23.4% is pastures, while 1.6% is used for orchards or vine crops.

The municipality was part of the Avenches District until it was dissolved on 31 August 2006, and Oleyres became part of the new district of Broye-Vully.

The municipality is located on a hill that rises above the Broye valley south-east of Avenches. It consists of the linear village of Oleyres.

== Coat of arms ==
The blazon of the municipal coat of arms is Per pale Argent and Gules, overall a Crossbow bendwise Or.

== Demographics ==
Oleyres has a population (as of 2000) of 235. As of 2008, 9.1% of the population are resident foreign nationals. Over the last 10 years (1999–2009 ) the population has changed at a rate of -5.6%. It has changed at a rate of -6.9% due to migration and at a rate of 0.9% due to births and deaths.

Most of the population (as of 2000) speaks French (176 or 78.9%), with German being second most common (34 or 15.2%) and English being third (6 or 2.7%).

Of the population in the municipality 104 or about 46.6% were born in Oleyres and lived there in 2000. There were 34 or 15.2% who were born in the same canton, while 56 or 25.1% were born somewhere else in Switzerland, and 26 or 11.7% were born outside of Switzerland.

In 2008 there was 1 live birth to Swiss citizens and were 6 deaths of Swiss citizens. Ignoring immigration and emigration, the population of Swiss citizens decreased by 5 while the foreign population remained the same. There was 1 Swiss man who emigrated from Switzerland. The total Swiss population change in 2008 (from all sources, including moves across municipal borders) was a decrease of 2 and the non-Swiss population increased by 1 person. This represents a population growth rate of -0.5%.

The age distribution, as of 2009, in Oleyres is; 13 children or 6.0% of the population are between 0 and 9 years old and 38 teenagers or 17.4% are between 10 and 19. Of the adult population, 30 people or 13.8% of the population are between 20 and 29 years old. 18 people or 8.3% are between 30 and 39, 36 people or 16.5% are between 40 and 49, and 37 people or 17.0% are between 50 and 59. The senior population distribution is 22 people or 10.1% of the population are between 60 and 69 years old, 14 people or 6.4% are between 70 and 79, there are 10 people or 4.6% who are between 80 and 89.

As of 2000, there were 105 people who were single and never married in the municipality. There were 103 married individuals, 10 widows or widowers and 5 individuals who are divorced.

As of 2000 the average number of residents per living room was 0.57 which is about equal to the cantonal average of 0.61 per room. In this case, a room is defined as space of a housing unit of at least 4 m^{2} (43 sq ft) as normal bedrooms, dining rooms, living rooms, kitchens and habitable cellars and attics. About 71.4% of the total households were owner occupied, or in other words did not pay rent (though they may have a mortgage or a rent-to-own agreement).

As of 2000, there were 78 private households in the municipality, and an average of 2.8 persons per household. There were 17 households that consist of only one person and 13 households with five or more people. Out of a total of 79 households that answered this question, 21.5% were households made up of just one person and there were 2 adults who lived with their parents. Of the rest of the households, there are 18 married couples without children, 33 married couples with children There were 7 single parents with a child or children. There was 1 household that was made up of unrelated people and 1 household that was made up of some sort of institution or another collective housing.

In 2000 there were 50 single family homes (or 65.8% of the total) out of a total of 76 inhabited buildings. There were 6 multi-family buildings (7.9%), along with 16 multi-purpose buildings that were mostly used for housing (21.1%) and 4 other use buildings (commercial or industrial) that also had some housing (5.3%). Of the single family homes 22 were built before 1919, while 6 were built between 1990 and 2000. The greatest number of multi-family homes (2) were built before 1919 and again between 1971 and 1980.

In 2000 there were 88 apartments in the municipality. The most common apartment size was 4 rooms of which there were 25. There were 1 single room apartments and 43 apartments with five or more rooms. Of these apartments, a total of 77 apartments (87.5% of the total) were permanently occupied, while 8 apartments (9.1%) were seasonally occupied and 3 apartments (3.4%) were empty. As of 2009, the construction rate of new housing units was 0 new units per 1000 residents. The vacancy rate for the municipality, in 2010, was 7.37%.

The historical population is given in the following chart:

== Politics ==
In the 2007 federal election the most popular party was the SVP which received 37.49% of the vote. The next three most popular parties were the SP (19.87%), the FDP (18.75%) and the Green Party (8.07%). In the federal election, a total of 75 votes were cast, and the voter turnout was 46.0%.

== Economy ==
As of 2010, Oleyres had an unemployment rate of 1.1%. As of 2008, there were 29 people employed in the primary economic sector and about 11 businesses involved in this sector. 31 people were employed in the secondary sector and there were 4 businesses in this sector. 8 people were employed in the tertiary sector, with 4 businesses in this sector. There were 100 residents of the municipality who were employed in some capacity, of which females made up 36.0% of the workforce.

In 2008 the total number of full-time equivalent jobs was 52. The number of jobs in the primary sector was 18, all of which were in agriculture. The number of jobs in the secondary sector was 28, all of which were in manufacturing. The number of jobs in the tertiary sector was 6. In the tertiary sector; 1 was in a hotel or restaurant, 1 was a technical professional or scientist, 3 or 50.0% were in education.

In 2000, there were 24 workers who commuted into the municipality and 64 workers who commuted away. The municipality is a net exporter of workers, with about 2.7 workers leaving the municipality for every one entering. Of the working population, 2% used public transportation to get to work, and 65% used a private car.

== Religion ==
From the 2000 census, 42 or 18.8% were Roman Catholic, while 128 or 57.4% belonged to the Swiss Reformed Church. Of the rest of the population, and there were 23 individuals (or about 10.31% of the population) who belonged to another Christian church. There was 1 person who was Hindu. 29 (or about 13.00% of the population) belonged to no church, are agnostic or atheist.

== Education ==
In Oleyres about 66 or (29.6%) of the population have completed non-mandatory upper secondary education, and 27 or (12.1%) have completed additional higher education (either university or a Fachhochschule). Of the 27 who completed tertiary schooling, 55.6% were Swiss men, 25.9% were Swiss women.

In the 2009/2010 school year there were a total of 24 students in the Oleyres school district. In the Vaud cantonal school system, two years of non-obligatory pre-school are provided by the political districts. During the school year, the political district provided pre-school care for a total of 155 children of which 83 children (53.5%) received subsidized pre-school care. The canton's primary school program requires students to attend for four years. There were 8 students in the municipal primary school program. The obligatory lower secondary school program lasts for six years and there were 16 students in those schools.

As of 2000, there were 11 students in Oleyres who came from another municipality, while 53 residents attended schools outside the municipality.
