= Avenches Castle =

Castle in Avenches, Switzerland

- Château d'Avenches
- Avenches
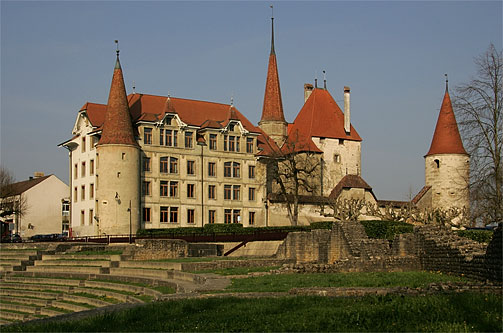
- Avenches Castle

Site information
- Owner: Avenches municipality

Location
- Coordinates: 46°52′53″N 7°02′28″E

Site history
- Built: 1175

Garrison information
- Occupants: Évêque de Lausanne

Swiss Cultural Property of National Significance

Panorama near to the Chateau d'Avenches

Avenches Castle is a castle in the municipality of Avenches of the Canton of Vaud in Switzerland. It is a Swiss heritage site of national significance.

== See also ==
- List of castles in Switzerland
- Château
