= Belmont-Broye =

- Municipality
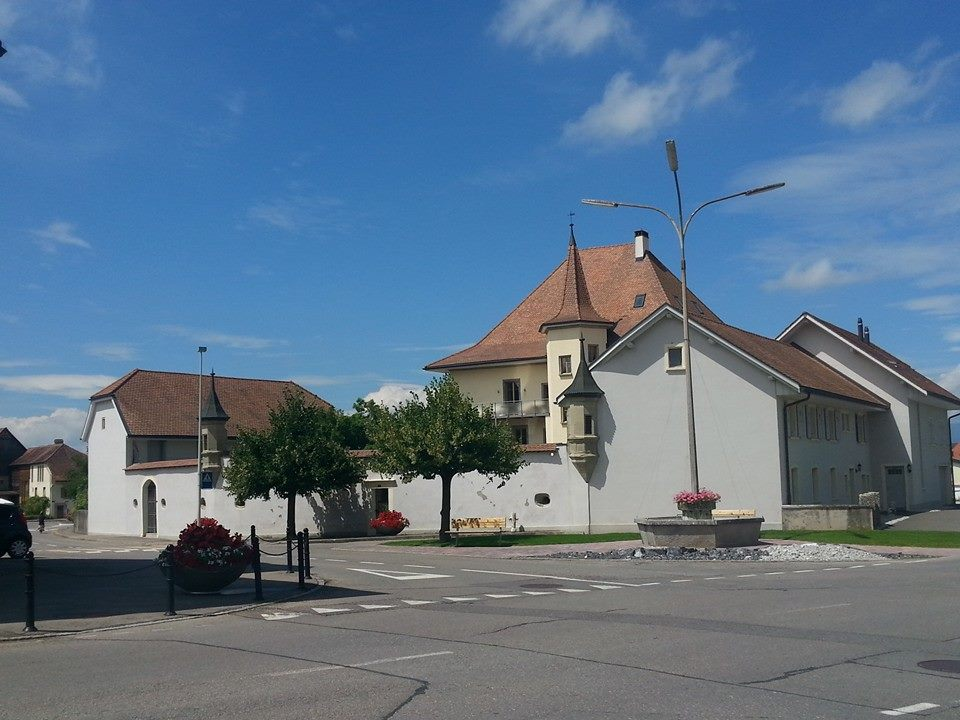
- The Castle of Domdidier, part of Belmont-Broye

- Flag Coat of arms
- Location of Belmont-Broye
- Location within Switzerland Location within Canton of Fribourg
- Coordinates: 46°52′N 7°1′E
- Country: Switzerland
- Canton: Fribourg
- District: Broye

Area
  - Total: 25.81 km^{2} (9.97 sq mi)

Population (Dec 2014)
  - Total: 4,914
  - Density: 190.4/km^{2} (493.1/sq mi)
- Time zone: UTC+01:00 (CET)
  - Summer (DST): UTC+02:00 (CEST)
- Postal codes: 1563-4; 1773
- SFOS number: 2053
- ISO 3166 code: CH-FR
- Surrounded by: Avenches (VD), Grolley-Ponthaux, Missy (VD), Montagny, Saint-Aubin
- Website: https://www.belmont-broye.ch SFSO statistics

Belmont-Broye (French pronunciation: [bɛlmɔ̃ bʁwa]; Arpitan: Bélmont-Brouye) is a municipality in the district of Broye, in the canton of Fribourg, Switzerland. On 1 January 2016, the former municipalities of Domdidier, Dompierre, Léchelles and Russy merged to form Belmont-Broye.

== History ==
Domdidier is first mentioned around 1157-62 as Donno Desiderio.

Dompierre is first mentioned in 1137 as Donperre.

Léchelles is first mentioned in 1243 as Leschieres. The municipality was formerly known by its German name Leitern, however, that name is no longer used.

Russy is first mentioned in 1228 as Rusie.

== Geography ==
Belmont-Broye has an area of 25.79 km^{2} (9.96 sq mi).

== Demographics ==
Belmont-Broye has a population (as of December 2020) of 5,635.

== Heritage sites of national significance ==
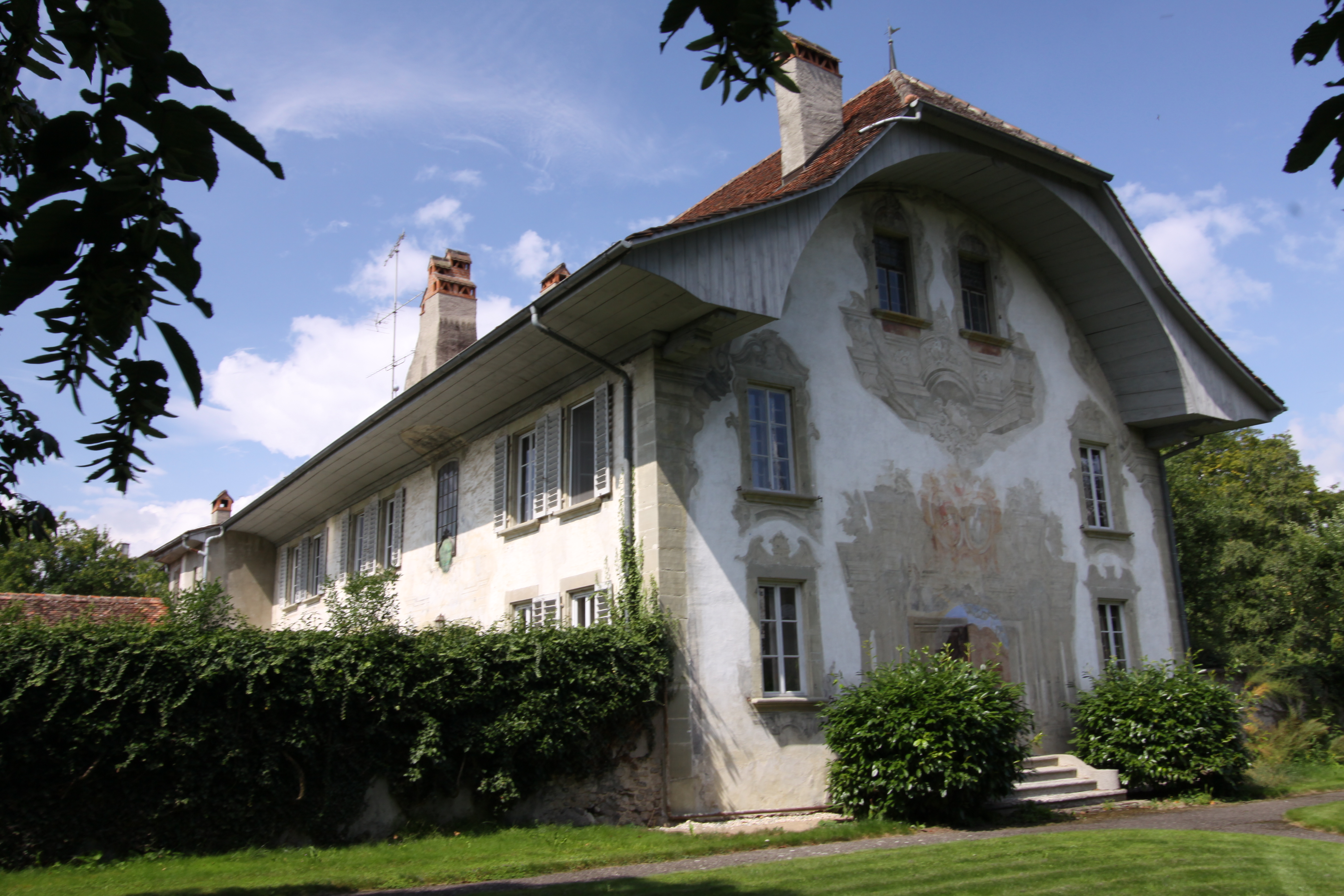
Mansion De Gottrau

The Mansion De Gottrau is listed as a Swiss heritage site of national significance. The entire village of Dompierre is designated as part of the Inventory of Swiss Heritage Sites.

== Transportation ==
The municipality has three railway stations: Domdidier and Dompierre FR to the northwest on the Palézieux–Lyss line and Léchelles to the south on the Fribourg–Yverdon line. Between them they have regular service to Lausanne, Kerzers, Fribourg/Freiburg, and Yverdon-les-Bains.
