= Domdidier =

- Former municipality
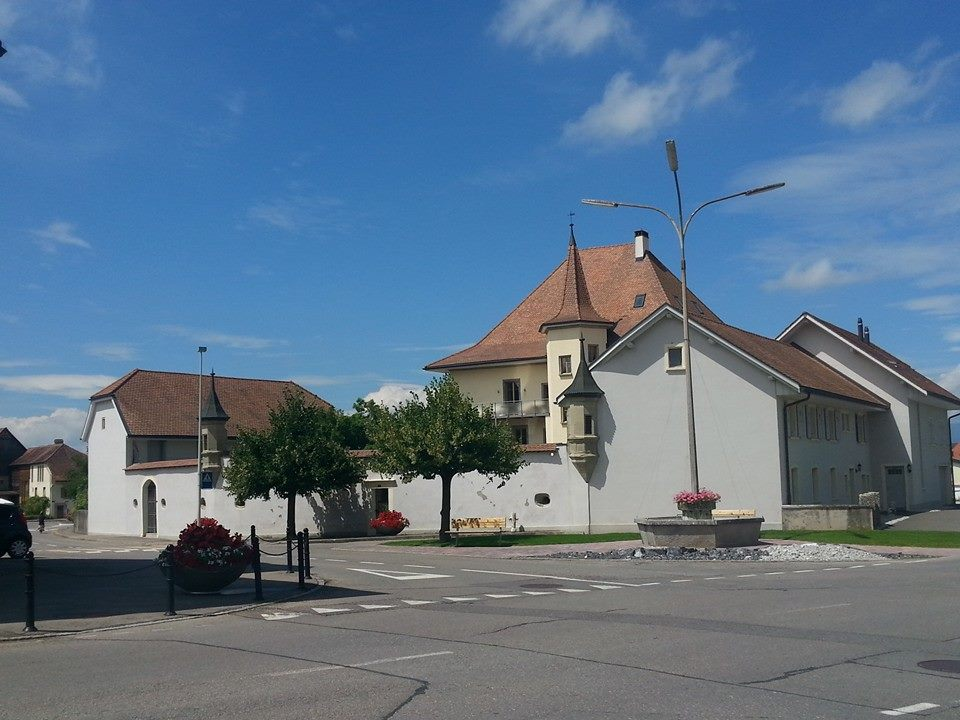
- The Castle of Domdidier

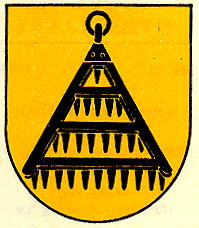
- Coat of arms
- Location of Domdidier
- Location within Switzerland Location within Canton of Fribourg
- Coordinates: 46°52′N 7°1′E
- Country: Switzerland
- Canton: Fribourg
- District: Broye

Government
  - Mayor: Syndic

Area
  - Total: 8.9 km^{2} (3.4 sq mi)
- Elevation: 443 m (1,453 ft)

Population (Dec 2014)
  - Total: 2,948
  - Density: 330/km^{2} (860/sq mi)
- Time zone: UTC+01:00 (CET)
  - Summer (DST): UTC+02:00 (CEST)
- Postal code: 1564
- SFOS number: 2013
- ISO 3166 code: CH-FR
- Surrounded by: Avenches (VD), Dompierre, Léchelles, Missy (VD), Oleyres (VD), Russy, Saint-Aubin
- Website: SFSO statistics

Domdidier (French: [dɔ̃didje]; Arpitan: Domdediér, locally Dondedi [dɔ̃dəˈdi]) is a former municipality in the district of Broye, in the canton of Fribourg, Switzerland. On 1 January 2016, the former municipalities of Domdidier, Dompierre, Léchelles and Russy merged to form Belmont-Broye.

== History ==
Aerial view (1964)

Domdidier is first mentioned around 1157-62 as Donno Desiderio.

== Geography ==
Domdidier had an area, as of 2009, of 8.9 square kilometers (3.4 mi^{2}). Of this area, 6.07 km^{2} (2.34 mi^{2}) or 68.1% is used for agricultural purposes, while 1.35 km^{2} (0.52 mi^{2}) or 15.2% is forested. Of the rest of the land, 1.41 km^{2} (0.54 mi^{2}) or 15.8% is settled (buildings or roads), 0.08 km^{2} (20 acres) or 0.9% is either rivers or lakes and 0.02 km^{2} (4.9 acres) or 0.2% is unproductive land.

Of the built up area, industrial buildings made up 2.0% of the total area while housing and buildings made up 8.2% and transportation infrastructure made up 5.1%. Out of the forested land, 13.2% of the total land area is heavily forested and 1.9% is covered with orchards or small clusters of trees. Of the agricultural land, 52.4% is used for growing crops and 14.1% is pastures, while 1.6% is used for orchards or vine crops. All the water in the municipality is flowing water.

The former municipality is in the Broye district, on the Payerne-Murten road. It consists of the village of Domdidier and the hamlets of Granges-Rothey and Eissy.

== Coat of arms ==
The blazon of the municipal coat of arms is Or, a Harrow Sable.

== Demographics ==
Domdidier had a population (as of 2014) of 2,948. As of 2008, 17.3% of the population are resident foreign nationals. Over the last 10 years (2000–2010) the population has changed at a rate of 18.5%. Migration accounted for 13.5%, while births and deaths accounted for 7.1%.

Most of the population (as of 2000) speaks French (1,894 or 86.2%) as their first language, German is the second most common (127 or 5.8%) and Portuguese is the third (69 or 3.1%). There are 10 people who speak Italian and 1 person who speaks Romansh.

As of 2008, the population was 50.5% male and 49.5% female. The population was made up of 1,026 Swiss men (40.4% of the population) and 254 (10.0%) non-Swiss men. There were 1,032 Swiss women (40.7%) and 225 (8.9%) non-Swiss women. Of the population in the municipality, 878 or about 40.0% were born in Domdidier and lived there in 2000. There were 470 or 21.4% who were born in the same canton, while 463 or 21.1% were born somewhere else in Switzerland, and 334 or 15.2% were born outside of Switzerland.

The age distribution, as of 2000, in Domdidier is; 296 children or 13.5% of the population are between 0 and 9 years old and 303 teenagers or 13.8% are between 10 and 19. Of the adult population, 294 people or 13.4% of the population are between 20 and 29 years old. 380 people or 17.3% are between 30 and 39, 298 people or 13.6% are between 40 and 49, and 271 people or 12.3% are between 50 and 59. The senior population distribution is 161 people or 7.3% of the population are between 60 and 69 years old, 119 people or 5.4% are between 70 and 79, there are 58 people or 2.6% who are between 80 and 89, and there are 16 people or 0.7% who are 90 and older.

As of 2000, there were 930 people who were single and never married in the municipality. There were 1,063 married individuals, 112 widows or widowers and 91 individuals who are divorced.

As of 2000, there were 819 private households in the municipality, and an average of 2.6 persons per household. There were 200 households that consist of only one person and 85 households with five or more people. In 2000, a total of 801 apartments (88.9% of the total) were permanently occupied, while 79 apartments (8.8%) were seasonally occupied and 21 apartments (2.3%) were empty. As of 2009, the construction rate of new housing units was 5.1 new units per 1000 residents. The vacancy rate for the municipality, in 2010, was 1.46%.

The historical population is given in the following chart:

== Politics ==
In the 2011 federal election the most popular party was the SP which received 27.2% of the vote. The next three most popular parties were the FDP (26.4%), the CVP (18.4%) and the SVP (14.9%).

The SPS received about the same percentage of the vote as they did in the 2007 Federal election (27.9% in 2007 vs 27.2% in 2011). The FDP moved from fourth in 2007 (with 18.1%) to second in 2011, the CVP moved from second in 2007 (with 22.4%) to third and the SVP moved from third in 2007 (with 19.0%) to fourth. A total of 855 votes were cast in this election, of which 11 or 1.3% were invalid.

== Economy ==
As of 2010, Domdidier had an unemployment rate of 2.8%. As of 2008, there were 51 people employed in the primary economic sector and about 22 businesses involved in this sector. 777 people were employed in the secondary sector and there were 38 businesses in this sector. 863 people were employed in the tertiary sector, with 98 businesses in this sector. There were 1,133 residents of the municipality who were employed in some capacity, of which females made up 42.7% of the workforce.

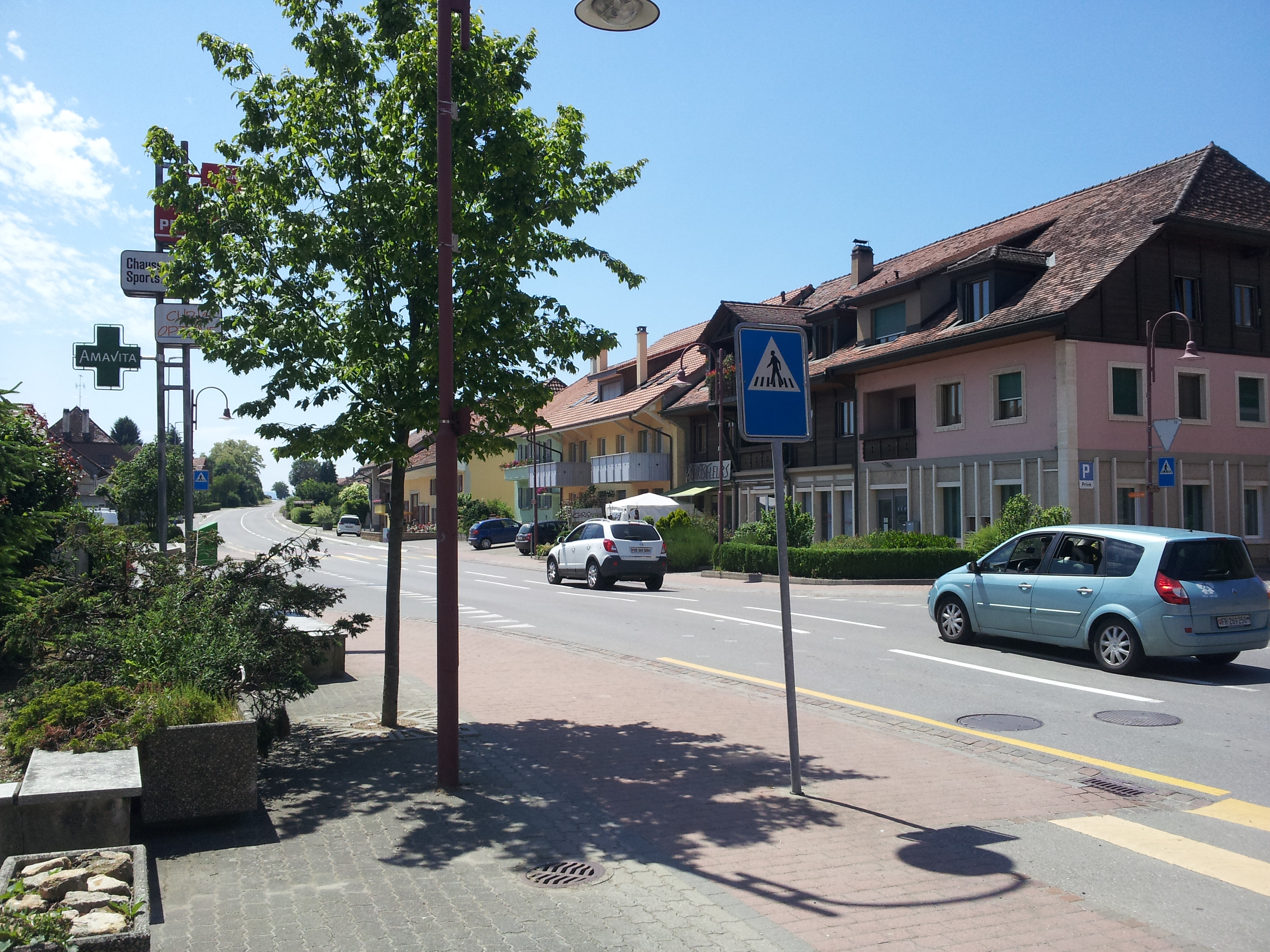
Central road

In 2008 the total number of full-time equivalent jobs was 1,508. The number of jobs in the primary sector was 36, all of which were in agriculture. The number of jobs in the secondary sector was 745 of which 593 or (79.6%) were in manufacturing and 150 (20.1%) were in construction. The number of jobs in the tertiary sector was 727. In the tertiary sector; 305 or 42.0% were in wholesale or retail sales or the repair of motor vehicles, 5 or 0.7% were in the movement and storage of goods, 21 or 2.9% were in a hotel or restaurant, 2 or 0.3% were in the information industry, 17 or 2.3% were the insurance or financial industry, 70 or 9.6% were technical professionals or scientists, 45 or 6.2% were in education and 56 or 7.7% were in health care.

In 2000, there were 804 workers who commuted into the municipality and 660 workers who commuted away. The municipality is a net importer of workers, with about 1.2 workers entering the municipality for every one leaving. Of the working population, 6.8% used public transportation to get to work, and 70.3% used a private car.

== Religion ==
From the 2000 census, 1,573 or 71.6% were Roman Catholic, while 296 or 13.5% belonged to the Swiss Reformed Church. Of the rest of the population, there were 16 members of an Orthodox church (or about 0.73% of the population), there were 3 individuals (or about 0.14% of the population) who belonged to the Christian Catholic Church, and there were 45 individuals (or about 2.05% of the population) who belonged to another Christian church. There were 108 (or about 4.92% of the population) who were Islamic. There were 6 individuals who were Buddhist and 3 individuals who belonged to another church. 113 (or about 5.15% of the population) belonged to no church, are agnostic or atheist, and 55 individuals (or about 2.50% of the population) did not answer the question.

== Education ==
In Domdidier about 744 or (33.9%) of the population have completed non-mandatory upper secondary education, and 171 or (7.8%) have completed additional higher education (either university or a Fachhochschule). Of the 171 who completed tertiary schooling, 65.5% were Swiss men, 25.1% were Swiss women, 4.7% were non-Swiss men and 4.7% were non-Swiss women.

The Canton of Fribourg school system provides one year of non-obligatory Kindergarten, followed by six years of Primary school. This is followed by three years of obligatory lower Secondary school where the students are separated according to ability and aptitude. Following the lower Secondary students may attend a three or four year optional upper Secondary school. The upper Secondary school is divided into gymnasium (university preparatory) and vocational programs. After they finish the upper Secondary program, students may choose to attend a Tertiary school or continue their apprenticeship.

During the 2010–11 school year, there were a total of 715 students attending 34 classes in Domdidier. A total of 499 students from the municipality attended any school, either in the municipality or outside of it. There were 4 kindergarten classes with a total of 87 students in the municipality. The municipality had 11 primary classes and 221 students. During the same year, there were 19 lower secondary classes with a total of 407 students. There were no upper Secondary classes or vocational classes, but there were 4 upper Secondary students and 60 upper Secondary vocational students who attended classes in another municipality. The municipality had no non-university Tertiary classes, but there were 8 non-university Tertiary students and 3 specialized Tertiary students who attended classes in another municipality.

As of 2000, there were 154 students in Domdidier who came from another municipality, while 67 residents attended schools outside the municipality.
