= Russy, Switzerland =

Russy
- Former municipality
- Coat of arms
- Location of Russy
- Location within Switzerland Location within Canton of Fribourg
- Coordinates: 46°51′N 7°0′E
- Country: Switzerland
- Canton: Fribourg
- District: Broye

Government
  - Mayor: Syndic

Area
  - Total: 3.72 km^{2} (1.44 sq mi)
- Elevation: 550 m (1,800 ft)

Population (Dec 2014)
  - Total: 221
  - Density: 59.4/km^{2} (154/sq mi)
- Time zone: UTC+01:00 (CET)
  - Summer (DST): UTC+02:00 (CEST)
- Postal code: 1773
- SFOS number: 2040
- ISO 3166 code: CH-FR
- Surrounded by: Corcelles-près-Payerne (VD), Domdidier, Dompierre, Léchelles, Montagny
- Website: belmont-broye.ch

Russy (French pronunciation: [ʁysi]; Arpitan: Russi or Russél, pronounced [ʁyˈʃi]) is a former municipality in the district of Broye in the canton of Fribourg in Switzerland. On 1 January 2016, the former municipalities of Domdidier, Dompierre, Léchelles and Russy merged to form Belmont-Broye.

== History ==
Russy is first mentioned in 1228 as Rusie.

== Geography ==
Russy had an area, as of 2009, of 3.7 square kilometers (1.4 mi^{2}). Of this area, 2.25 km^{2} (0.87 mi^{2}) or 60.8% is used for agricultural purposes, while 1.31 km^{2} (0.51 mi^{2}) or 35.4% is forested. Of the rest of the land, 0.15 km^{2} (37 acres) or 4.1% is settled (buildings or roads).

Of the built up area, housing and buildings made up 2.4% and transportation infrastructure made up 1.4%. Out of the forested land, 32.7% of the total land area is heavily forested and 2.7% is covered with orchards or small clusters of trees. Of the agricultural land, 40.8% is used for growing crops and 15.4% is pastures, while 4.6% is used for orchards or vine crops.

The former municipality is located in the Broye district.

== Coat of arms ==
The blazon of the municipal coat of arms is Per fess, Argent two Keys Gules in saltire and Gules issuant from Coupeaux Vert five ears Or.

== Demographics ==
Russy had a population (as of 2014) of 221. As of 2008, 3.3% of the population are resident foreign nationals. Over the last 10 years (2000–2010) the population has changed at a rate of -0.9%. Migration accounted for 2.4%, while births and deaths accounted for -0.5%. Most of the population (as of 2000) speaks French (191 or 97.9%) as their first language, German is the second most common (3 or 1.5%) and Polnisch is the third (1 or 0.5%).

As of 2008, the population was 47.8% male and 52.2% female. The population was made up of 95 Swiss men (46.3% of the population) and 3 (1.5%) non-Swiss men. There were 101 Swiss women (49.3%) and 6 (2.9%) non-Swiss women. Of the population in the municipality, 90 or about 46.2% were born in Russy and lived there in 2000. There were 63 or 32.3% who were born in the same canton, while 34 or 17.4% were born somewhere else in Switzerland, and 4 or 2.1% were born outside of Switzerland.

The age distribution, as of 2000, in Russy is; 19 children or 9.7% of the population are between 0 and 9 years old and 33 teenagers or 16.9% are between 10 and 19. Of the adult population, 26 people or 13.3% of the population are between 20 and 29 years old. 26 people or 13.3% are between 30 and 39, 33 people or 16.9% are between 40 and 49, and 16 people or 8.2% are between 50 and 59. The senior population distribution is 13 people or 6.7% of the population are between 60 and 69 years old, 13 people or 6.7% are between 70 and 79, there are 16 people or 8.2% who are between 80 and 89.

As of 2000, there were 88 people who were single and never married in the municipality. There were 87 married individuals, 13 widows or widowers and 7 individuals who are divorced.

As of 2000, there were 74 private households in the municipality, and an average of 2.6 persons per household. There were 18 households that consist of only one person and 7 households with five or more people. In 2000, a total of 73 apartments (93.6% of the total) were permanently occupied, while 1 apartment was seasonally occupied and 4 apartments (5.1%) were empty.

The historical population is given in the following chart:

== Politics ==
In the 2011 federal election the most popular party was the SVP which received 29.7% of the vote. The next three most popular parties were the CVP (23.1%), the SP (18.4%) and the FDP (9.3%).

The SVP received about the same percentage of the vote as they did in the 2007 Federal election (33.6% in 2007 vs 29.7% in 2011). The CVP retained about the same popularity (27.5% in 2007), the SPS retained about the same popularity (16.2% in 2007) and the FDP retained about the same popularity (9.6% in 2007). A total of 83 votes were cast in this election.

== Economy ==
As of 2010, Russy had an unemployment rate of 0.8%. As of 2008, there were 24 people employed in the primary economic sector and about 10 businesses involved in this sector. No one was employed in the secondary sector. 1 person was employed in the tertiary sector, with 1 business in this sector. There were 88 residents of the municipality who were employed in some capacity, of which females made up 40.9% of the workforce.

In 2008 the total number of full-time equivalent jobs was 18. The number of jobs in the primary sector was 17, all of which were in agriculture. There were no jobs in the secondary sector. There was one job in the tertiary sector, in education.

In 2000, there were 4 workers who commuted into the municipality and 66 workers who commuted away. The municipality is a net exporter of workers, with about 16.5 workers leaving the municipality for every one entering. Of the working population, 6.8% used public transportation to get to work, and 68.2% used a private car.

== Religion ==
From the 2000 census, 150 or 76.9% were Roman Catholic, while 15 or 7.7% belonged to the Swiss Reformed Church. Of the rest of the population, there were 11 individuals (or about 5.64% of the population) who belonged to another Christian church. 14 (or about 7.18% of the population) belonged to no church, are agnostic or atheist, and 8 individuals (or about 4.10% of the population) did not answer the question.

== Education ==
In Russy about 48 or (24.6%) of the population have completed non-mandatory upper secondary education, and 19 or (9.7%) have completed additional higher education (either university or a Fachhochschule). Of the 19 who completed tertiary schooling, 57.9% were Swiss men, 36.8% were Swiss women.

The Canton of Fribourg school system provides one year of non-obligatory Kindergarten, followed by six years of Primary school. This is followed by three years of obligatory lower Secondary school where the students are separated according to ability and aptitude. Following the lower Secondary students may attend a three or four year optional upper Secondary school. The upper Secondary school is divided into gymnasium (university preparatory) and vocational programs. After they finish the upper Secondary program, students may choose to attend a Tertiary school or continue their apprenticeship.

During the 2010–11 school year, there were a total of 18 students attending one class in Russy. A total of 25 students from the municipality attended any school, either in the municipality or outside of it. There were no kindergarten classes in the municipality, but 1 student attended kindergarten in a neighboring municipality. The municipality had one primary class and 18 students. During the same year, there were no lower secondary classes in the municipality, but 9 students attended lower secondary school in a neighboring municipality. There were no upper Secondary classes or vocational classes, but there were 6 upper Secondary vocational students who attended classes in another municipality. The municipality had no non-university Tertiary classes. who attended classes in another municipality.

As of 2000, there were 12 students in Russy who came from another municipality, while 33 residents attended schools outside the municipality.
