= Avenches =

Place in Vaud, Switzerland

- Municipality
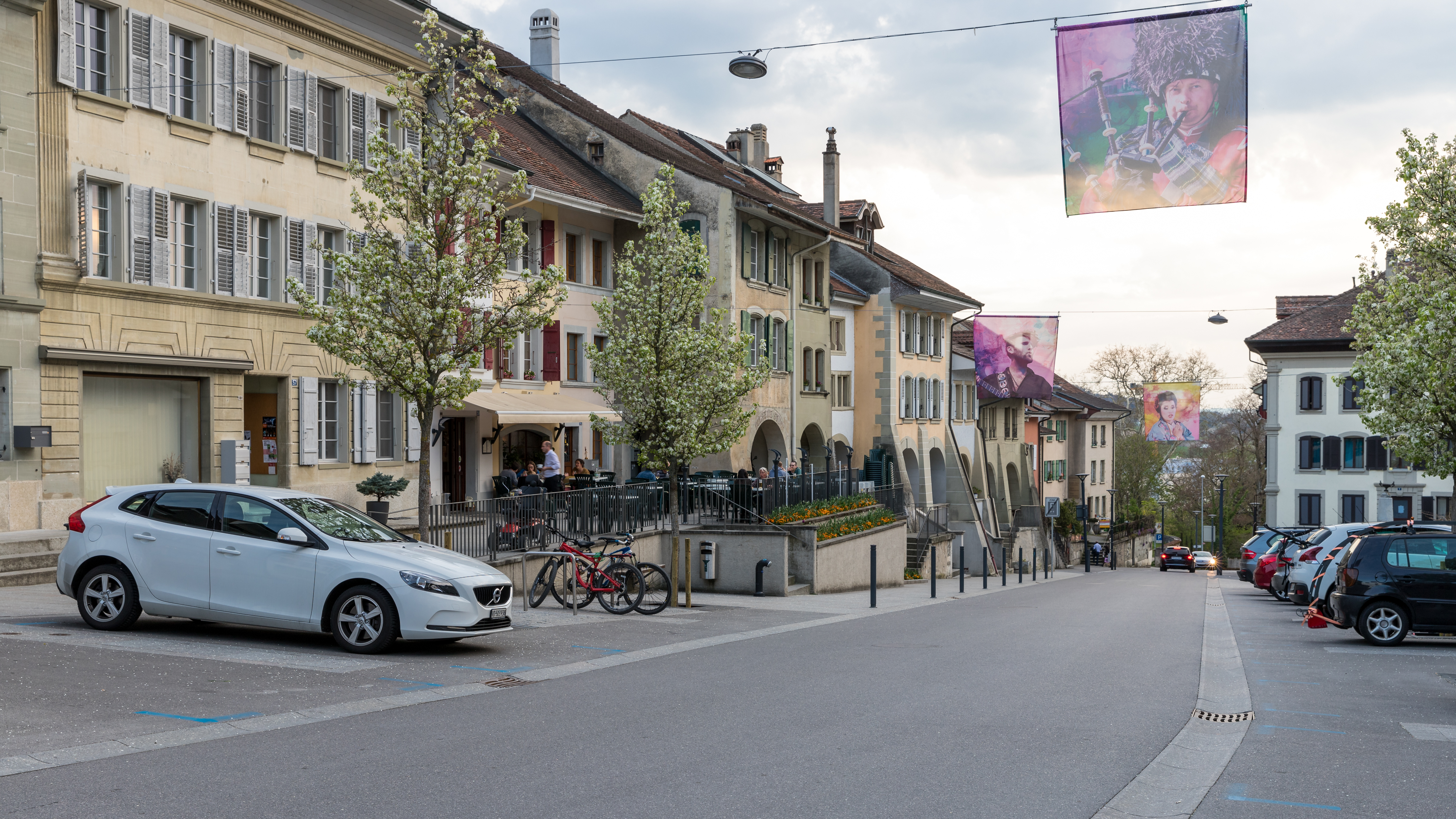
- Avenches, Rue Centrale

- Flag Coat of arms
- Location of Avenches
- Location within Switzerland Location within Canton of Vaud
- Coordinates: 46°53′N 7°02′E
- Country: Switzerland
- Canton: Vaud
- District: Broye-Vully

Government
  - Mayor: Syndic

Area
  - Total: 17.56 km^{2} (6.78 sq mi)
- Elevation: 480 m (1,570 ft)

Population (2004)
  - Total: 2,699
  - Density: 153.7/km^{2} (398.1/sq mi)
- Time zone: UTC+01:00 (CET)
  - Summer (DST): UTC+02:00 (CEST)
- Postal codes: 1580 Avenches; 1582 Donatyre
- SFOS number: 5451
- ISO 3166 code: CH-VD
- Localities: Donatyre
- Surrounded by: Faoug, Villarepos (FR), Misery-Courtion (FR), Oleyres, Belmont-Broye (FR), Saint-Aubin (FR), Villars-le-Grand, Montmagny, Constantine
- Website: commune-avenches.ch

Avenches (French pronunciation: [avɑ̃ʃ]) is a Swiss municipality in the canton of Vaud, located in the district of Broye-Vully.

== History ==
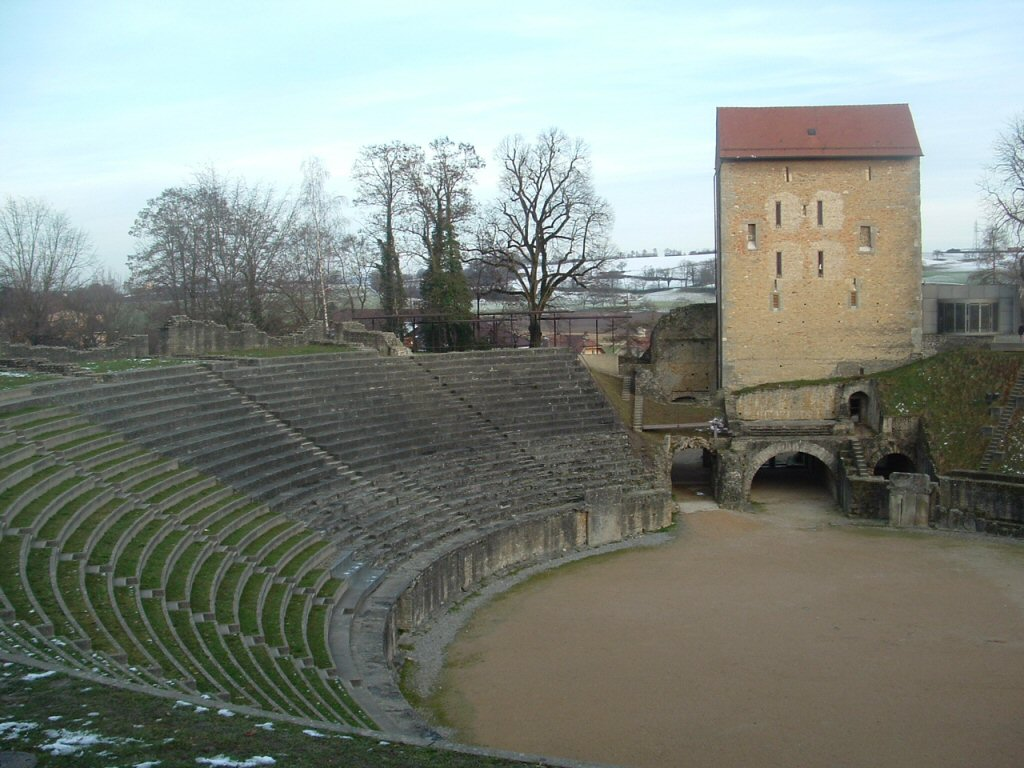
Roman amphitheater in Avenches.

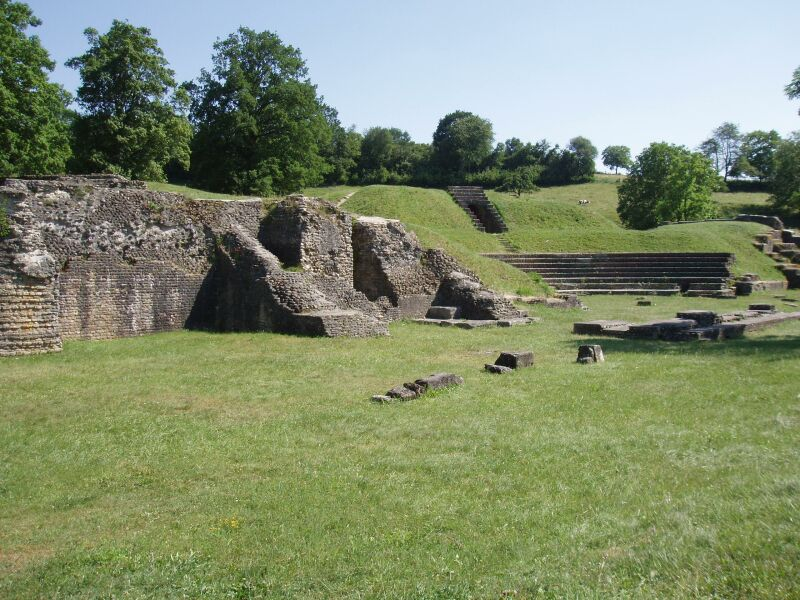
Roman theatre in Avenches.

The roots of Avenches go back to the Celts. A tribe of Helvetians had built a settlement on the hills of Bois de Châtel, south of the later Roman settlement. Nearby the Helvetii seem to have had their capital on Mont Vully as shown in recent archaeological excavation. The canal-La Broye-which joins Lac Morat to Lac Neuchâtel is thought to be Roman in origin.

The establishment of the Roman settlement of Aventicum, which became the capital of the province, took place around 15-13 B.C. The name comes from the Helvetian spring goddess Aventia. After patronage by the emperor Vespasian, Aventicum soon developed into a blooming commercial center with over 20,000 inhabitants. The town was granted colonia status-a retirement location for legionaries- although the built up area of the town occupied only a fraction of the walled area -the walls are some 5.6 kilometers in length. The walls were clearly a statement of status rather than being a practical defensive system. Excavations have revealed the detail of the theatre and major temple complex dedicated to the "genius" of Helvetia-Roman Switzerland. One column of the temple stands as the "cigognier"- formerly a nesting site for storks. Other parts of the city still visible are the amphitheatre which includes a later tower now housing the Professor Hans Bogli museum, the baths, the walls, two of the entrances gates, a smaller temple and part of a place building. Excavated but reburied is much of the Roman city. This part of Switzerland was invaded by the Alamanni tribe in the 280's who settled the German speaking parts of Switzerland giving the area its characteristic dialect of German. Rome never really held the area again and after the fall of Rome in the 5th century, a much smaller settlement was built on the former acropolis of the by now abandoned Roman town. The theatre had a short life as a separate defended area. Throughout this period, the town remained the seat of a bishopric and had at least two churches (Saint-Martin and Saint-Symphorian). When the bishop moved his seat to Lausanne in the sixth century, the decline of the former Roman city was complete.

In 1074, the Bishop of Lausanne, Burkhard von Oltigen founded a new city on the site and named it Adventica, which became Avenche in 1518. He built the tower on the edge of the Roman amphitheatre which now houses the museum. In the 11th century, it was surrounded by a wall, and it received city rights in 1259.

A German name for the town did not appear until the 13th century, and it is neither a translation of the Latin, nor a Germanized form of the French. In 1266 the form Wibilsburg appears, and then Wipelspurg (1302), Wibelspurg (1458), Wiblispurg (1476), Wiflispurg (1548), and Wiflisburg (1577). This is derived from the personal name Wibili.

Avenches is first mentioned in 1518 as Avenche.

The town made a treaty in 1239 with Fribourg and one in 1353 with Murten.

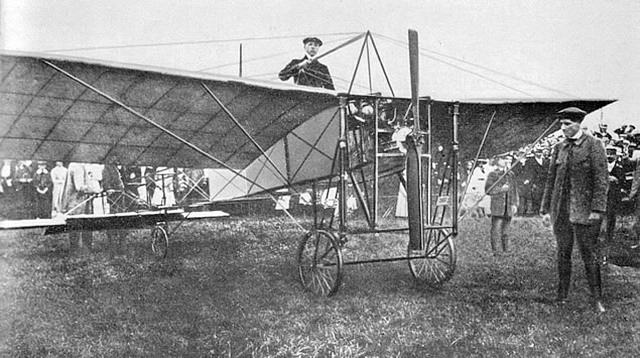
Ernest Failloubaz flight of 7 October 1910

With the Bernese conquest of Vaud in 1536, Avenches came under Bernese domination. In 1798, it became part of the Helvetic canton of Fribourg. In 1801, the population pushed for incorporation into the canton of Léman in the Helvetic Republic. With the mediation of Napoleon in 1803, Avenches became part of the canton of Vaud and capital of its district.

In 1826 a colony of Jews from Alsace settled in Avenches. They were primarily horse traders and built a synagogue in 1865. When economic circumstances worsened at the end of the 19th century the Jews left the city and the synagogue, which was no longer in use, was torn down in 1954.

An airfield was built on the flat land north of the municipality in 1910 where Ernest Failloubaz did the first flight in Switzerland of an aircraft built and flown by a Swiss citizen. During World War I, it served as a military airfield. When the military airport in Payerne was built in 1921, the field in Avenches was closed.

Excavation of the Roman town began in the 19th century but it was a well-known location in the Grand Tour and Joseph William Mallord Turner made a drawing of the "Cigognier", which shows the old town behind. Archaeology benefitted curiously from the first and second world wars when foreigners interned in Switzerland, and local unemployed, were engaged to excavate the main buildings of the Roman city and to renovate and open to the public the theatre, "Cigognier" and the gates and one tower of the wall. With the advent of the national highway scheme a programme of rescue archaeology was set up under the association "Pro Aventico" under the remarkably capable direction of Professor Hans Bogli, after whom the Roman museum has since been named. Work uncovered a remarkable palace building, much of the centre of the Roman town, and outside the walls a canal and roadway leading from the nearby lake and cemeteries and aqueducts outside the line of the Roman walls.

Near to the line of the Roman walls, and benefitting from use of stone from the walls is the small Romanesque church in Donatyre which possesses excellent early fresco paintings.

== Geography ==
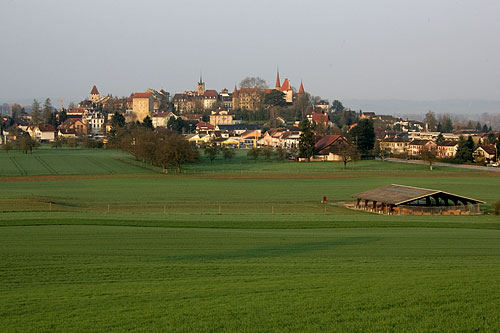
Avenches town and surrounding fields

Aerial view from 200 m by Walter Mittelholzer (1919)

Avenches has an area, as of 2009, of 17.56 square kilometers (6.78 sq mi). Of this area, 11.13 km^{2} (4.30 sq mi) or 63.4% is used for agricultural purposes, while 2.78 km^{2} (1.07 sq mi) or 15.8% is forested. Of the rest of the land, 3.44 km^{2} (1.33 sq mi) or 19.6% is settled (buildings or roads), 0.15 km^{2} (37 acres) or 0.9% is either rivers or lakes and 0.03 km^{2} (7.4 acres) or 0.2% is unproductive land.

Of the built up area, industrial buildings made up 1.8% of the total area while housing and buildings made up 4.1% and transportation infrastructure made up 6.0%. while parks, green belts and sports fields made up 6.8%. Out of the forested land, 13.4% of the total land area is heavily forested and 2.4% is covered with orchards or small clusters of trees. Of the agricultural land, 51.7% is used for growing crops and 10.6% is pastures. Of the water in the municipality, 0.3% is in lakes and 0.5% is in rivers and streams.

It was the capital of the Avenches District until 1 September 2006 when it became part of the new district of Broye-Vully.

Avenches is located on a hill, isolated in the Broye valley, 12 km (7.5 mi) north-west of Fribourg. The village Donatyre (505 m (1,657 ft)), south of Avenches, belongs to the municipality of Avenches, partly until 2006, and entirely since the municipality of Donatyre merged with Avenches.

The municipality of Oleyres merged on 1 January 2011 into the municipality of Avenches.

== Coat of arms ==
The blazon of the municipal coat of arms is Gules, Moors head proper with a band Argent around, clothed in Azure and Or.

== Demographics ==
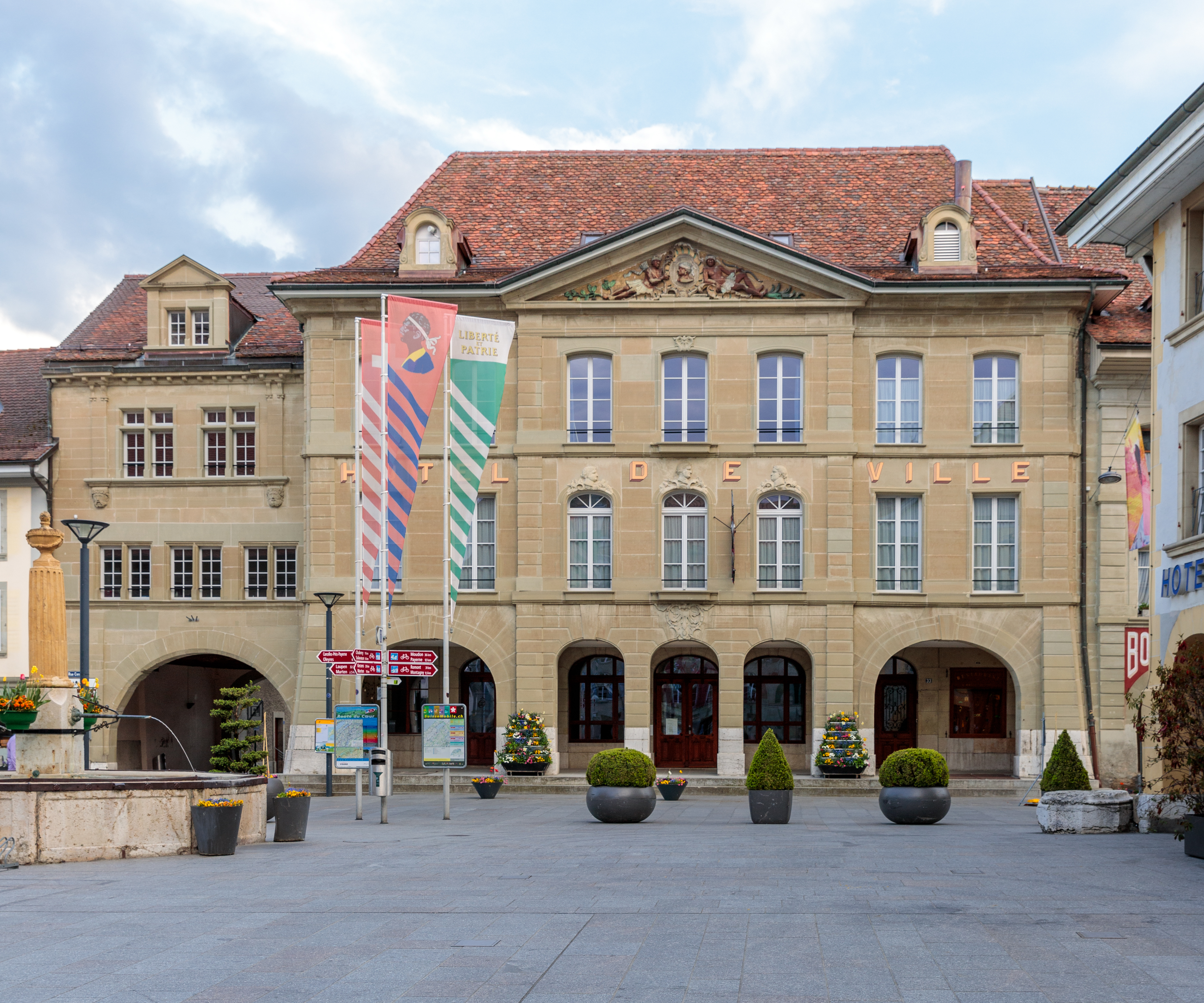
Town hall of Avenches

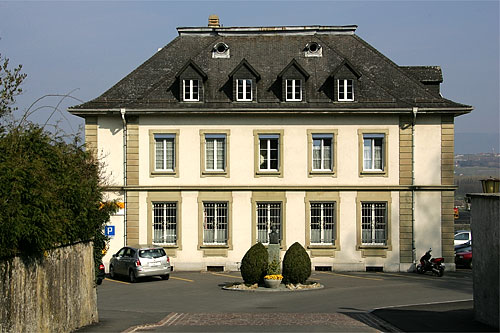
Post and Monument to Henri Guisan.

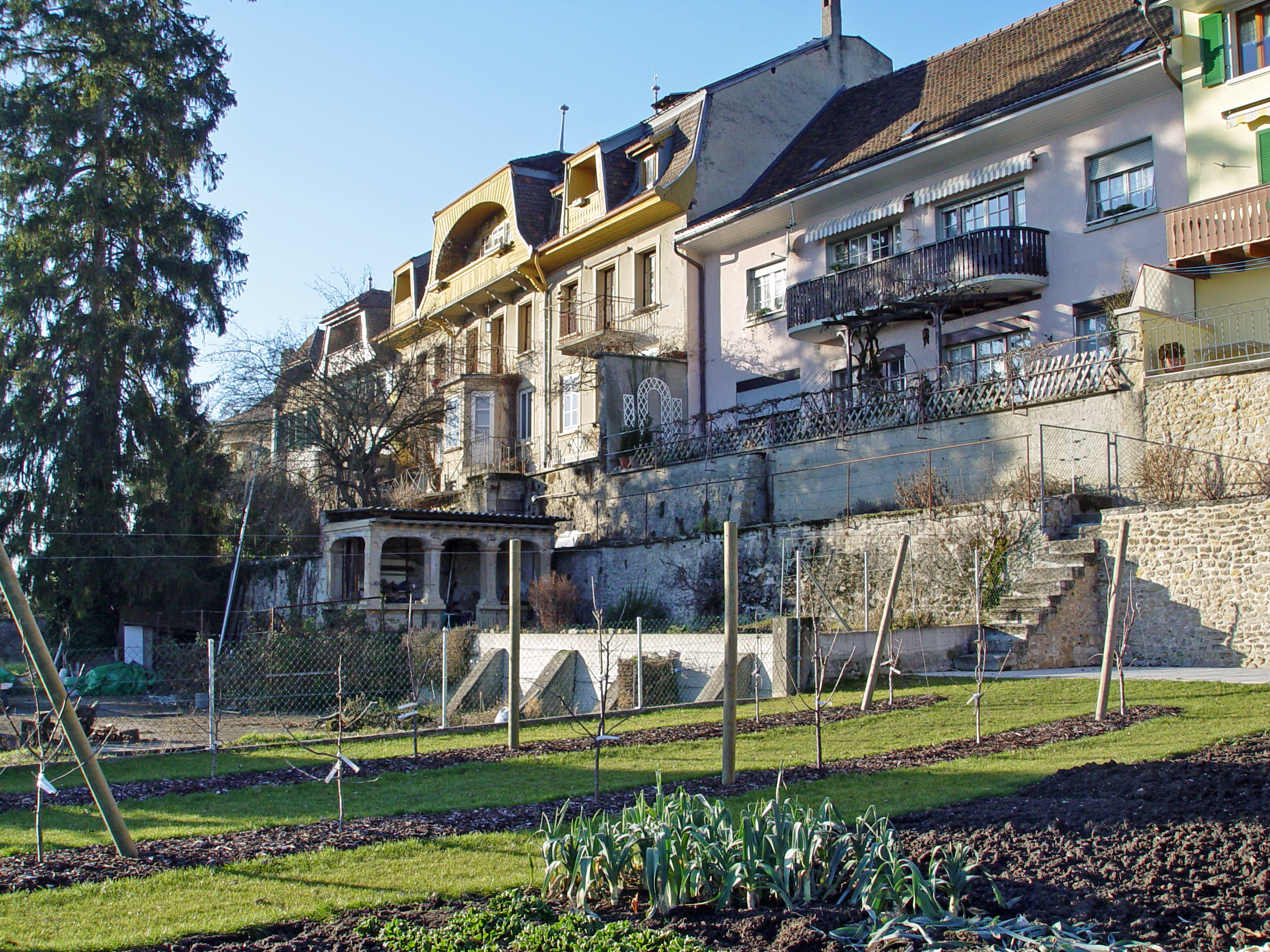
Houses along the old city wall

Avenches has a population (as of December 2020) of 4,477. As of 2008, 32.9% of the population are resident foreign nationals. Over the last 10 years (1999–2009) the population has changed at a rate of 16.2%. It has changed at a rate of 14% due to migration and at a rate of 3% due to births and deaths.

Most of the population (as of 2000) speaks French (1,866 or 73.3%), with German being second most common (329 or 12.9%) and Portuguese being third (152 or 6.0%). There are 78 people who speak Italian and 1 person who speaks Romansh.

Of the population in the municipality 693 or about 27.2% were born in Avenches and lived there in 2000. There were 357 or 14.0% who were born in the same canton, while 710 or 27.9% were born somewhere else in Switzerland, and 663 or 26.1% were born outside of Switzerland.

In 2008 there were 20 live births to Swiss citizens and 11 births to non-Swiss citizens, and in same time span there were 17 deaths of Swiss citizens and 2 non-Swiss citizen deaths. Ignoring immigration and emigration, the population of Swiss citizens increased by 3 while the foreign population increased by 9. There were 2 Swiss women who immigrated back to Switzerland. At the same time, there were 41 non-Swiss men and 29 non-Swiss women who immigrated from another country to Switzerland. The total Swiss population change in 2008 (from all sources, including moves across municipal borders) was an increase of 48 and the non-Swiss population increased by 62 people. This represents a population growth rate of 3.8%.

The age distribution, as of 2009, in Avenches is; 349 children or 11.4% of the population are between 0 and 9 years old and 376 teenagers or 12.3% are between 10 and 19. Of the adult population, 404 people or 13.2% of the population are between 20 and 29 years old. 426 people or 13.9% are between 30 and 39, 508 people or 16.6% are between 40 and 49, and 375 people or 12.3% are between 50 and 59. The senior population distribution is 301 people or 9.8% of the population are between 60 and 69 years old, 198 people or 6.5% are between 70 and 79, there are 101 people or 3.3% who are 80 and 89, and there are 22 people or 0.7% who are 90 and older.

As of 2000, there were 982 people who were single and never married in the municipality. There were 1,259 married individuals, 165 widows or widowers and 138 individuals who are divorced.

As of 2000, there were 1,094 private households in the municipality, and an average of 2.3 persons per household. There were 337 households that consist of only one person and 69 households with five or more people. Out of a total of 1,074 households that answered this question, 31.4% were households made up of just one person and there were 5 adults who lived with their parents. Of the rest of the households, there are 300 married couples without children, 339 married couples with children There were 58 single parents with a child or children. There were 9 households that were made up of unrelated people and 26 households that were made up of some sort of institution or another collective housing.

In 2000 there were 320 single family homes (or 52.1% of the total) out of a total of 614 inhabited buildings. There were 138 multi-family buildings (22.5%), along with 91 multi-purpose buildings that were mostly used for housing (14.8%) and 65 other use buildings (commercial or industrial) that also had some housing (10.6%). Of the single family homes 69 were built before 1919, while 25 were built between 1990 and 2000. The most multi-family homes (49) were built before 1919 and the next most (22) were built between 1961 and 1970. There was 1 multi-family house built between 1996 and 2000.

In 2000 there were 1,266 apartments in the municipality. The most common apartment size was 3 rooms of which there were 399. There were 76 single room apartments and 254 apartments with five or more rooms. Of these apartments, a total of 1,022 apartments (80.7% of the total) were permanently occupied, while 173 apartments (13.7%) were seasonally occupied and 71 apartments (5.6%) were empty. As of 2009, the construction rate of new housing units was 35.9 new units per 1000 residents. The vacancy rate for the municipality, in 2010, was 0.67%.

The historical population is given in the following chart:

== Heritage sites of national significance ==
The Roman ruins of Aventicum, Avenches Castle, the Cure at Rue du Jura 2, the Swiss Reformed Church, the Temple à Donatyre and the Tour de l’évêque (Bishops tower) with amphitheater and Roman Museum are listed as Swiss heritage site of national significance. The entire town of Avenches and the Swiss National Stud Farm area are part of the Inventory of Swiss Heritage Sites.

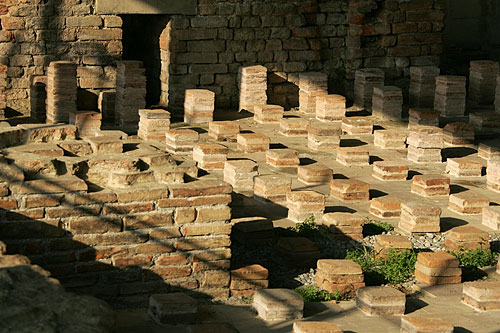
Aventicum

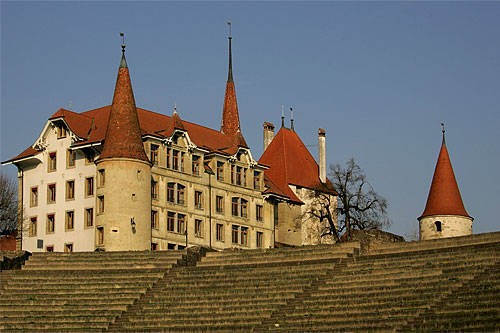
Avenches Castle

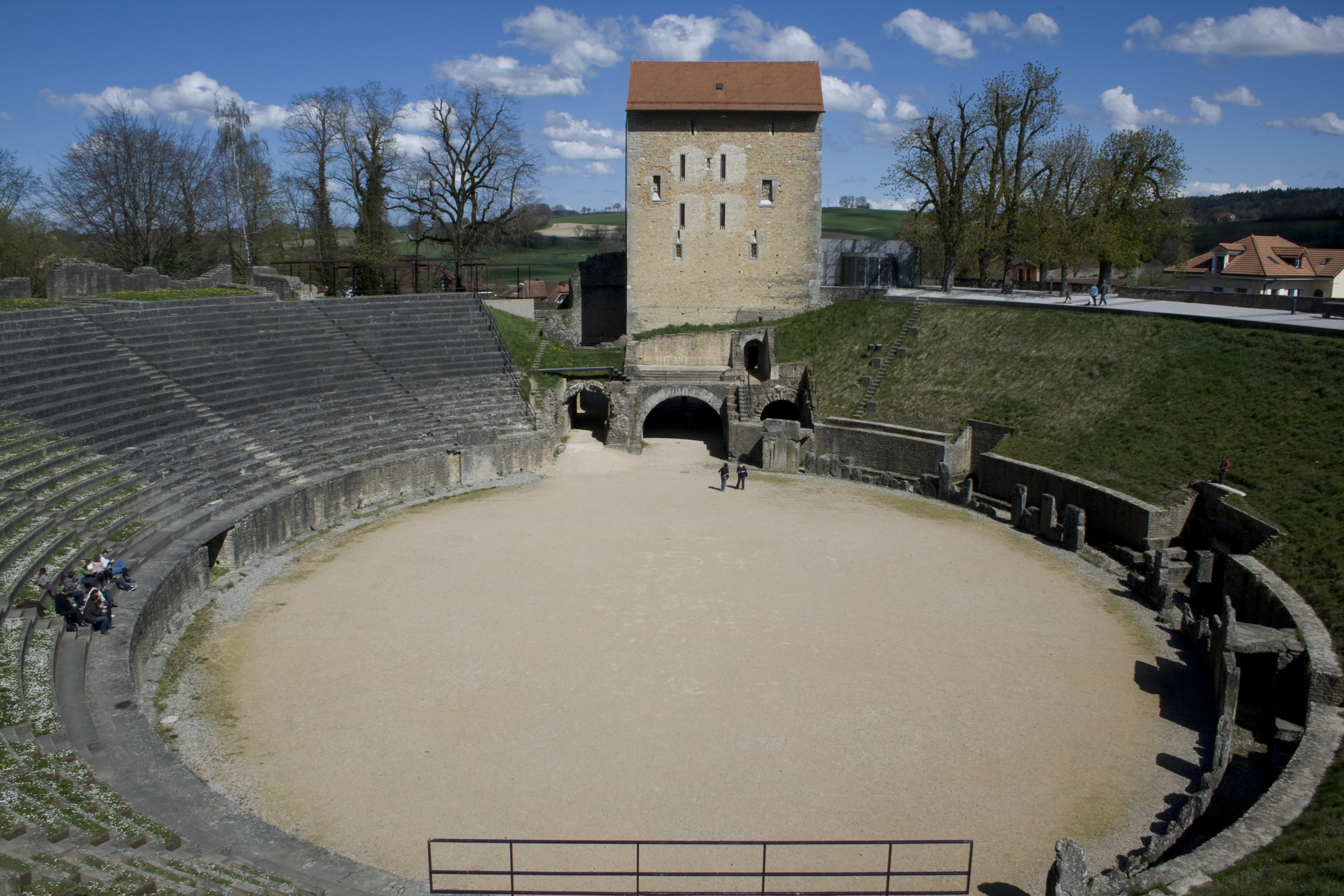
L’évêque Tower with Amphitheatre and Roman Museum

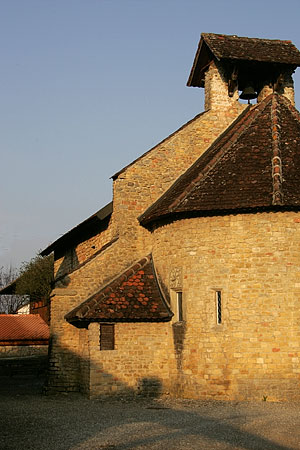
Temple à Donatyre

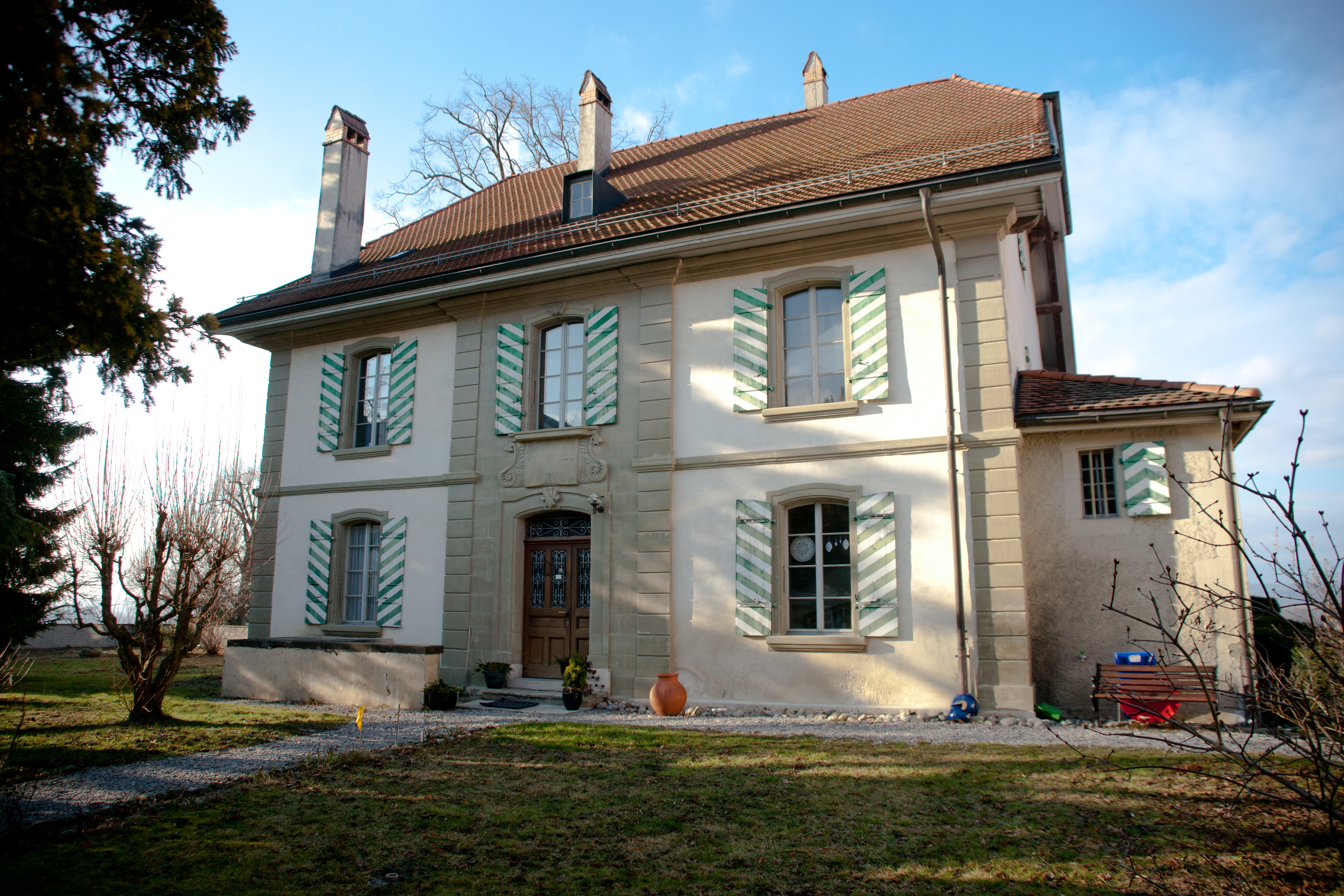
Cure

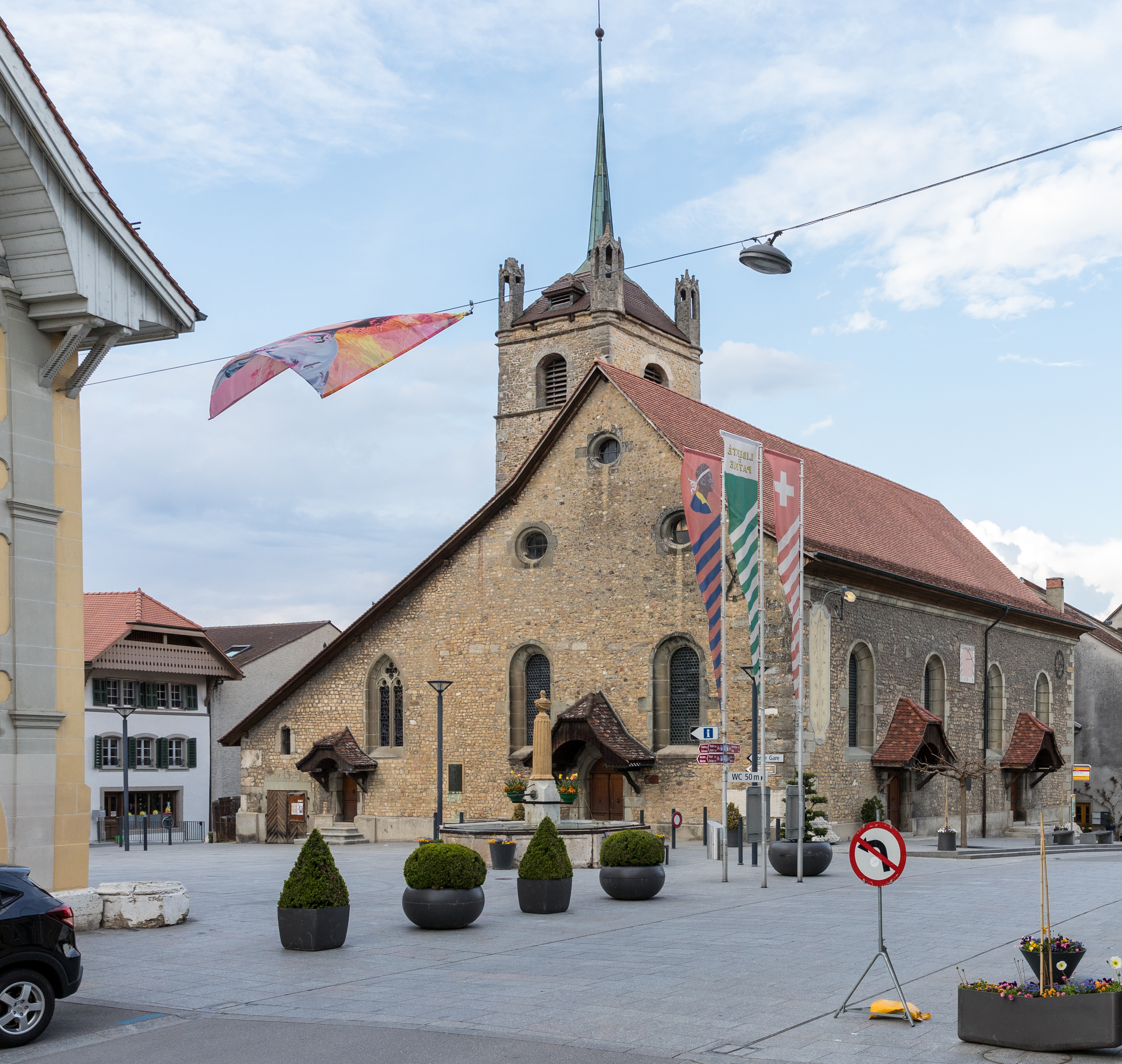
Church Sainte Madeleine

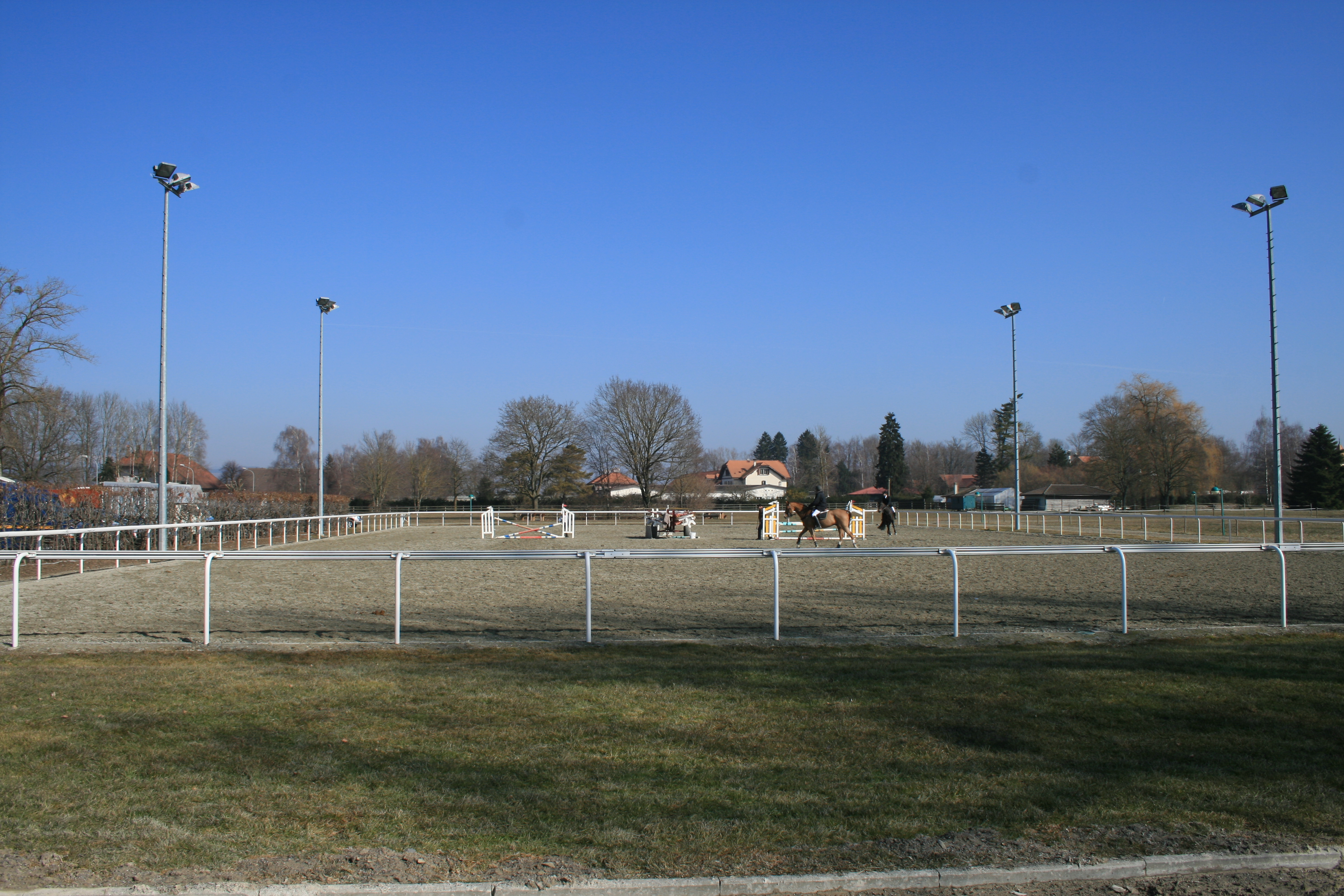
Riding fields at the Haras National Suisse

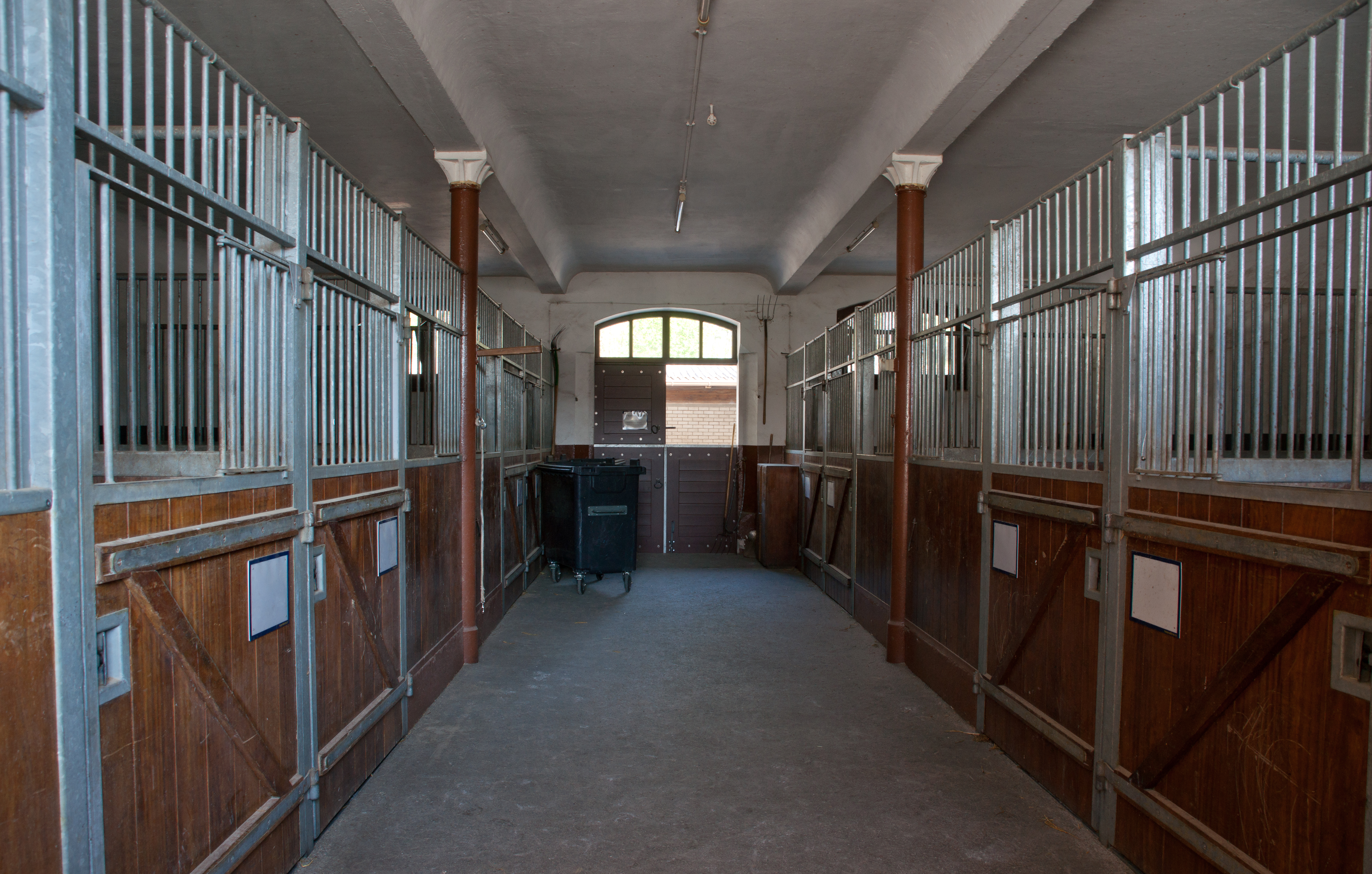
Stables at the Haras National Suisse

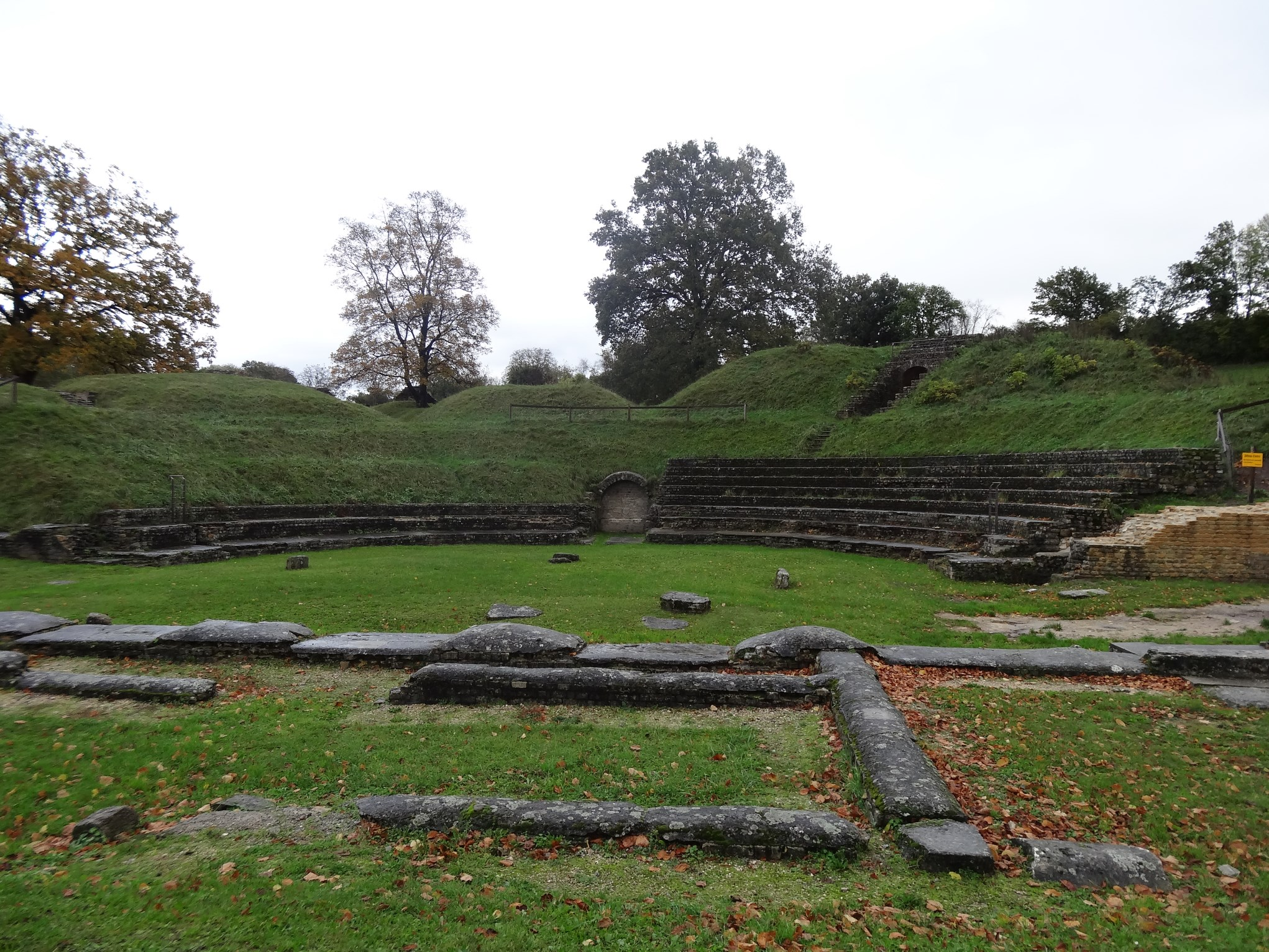
Theater

== Politics ==
In the 2007 federal election the most popular party was the SP which received 29.08% of the vote. The next three most popular parties were the SVP (26.61%), the FDP (18.92%) and the Green Party (9.6%). In the federal election, a total of 597 votes were cast, and the voter turnout was 37.9%.

== Economy ==
As of 2010, Avenches had an unemployment rate of 4.6%. As of 2008, there were 117 people employed in the primary economic sector and about 27 businesses involved in this sector. 283 people were employed in the secondary sector and there were 41 businesses in this sector. 1,200 people were employed in the tertiary sector, with 138 businesses in this sector. There were 1,285 residents of the municipality who were employed in some capacity, of which females made up 42.6% of the workforce.

In 2008 the total number of full-time equivalent jobs was 1,368. The number of jobs in the primary sector was 99, of which 97 were in agriculture and 2 were in forestry or lumber production. The number of jobs in the secondary sector was 267 of which 193 or (72.3%) were in manufacturing and 70 (26.2%) were in construction. The number of jobs in the tertiary sector was 1,002. In the tertiary sector; 524 or 52.3% were in wholesale or retail sales or the repair of motor vehicles, 74 or 7.4% were in the movement and storage of goods, 106 or 10.6% were in a hotel or restaurant, 4 or 0.4% were in the information industry, 10 or 1.0% were the insurance or financial industry, 36 or 3.6% were technical professionals or scientists, 60 or 6.0% were in education and 95 or 9.5% were in health care.

In 2000, there were 761 workers who commuted into the municipality and 690 workers who commuted away. The municipality is a net importer of workers, with about 1.1 workers entering the municipality for every one leaving. Of the working population, 9% used public transportation to get to work, and 63.6% used a private car.

== Religion ==
From the 2000 census, 966 or 38.0% were Roman Catholic, while 1,032 or 40.6% belonged to the Swiss Reformed Church. Of the rest of the population, there were 8 members of an Orthodox church (or about 0.31% of the population), and there were 37 individuals (or about 1.45% of the population) who belonged to another Christian church. There were 157 (or about 6.17% of the population) who were Islamic. There were 4 individuals who were Buddhist and 2 individuals who belonged to another church. 196 (or about 7.70% of the population) belonged to no church, are agnostic or atheist, and 142 individuals (or about 5.58% of the population) did not answer the question.

== Weather ==
Avenches has an average of 121.8 days of rain or snow per year and on average receives 981 mm (38.6 in) of precipitation. The wettest month is June during which time Avenches receives an average of 102 mm (4.0 in) of rain or snow. During this month there is precipitation for an average of 11.1 days. The month with the most days of precipitation is May, with an average of 12.5, but with only 99 mm (3.9 in) of rain or snow. The driest month of the year is February with an average of 63 mm (2.5 in) of precipitation over 9.6 days.

== Education ==
In Avenches about 804 or (31.6%) of the population have completed non-mandatory upper secondary education, and 220 or (8.6%) have completed additional higher education (either university or a Fachhochschule). Of the 220 who completed tertiary schooling, 59.5% were Swiss men, 28.6% were Swiss women, 8.2% were non-Swiss men and 3.6% were non-Swiss women.

In the 2009/2010 school year there were a total of 396 students in the Avenches school district. In the Vaud cantonal school system, two years of non-obligatory pre-school are provided by the political districts. During the school year, the political district provided pre-school care for a total of 155 children of which 83 children (53.5%) received subsidized pre-school care. The canton's primary school program requires students to attend for four years. There were 212 students in the municipal primary school program. The obligatory lower secondary school program lasts for six years and there were 174 students in those schools. There were also 10 students who were home schooled or attended another non-traditional school. Avenches is home to 1 museum, the Musée romain d'Avenches. In 2009 it was visited by 17,280 visitors. In 2009 the Musée romain d'Avenches was visited by 17,280 visitors (the average in previous years was 18,742).

As of 2000, there were 285 students in Avenches who came from another municipality, while 116 residents attended schools outside the municipality.

== Transportation ==
The municipality has a railway station, Avenches, on the Palézieux–Lyss railway line. It has regular service to Lausanne, Bern, and Kerzers.

== Notable people ==
- Marius of Avenches (532 – 596), the Bishop of Aventicum (modern Avenches) from 574, sixth century chronicler
- Fredegar – Seventh century Frankish historian, wrote the Chronicle of Fredegar shortly before 642 AD
- Ernest Failloubaz (1892 in Avenches – 1919), Swiss aviation pioneer
- Loulou Boulaz (1908 in Avenches – 1991), a Swiss mountain climber and alpine skier who made numerous first ascents in the Alps

== See also ==
- Aventicum
- District of Avenches
