= Delley =

Former municipality, canton of Fribourg

- Former municipality
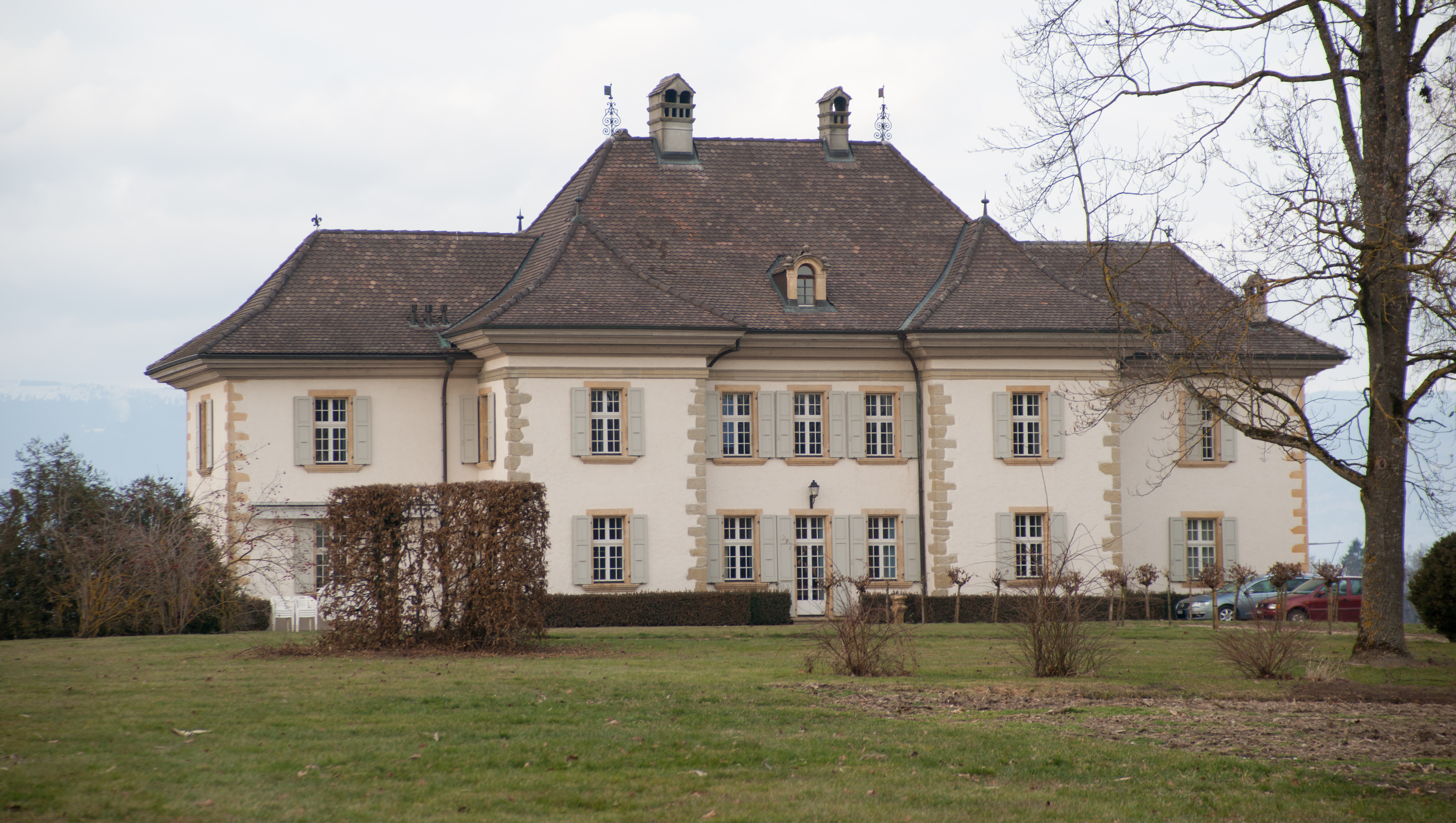
- Castella Castle
- Location of Delley
- Location within Switzerland Location within Canton of Fribourg
- Coordinates: 46.9134°N 6.9676°E
- Country: Switzerland
- Canton: Fribourg
- District: Broye
- Municipality: Delley-Portalban

Population (2000)
  - Total: 414
- Time zone: UTC+01:00 (CET)
  - Summer (DST): UTC+02:00 (CEST)
- ISO 3166 code: CH-FR
- Website

Delley is a former municipality in the Broye district of the canton of Fribourg, Switzerland. In 2005 it merged with Portalban to form the municipality of Delley-Portalban. Its territory comprised the village of Delley and the eastern part of Portalban on the shore of Lake Neuchâtel.

== History ==
Delley is first mentioned in 1342 as Deler. In 1268 the lordship of Delley, which included Portalban, was acquired by the d'Agnens or d'Asnens family, who later bore sometimes the name d'Agnens and sometimes that of Delley. Agnens was probably no more than a hamlet between Saint-Aubin and Vallon; it disappeared in the 16th century. In 1224 and 1239 the d'Agnens family held property in Delley as a fief of the chapter of Lausanne Cathedral; the fief passed from the chapter to Peter of Savoy.

From the 14th century the lordship was divided up. In 1679 it was bought by the Castella family, who at the beginning of the 18th century built a country house, flanked by two pavilions in 1774–1776. After the Revolution they remained the owners of the estate. Delley belonged to the bailiwick of Estavayer from 1536, to the district of the same name in 1798, to that of Montagny in 1804 and to that of Dompierre from 1831 to 1848.

In church matters, Delley separated from Saint-Aubin in 1858 to form a parish with Portalban. The church, dating from 1488, was rebuilt in 1713. Livestock farming, fishing and diversified crop farming are practiced. The service sector has grown through tourism, with a campsite (1971) and a harbor for small boats (1983).

Delley had 251 inhabitants in 1811, 315 in 1850, 337 in 1900, 358 in 1950, 299 in 1960 and 414 in 2000. In 2005 it merged with Portalban to form Delley-Portalban.

== Bibliography ==
- A. Dellion, Dictionnaire historique et statistique des paroisses catholiques du canton de Fribourg, vol. 4, pp. 479–498
- F. Brülhart, Saint-Aubin, 1932
- B. de Vevey, Châteaux et maisons fortes du canton de Fribourg, 1978, pp. 96–99
- Le passé apprivoisé, exhibition catalogue, Fribourg, 1992, pp. 43–44
