= Portalban =

Former municipality, canton of Fribourg

- Former municipality
- Location of Portalban
- Location within Switzerland Location within Canton of Fribourg
- Coordinates: 46.9181°N 6.9562°E
- Country: Switzerland
- Canton: Fribourg
- District: Broye
- Municipality: Delley-Portalban

Population (2000)
  - Total: 251
- Time zone: UTC+01:00 (CET)
  - Summer (DST): UTC+02:00 (CEST)
- ISO 3166 code: CH-FR
- Website

Portalban (old German name Portelbank) is a former municipality in the Broye district of the canton of Fribourg, Switzerland. In 2005 it merged with Delley to form the municipality of Delley-Portalban. On the south shore of Lake Neuchâtel, its territory comprised the village of Portalban-Dessous, whose eastern part belonged to Delley, and the hamlet of Portalban-Dessus. Five Neolithic and Bronze Age lake-dwelling sites lie off the village.

== Prehistory and antiquity ==
Five lake-dwelling sites have been identified off the village of Portalban, the first of them recognized as such in 1858. These Neolithic and Bronze Age deposits were looted and then test-excavated for nearly a century. The site of Delley-Portalban II was the subject of fifteen campaigns of systematic excavation between 1962 and 1979.

The value of this archaeological site rests on three main factors. First, a stratigraphic sequence nearly 3 m high covers more than a millennium of human occupation (3600–2450 BC), in which the whole cultural development from the end of the Middle Neolithic to the Final Neolithic can be followed. Second, the extent of the area explored and documented (17,500 m^{2} in all) made it possible to study the first farming and sedentary populations of the Three Lakes region from a socio-economic point of view. Third, the variety, quantity and remarkable state of preservation of the finds make it one of the reference prehistoric settlements in Switzerland. Dendrochronological analysis of several hundred well-preserved piles has produced a very detailed sequence of the site's occupation and revealed complex architectural structures (house plans, palisades). Petrographic and mineralogical analyses, among others, have refined knowledge of long-distance exchange, of craft techniques (weaving, the making of polished stone axes, antler-working workshops) and of the hunting and stock-raising practices specific to the region.

In 1900 a coin hoard of twenty-one coins, nineteen of them gold, struck between AD 15 and 80, was found by chance on the lakeshore.

== History ==
Portalban is first mentioned in 1166 as Portubanni. In the Middle Ages it was part of the lordship of Delley, which the lords of Agnens or Asnens acquired in 1268. Knights of Portalban, from the Agnens-de Delley branch, are recorded from the 14th century. In 1506 Humbert de La Molière sold his share of the lordship of Portalban to the council of Fribourg; it was then attached to the bailiwick of Estavayer (1536–1798) and to the districts of Avenches (1798–1803), Montagny (1803–1830) and Dompierre (1831–1848). The chapel of Saint-Jacques (mentioned in 1166, no longer extant) was given by Amadeus, bishop of Lausanne, to the priory of Saint-Maire. In church matters, Portalban belonged half to Carignan and half to Saint-Aubin; the parish of Delley-Portalban was formed in 1858.

Before the Jura water correction (1868–1891), trade with Neuchâtel (animals, printed cottons or indiennes, and salt) kept the port busy. Many women worked at home for the Fabrique-Neuve de Cortaillod, and from 1778 to 1798 there was an indienne factory in Portalban. A toll office existed from 1804 to 1848. Once a village of fishermen and farmers, Portalban has seen tourist (harbor, campsite) and residential development.

Portalban had 112 inhabitants in 1811, 141 in 1850, 156 in 1900, 183 in 1950, 143 in 1970 and 251 in 2000. In 2005 it merged with Delley to form Delley-Portalban.

== Bibliography ==
- F. Brülhart, Saint-Aubin, 1932
- Almanach de la Broye vaudoise et fribourgeoise, du Jorat et du Vully, 1966, pp. 71–75
- W. Bodmer, "Die Indienneindustrie im Gebiete des heutigen Kantons Freiburg im 18. Jahrhundert", in Freiburger Geschichtsblätter, 53, 1969, pp. 35–71
- B. de Vevey, Châteaux et maisons fortes du canton de Fribourg, 1978, pp. 96–99
- D. Ramseyer et al., Delley/Portalban II, 3 vols., 1987–1991
- D. Bonny, A.-F. Auberson, "Portalban, trésor monétaire ... trésor d'histoire", in Cahiers d'archéologie fribourgeoise, 2, 2000, pp. 18–25
