= Les Friques =

Former municipality, canton of Fribourg

- Former municipality
- Chapel of the Immaculate Conception and Saint Nicholas
- Location of Les Friques
- Location within Switzerland Location within Canton of Fribourg
- Coordinates: 46.900001°N 6.983338°E
- Country: Switzerland
- Canton: Fribourg
- District: Broye
- Municipality: Saint-Aubin

Population (1990)
  - Total: 51
- Time zone: UTC+01:00 (CET)
  - Summer (DST): UTC+02:00 (CEST)
- ISO 3166 code: CH-FR
- Website

Les Friques is a former municipality in the Broye district of the canton of Fribourg, Switzerland. It merged into the municipality of Saint-Aubin in 1991. Les Friques forms a single settlement with Villars-le-Grand in the canton of Vaud, although the two municipalities were always separate. The road from Avenches to Portalban is the municipal and cantonal boundary.

== History ==
Les Friques is first mentioned in 1429 as Villard en Vully devers le vent; in 1584 it appears as Villard des Friques. A fief of the lordship of Grandcour and, from 1444, of that of Saint-Aubin, Les Friques belonged to the bailiwick of Saint-Aubin, then to the districts of Avenches from 1798, of Montagny from 1803 and of Dompierre from 1830 to 1848. It belonged to the parish of Saint-Aubin. A chapel dedicated to the Immaculate Conception and to Saint Nicholas was built in 1757–1758. There was a school from the end of the 17th century.

Les Friques is a rural locality where cereals are grown and livestock is raised. It had 78 inhabitants in 1811, 71 in 1850, 66 in 1900, 69 in 1950 and 51 in 1990. In 1991 it merged into Saint-Aubin.

== Bibliography ==
- F. Brülhart, Saint-Aubin, 1932 (2nd edition 1988)
- A. Bardet, Villars en Vully, mon village, 1983
- I. Biolley, Les Friques au XIXe siècle, étude d'une communauté rurale, licentiate thesis, Fribourg, 1986
- La Liberté, 22 January 1991
