= Missy, Switzerland =

Missy
- Municipality
- Flag Coat of arms
- Location of Missy
- Location within Switzerland Location within Canton of Vaud
- Coordinates: 46°53′N 6°58′E
- Country: Switzerland
- Canton: Vaud
- District: Broye-Vully

Government
  - Mayor: Syndic

Area
  - Total: 3.11 km^{2} (1.20 sq mi)
- Elevation: 442 m (1,450 ft)

Population (2003)
  - Total: 287
  - Density: 92.3/km^{2} (239/sq mi)
- Time zone: UTC+01:00 (CET)
  - Summer (DST): UTC+02:00 (CEST)
- Postal code: 1565
- SFOS number: 5821
- ISO 3166 code: CH-VD
- Surrounded by: Corcelles-près-Payerne, Belmont-Broye (FR), Saint-Aubin (FR), Vallon (FR)
- Website: www.missy.ch

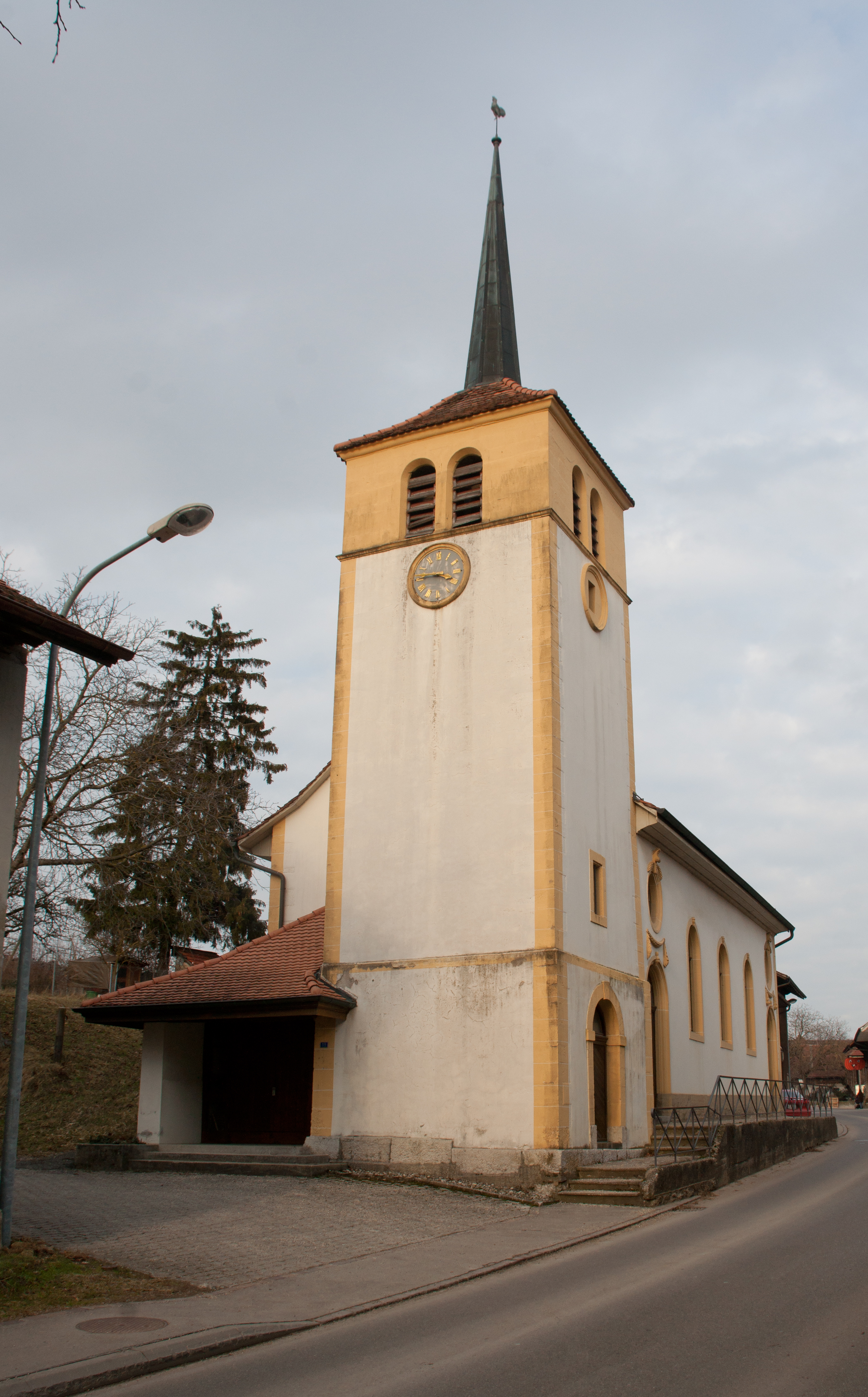
Missy, Vaud, Switzerland: Protestant church, located in the center of the village. This photo is dated January 25, 2011.

Missy is a municipality in the district of Broye-Vully in the canton of Vaud in Switzerland.

== History ==
Missy is first mentioned in 1148 as Missiacum (Vidimus). In 1183 it was mentioned as de Missiaco. Formerly it was known by the German name Missach.

== Geography ==
Missy has an area, as of 2009, of 3.11 square kilometers (1.20 sq mi). Of this area, 2.62 km^{2} (1.01 sq mi) or 84.2% is used for agricultural purposes, while 0.1 km^{2} (0.039 sq mi) or 3.2% is forested. Of the rest of the land, 0.3 km^{2} (0.12 sq mi) or 9.6% is settled (buildings or roads), 0.03 km^{2} (7.4 acres) or 1.0% is either rivers or lakes.

Of the built up area, housing and buildings made up 4.5% and transportation infrastructure made up 4.5%. Out of the forested land, 0.0% of the total land area is heavily forested and 3.2% is covered with orchards or small clusters of trees. Of the agricultural land, 67.2% is used for growing crops and 14.8% is pastures, while 2.3% is used for orchards or vine crops. All the water in the municipality is flowing water.

The municipality was part of the Payerne District until it was dissolved on 31 August 2006, and Missy became part of the new district of Broye-Vully.

It consists of the linear village of Missy.

== Coat of arms ==
The blazon of the municipal coat of arms is Per pale Argent and Gules, a capital M counterchanged.

== Demographics ==
Missy has a population (as of December 2020) of 368. As of 2008, 8.9% of the population are resident foreign nationals. Over the last 10 years (1999–2009) the population has changed at a rate of 13.5%. It has changed at a rate of 8.9% due to migration and at a rate of 3.9% due to births and deaths.

Most of the population (as of 2000) speaks French (238 or 86.5%), with German being second most common (30 or 10.9%) and Portuguese being third (4 or 1.5%). There is 1 person who speaks Italian.

Of the population in the municipality 124 or about 45.1% were born in Missy and lived there in 2000. There were 38 or 13.8% who were born in the same canton, while 75 or 27.3% were born somewhere else in Switzerland, and 28 or 10.2% were born outside of Switzerland.

In 2008 there were 5 live births to Swiss citizens and 1 birth to non-Swiss citizens, and in same time span there was 1 death of a Swiss citizen. Ignoring immigration and emigration, the population of Swiss citizens increased by 4 while the foreign population increased by 1. There was 1 non-Swiss man and 6 non-Swiss women who immigrated from another country to Switzerland. The total Swiss population change in 2008 (from all sources, including moves across municipal borders) was an increase of 7 and the non-Swiss population increased by 7 people. This represents a population growth rate of 4.7%.

The age distribution, as of 2009, in Missy is; 30 children or 9.4% of the population are between 0 and 9 years old and 45 teenagers or 14.1% are between 10 and 19. Of the adult population, 45 people or 14.1% of the population are between 20 and 29 years old. 50 people or 15.7% are between 30 and 39, 46 people or 14.4% are between 40 and 49, and 31 people or 9.7% are between 50 and 59. The senior population distribution is 33 people or 10.3% of the population are between 60 and 69 years old, 27 people or 8.5% are between 70 and 79, there are 10 people or 3.1% who are between 80 and 89, and there are 2 people or 0.6% who are 90 and older.

As of 2000, there were 131 people who were single and never married in the municipality. There were 118 married individuals, 18 widows or widowers and 8 individuals who are divorced.

As of 2000, there were 106 private households in the municipality, and an average of 2.5 persons per household. There were 35 households that consist of only one person and 13 households with five or more people. Out of a total of 112 households that answered this question, 31.3% were households made up of just one person and there was 1 adult who lived with their parents. Of the rest of the households, there are 25 married couples without children, 38 married couples with children There were 6 single parents with a child or children. There was 1 household that was made up of unrelated people and 6 households that were made up of some sort of institution or another collective housing.

In 2000 there were 34 single family homes (or 43.6% of the total) out of a total of 78 inhabited buildings. There were 18 multi-family buildings (23.1%), along with 22 multi-purpose buildings that were mostly used for housing (28.2%) and 4 other use buildings (commercial or industrial) that also had some housing (5.1%). Of the single family homes 16 were built before 1919, while 2 were built between 1990 and 2000. The most multi-family homes (5) were built between 1919 and 1945 and the next most (4) were built before 1919.

In 2000 there were 117 apartments in the municipality. The most common apartment size was 3 rooms of which there were 35. There were 3 single room apartments and 43 apartments with five or more rooms. Of these apartments, a total of 104 apartments (88.9% of the total) were permanently occupied, while 8 apartments (6.8%) were seasonally occupied and 5 apartments (4.3%) were empty. As of 2009, the construction rate of new housing units was 12.5 new units per 1000 residents. The vacancy rate for the municipality, in 2010, was 1.44%.

The historical population is given in the following chart:

== Politics ==
In the 2007 federal election the most popular party was the SVP which received 41.23% of the vote. The next three most popular parties were the FDP (19.68%), the Green Party (15.88%) and the LPS Party (8.5%). In the federal election, a total of 108 votes were cast, and the voter turnout was 51.4%.

== Economy ==
As of 2010, Missy had an unemployment rate of 2.4%. As of 2008, there were 55 people employed in the primary economic sector and about 20 businesses involved in this sector. 13 people were employed in the secondary sector and there were 2 businesses in this sector. 7 people were employed in the tertiary sector, with 2 businesses in this sector. There were 147 residents of the municipality who were employed in some capacity, of which females made up 36.7% of the workforce.

In 2008 the total number of full-time equivalent jobs was 53. The number of jobs in the primary sector was 36, all of which were in agriculture. The number of jobs in the secondary sector was 13, all of which were in manufacturing. The number of jobs in the tertiary sector was 4. In the tertiary sector; 2 were in a hotel or restaurant and 3 were in education.

In 2000, there were 13 workers who commuted into the municipality and 64 workers who commuted away. The municipality is a net exporter of workers, with about 4.9 workers leaving the municipality for every one entering. Of the working population, 2% used public transportation to get to work, and 48.3% used a private car.

== Religion ==
Missy, Vaud, Switzerland. Photo taken at the center of the village, around 1965. Following the fountain, located in the foreground, appear, chronologically: the dairy, the old post office, the primary school, the bell tower of the Protestant church.

From the 2000 census, 43 or 15.6% were Roman Catholic, while 209 or 76.0% belonged to the Swiss Reformed Church. Of the rest of the population, and there were 6 individuals (or about 2.18% of the population) who belonged to another Christian church. 13 (or about 4.73% of the population) belonged to no church, are agnostic or atheist, and 3 individuals (or about 1.09% of the population) did not answer the question.

== Education ==
In Missy about 88 or (32.0%) of the population have completed non-mandatory upper secondary education, and 32 or (11.6%) have completed additional higher education (either university or a Fachhochschule). Of the 32 who completed tertiary schooling, 56.3% were Swiss men, 37.5% were Swiss women.

In the 2009/2010 school year there were a total of 37 students in the Missy school district. In the Vaud cantonal school system, two years of non-obligatory pre-school are provided by the political districts. During the school year, the political district provided pre-school care for a total of 155 children of which 83 children (53.5%) received subsidized pre-school care. The canton's primary school program requires students to attend for four years. There were 17 students in the municipal primary school program. The obligatory lower secondary school program lasts for six years and there were 18 students in those schools. There were also 2 students who were home schooled or attended another non-traditional school.

As of 2000, there were 18 students in Missy who came from another municipality, while 23 residents attended schools outside the municipality.
