= Bronze Age in Switzerland =

Period of Swiss prehistory from 2200 to 800 BC

- Alternative names: Swiss Bronze Age
- Geographical range: Switzerland
- Period: Bronze Age
- Dates: c. 2200–800 BC
- Major sites: Arbon-Bleiche, Concise, Zurich-Mozartstrasse, Hauterive, Morges
- Preceded by: Neolithic, Stone Age
- Followed by: Iron Age, Hallstatt period

Bronze Age in Switzerland refers to the period of Swiss prehistory from approximately 2200 to 800 BC, which was characterized by the widespread use of bronze tools and weapons. This period succeeded the Neolithic period and preceded the Hallstatt period. The term "Bronze Age" was first applied to Swiss archaeological material by Frédéric Troyon in 1860, applyinh the three-age system of Danish archaeologists Christian Jürgensen Thomsen (1836) and Jens Jacob Asmussen Worsaae (1857).

== History of research and sources ==
Early archaeological investigations in Switzerland focused primarily on burial sites containing metal grave goods, including stone-lined graves with bronze jewelry and weapons discovered in western Switzerland and near Lake Thun (at Aigle, Ollon, and Thun-Renzenbühl). These sites, now recognized as Early Bronze Age settlements, represented the first systematic discoveries of Bronze Age material in the region.

In northern areas of the Swiss Plateau, research initially concentrated on tumuli, which primarily contained Iron Age burials but also revealed some Middle Bronze Age graves, such as those at Weiach in 1866. Cremation burials from the Late Bronze Age were also identified relatively early, particularly when they contained significant metal deposits, as occurred at Mels in 1871.

The discovery of pile-dwelling sites marked a significant shift in research focus. Johannes Aeppli's discovery of Early Bronze Age pile dwellings at Obermeilen on Lake Zurich in 1853-1854 prompted Ferdinand Keller, president of the Antiquarian Society of Zurich, to conduct comparative studies. Keller's methodological approach, which he applied to pottery analysis, successfully linked lakeside settlements with hilltop sites.

Dendrochronology revolutionized Bronze Age research beginning in 1962 with investigations at the lakeside site of Zug-Sumpf. This method provides precise dating for the felling of construction timber and enables detailed reconstruction of house and village plans. Research revealed that the dense concentrations of piles observed at multiple sites resulted from numerous successive phases of habitation and activity, sometimes separated by long periods of abandonment.

== Chronology and regional subdivisions ==
The Bronze Age is divided into three main phases: Early Bronze Age (2200-1500 BC), Middle Bronze Age (1500-1300 BC), and Late Bronze Age (1300-800 BC). Dendrochronology provides precise dating for the later phases of the Early Bronze Age and the Late Bronze Age, while radiocarbon dating is used for the intervening period, offering precision of approximately ±100 years in optimal cases.

Regional cultural variations reflected Switzerland's diverse geography and the influence of topography on cultural formation. During this period, when terrestrial transport was slow, waterways, Alpine passes, and Jura gorges concentrated circulation and trade.

The Rhône Valley and Lake Geneva region formed a zone open to technical progress and active in metalworking during the Early Bronze Age, as evidenced by funerary material. The Lake Geneva region maintained close relationships with the middle Rhône Valley and Savoy. These connections gave rise to the concept of a "Rhône civilization."

The Three Lakes region (lakes Neuchâtel, Biel, and Murten) maintained relationships with Jura valleys extending to the Saône, as well as connections southward to Lake Geneva and along the Aare toward the Rhine. This region, with lands suitable for agriculture and livestock, occupied a crossroads position that proved advantageous during a period of increasing trade.

Central and northern Switzerland formed part of the upper Rhine cultural domain during the Late Bronze Age. The Lake Constance region and Thur Valley remained oriented toward the north and east, toward the Hegau and Danube Valley. The Lake Zurich basin served as a crossroads, sometimes turning toward the northeast, with evidence of relationships with the St. Gallen Rhine valley and the Alps.

South of the Alps, only the Mesolcina and Ticino, and only for the Late Bronze Age, show evidence of continuous occupation through archaeological material. Ticino formed the northern branch of a cultural group established in western Lombardy and Piedmont (the Canegrate group, precursor to the Golasecca culture). Objects influenced by or imported from south of the Alps are found in Valais and locally in the Canton of Fribourg and Aare valley.

== Settlement patterns and distribution ==
Climate conditions during the 2nd millennium BC were generally favorable, although several cold periods affected lake levels and lakeside settlements. A cold phase beginning around 1450 BC caused Alpine glacier advances (Löbben cold phase), while another advance occurred around 1200-1100 BC, preceding the Late Bronze Age lakeside sites phase. A third, apparently longer climatic deterioration around 750 BC coincided with the beginning of the Hallstatt period.

The dramatic increase in archaeological discoveries suggests growing settlement density throughout the Bronze Age. During the Late Bronze Age, for the first time in Switzerland, settlements were built covering areas of 1-2 hectares. When possible, dendrochronological dating allows certain identification of houses that coexisted within a village.

=== Early Bronze Age ===
After a long interruption, lakeshores of the Swiss Plateau were reoccupied from 1900 BC onward. The number of these settlements experienced strong growth between 1680 and 1500 BC. Among those studied to date, the largest is Arbon-Bleiche (approximately 5,000 m², with an occupation duration of 150-200 years). The site at Concise is also very significant. Besides these lakeside sites forming compact "villages," traces of human activity have been found on heights and along rivers, with preference regularly given to strategic sites where medieval castles would later be built.

The wooden architecture of lakeside villages shows regional particularities. Foundation sills used to stabilize piles, commonly employed between lakes Baldegg and Constance, have no equivalent in western Switzerland. On Jura lakes and Lake Geneva, piles constitute the only preserved construction elements. Only the Zurich-Mozartstrasse site has revealed a triple row of houses, probably each divided into two rooms, built on ground sills and including posts of 5.5 meters.

=== Middle Bronze Age and early Late Bronze Age ===
The distribution of discovered remains suggests settlement dispersion across the entire Swiss Plateau between 1500 and 1050 BC. Many countryside sites were discovered during national highway construction work. Lakeshores still provide objects, but construction there disappears by the beginning of the Middle Bronze Age at the latest. This suggests a settlement withdrawal phenomenon, with good examples at Erlenbach (ZH) and Cham.

The Middle Bronze Age settlement at Erlenbach is located on the first terrace, 60 meters above the current lake level, while that of Cham-Oberwil, established in a drumlin landscape, is 3.5 kilometers from the lake. Both share the common characteristic of stone foundations intended to reinforce foundations or circulation areas. House walls generally left no other remains than clay plaster.

The extension of cultivated lands in mountain regions constitutes a remarkable phenomenon. Existing settlements were enlarged and new ones established, generally on hills in front of mountain slopes and sheltered from floods and avalanches (Amsteg-Flüeli, Scuol-Kirchhügel), reaching up to 2,003 meters at Boatta Striera (municipality of S-chanf), an extreme case likely intended for temporary occupation.

Climate conditions naturally determined different construction types in Alpine valleys than on the Plateau. At Padnal near Savognin, on the Julier Pass route, houses are arranged in three rows and rest on stone foundations. These are log or post constructions with plank infill. Large hearths or ovens are built inside. In a depression at the edge of the middle row is a rainwater collection basin made of larch planks.

=== Late Bronze Age ===
From approximately 1060 BC, construction resumed on lakeside plateaus. The choice of sites, sometimes far offshore from current shores, indicates very low water levels. Even with raised floors, as at Greifensee-Böschen, the substructure height reaches only 0.7-1.25 meters, one meter below the surface (before modern corrections). Lakeside villages were generally surrounded by palisades, often on all sides, sometimes only on the land side or lake side; in the latter case, this was protection against waves rather than attackers.

Some sites present a truly fortified appearance, with obliquely driven stakes. Village extension and density vary greatly. Small villages (0.25-0.3 hectares), medium ones (0.6-1 hectare), and some over 2 hectares have been identified (Morges-Grande-Cité, Grandson-Corcelettes, Zurich-Wollishofen and Zurich-Alpenquai). On Lake Neuchâtel shores, the preferred form seems to have been small to medium, grouped villages with quasi-orthogonal plans and narrow streets. The lakeside station of Greifensee-Böschen shows, in contrast, a less rigid grouping of constructions of variable dimensions leaving empty spaces between them.

As in the Early Bronze Age, central and northern Switzerland again used the foundation sill system to stabilize piles. This resurgence of an ancient construction method, despite a long interruption of lakeside settlement, argues for a carpentry tradition, although it cannot be determined whether this technique was also used in hinterland sites during the interval.

== Lifestyle, production and circulation ==
The Bronze Age distinguished itself from the preceding Final Neolithic through broader and more functional use of metals. Bronze and, to a much lesser extent, gold were commonly used as symbols of material values and as means of standardization, while signaling social distinctions. This latter role was particularly important in the Early Bronze Age for decorated daggers with bronze handles or decorated plates worn as frontal or pectoral ornaments.

In Switzerland, large-scale production structures for these objects developed only at the end of the Early Bronze Age. Simultaneously, stone tools began giving way to bronze. By the Late Bronze Age, the population had a vast array of metal tools. Parallel to this, commercial traffic volume increased due to the unequal distribution of copper and tin ores in Europe. Tin was added to copper in proportions of approximately 3-10% to improve its fusibility. The resulting alloy, bronze, is distinguished from copper by its golden tint rather than reddish color, and decorative effects were derived from these nuances.

Wide food self-sufficiency is assumed for this period, even in the Alpine domain. Throughout the 2nd millennium BC, clearing caused forest retreat and forest pasture was separated from settlements. It is unclear whether hay was already used as fodder. It appears that soil exhaustion was prevented through crop rotation, fallowing, and livestock manuring. Drought-resistant cereal species like barley and millet, as well as legumes, are well attested, especially in the Late Bronze Age.

The question of using Alpine forest fringes for livestock summer pasturing is debated. No definitive proof can yet be produced, though various Bronze Age tools and weapons - axes, daggers, knives, or spear points - are not uncommon in altitudes now occupied by Alpine pastures. Several hearths situated well above valley floors have been dated to the Bronze Age; some have even yielded ceramic material. While these discoveries indicate passage and exploitation of these lands, they do not suffice to prove the existence of organized Alpine economy with seasonal transhumance.

=== Craftsmanship ===
Metallurgy is the only activity for which relatively abundant archaeological documentation excludes confinement to the domestic framework. For ceramic and textile production, the situation is less clear. Even small lakeside villages possessed a bronzesmith workshop capable of producing common objects such as rings, axes, sickles, or knives. Reflections on product demand and distribution suggest that bronzesmiths' activity was rather seasonal. For more restricted productions like sword casting or bronze vessel hammering, the existence of itinerant specialists can be admitted.

Some imported luxury products, such as amber and ornaments of marine shells or glass, perhaps attest to the existence of vast distribution networks through which more common products that left no traces must also have flowed (salt, linen fabric, livestock). One particular trait of the Central European Bronze Age is the circulation of objects fashioned according to weight and form standards. These objects, already manufactured in series in the Early Bronze Age, were sometimes buried, tied in bundles, in containers, boxes, or pits.

At the lakeside village of Hauterive (NE), hundreds of rings weighing between 0.5 and 2 grams with diameters of 7 to 26 mm were found, isolated or in small groups of similar pieces, including two sets tied with thread, one weighing 250 g, the other 400 g; they represent more than 12% of the bronze collected from the site. These rings sometimes served as pendants but also appear to have been used as currency, suggested not only by the quantity of circulating objects but also by finding them tied to string or larger rings with closures.

=== Transportation ===
During the Bronze Age, the most widespread means of transport was the dugout canoe. Unlike northern Germany or England, Switzerland has not yielded any remains of plank roads to date. Consequently, the role of road transport by carts is unknown. Traffic is attested in deeply cut watercourses, sorts of natural hollow ways, and frequently on Alpine pass routes. It is theoretically possible that horses were used as pack animals, as this animal's presence is known at various Bronze Age sites, but always in small numbers, unlike cattle, whose bones are abundant in village refuse dumps.

The weight of buried bronze deposits provides another element for assessing terrestrial transport organization. Regardless of whether deposits may have had sacred character, in certain cases they seem to be metal loads ready for transport. In Switzerland, unlike what has been observed in the Balkans, the weight of these bundles does not exceed what a man can carry on his back. The Early Bronze Age deposit of Sennwald-Salez, comprising at least 60 axes probably packed in a wooden box, weighed about 13 kg, while the Late Bronze Age raw metal deposit of Schiers weighed 18.7 kg.

== Society ==
There exist, especially for the Late Bronze Age, indications favoring the existence of regional organizational structure superior to the village level. The lower basin of Lake Zurich provides a good example. Near the lake's extremity, two insular establishments were occupied simultaneously with several villages located on the shore. Without arrangement with shore dwellers, islanders could not have ensured their supply, as the lacustrine chalk of the islands is unsuitable for cereal cultivation. Fishing was therefore their only resource, while shore dwellers controlled cultivable hinterland.

Compared to neighboring regions to the north and east, Bronze Age archaeological documents in Switzerland offer little testimony of social distinctions. However, it would be premature to draw conclusions about a supposedly egalitarian society. While there are far fewer necropolises in Switzerland, they present, where they exist, an aspect analogous to those of neighboring countries. From Early Bronze Age to Late Bronze Age, the arrangement and furnishing of burials allow their classification into three categories, the first comprising inhumations occupying a particular position or marked by funerary construction, stone paving, or tumulus.

== Funerary practices ==
Between the Early and Middle Bronze Age, a break appears in funerary rite evolution, a widespread phenomenon accompanied by technological innovation in weaponry. Except for some early examples, it was only in the Middle Bronze Age that funeral mounds were built, most sheltering several adult burials of both sexes and children, suggesting family sepultures. However, the small number of these tumuli shows they served as burials for only a minority of the population whose settlements are known.

Around 1350 BC, a new major change occurred in funerary customs. Already attested here and there previously, cremation became predominant for several centuries. Part of the ruling class, small in number but probably possessing great power, sought to display prestige by being cremated with bronze-decorated chariots. This new custom, well established in southern Germany, has been identified at three sites in Switzerland: Saint-Sulpice, Bern-Kirchenfeld, and Kaisten.

- Otherwise, Late Bronze Age cremation burials are characterized by often abundant ceramic furnishing, while metal offerings, which most often accompanied the deceased on the pyre, were damaged. Burials without metal offerings are much more numerous, but many were assuredly not retained in archaeological documentation.

== Customs ==
Among customs specific to Central Europe during the Bronze Age was the immersion of weapons, notably swords and spear points. The waters of the Rhine, for example, far into the Grisons, have provided evidence of this practice, attested without interruption between 1500 and 800 BC before disappearing as suddenly as it had emerged. The Aare and other watercourses are no exception. This appears to have been primarily an aristocratic ritual, at least deducible from the rarity of burials containing a sword.

The Central European Bronze Age is further characterized by a taste for geometric style, while human and animal representations remain rare, unlike contemporary Scandinavian practice. Western Swiss lakeside sites have yielded some terracotta animal figurines. Perhaps, like bird-shaped rattles, they were used during festivals that must already have marked the course of the year.

== See also ==
- Neolithic in Switzerland
- Paleolithic in Switzerland
- Mesolithic in Switzerland
