= Vallon =

- Municipality
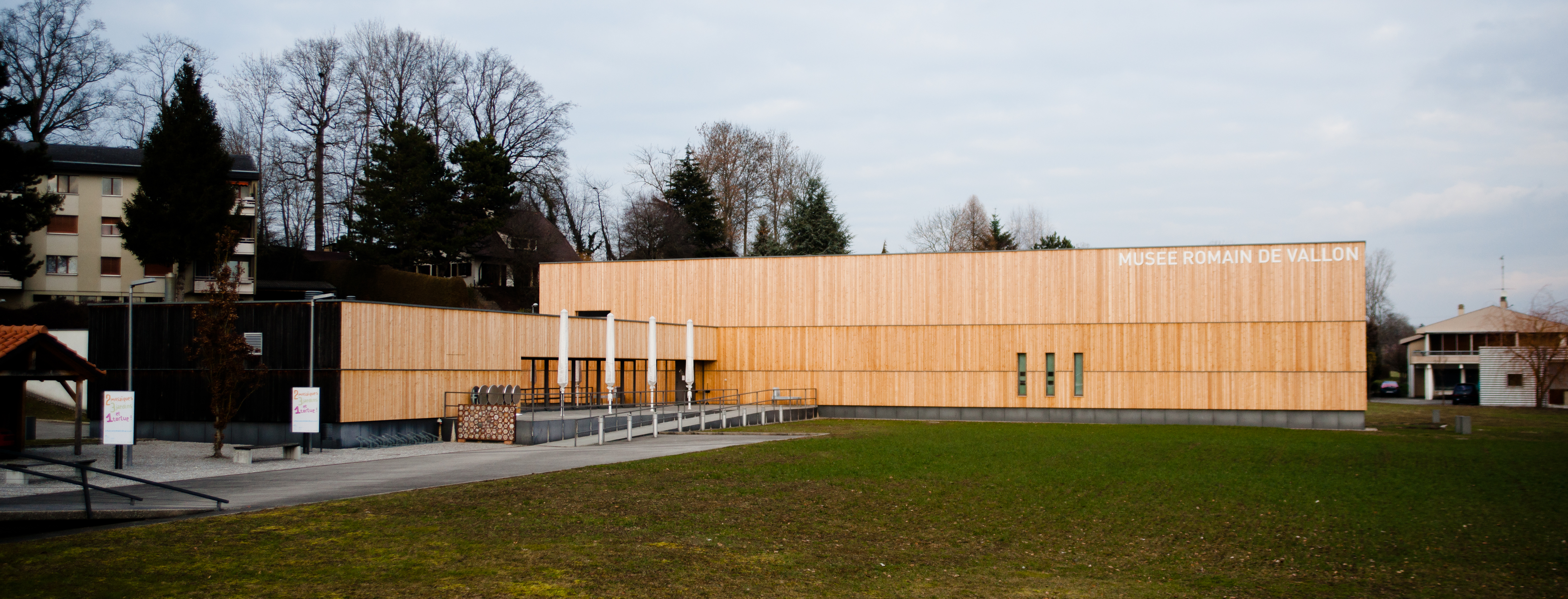
- Roman Museum in Vallon

- Flag Coat of arms
- Location of Vallon
- Location within Switzerland Location within Canton of Fribourg
- Coordinates: 46°53′N 6°57′E
- Country: Switzerland
- Canton: Fribourg
- District: Broye

Government
  - Mayor: Syndic

Area
  - Total: 3.51 km^{2} (1.36 sq mi)
- Elevation: 482 m (1,581 ft)

Population (December 2020)
  - Total: 464
  - Density: 132/km^{2} (342/sq mi)
- Time zone: UTC+01:00 (CET)
  - Summer (DST): UTC+02:00 (CEST)
- Postal code: 1565
- SFOS number: 2045
- ISO 3166 code: CH-FR
- Surrounded by: Corcelles-près-Payerne (VD), Delley-Portalban, Gletterens, Grandcour (VD), Missy (VD), Saint-Aubin
- Website: vallon.ch

Vallon (Arpitan: Valon) is a municipality located in the district of Broye, in the canton of Fribourg, Switzerland.

== History ==
Vallon is first mentioned in 1200 as Valum.

== Geography ==
Vallon has an area, as of 2009, of 3.5 square kilometers (1.4 mi^{2}). Of this area, 3.09 km^{2} (1.19 mi^{2}) or 88.0% is used for agricultural purposes, while 0.12 km^{2} (0.046 mi^{2}) or 3.4% is forested. Of the rest of the land, 0.31 km^{2} (0.12 mi^{2}) or 8.8% is settled (buildings or roads).

Of the built up area, housing and buildings made up 4.0% and transportation infrastructure made up 2.3%. Power and water infrastructure as well as other special developed areas made up 2.3% of the area Out of the forested land, all of the forested land area is covered with heavy forests. Of the agricultural land, 78.6% is used for growing crops and 8.0% is pastures, while 1.4% is used for orchards or vine crops.

The municipality is located in the Broye district, in the Vully foothills. It consists of the village of Vallon and the hamlet of Carignan.

== Coat of arms ==
The blazon of the municipal coat of arms is Argent, on a Fess Gules three Ogresses.

== Demographics ==
Vallon has a population (as of December 2020) of 464. As of 2008, 11.7% of the population are resident foreign nationals. Over the last 10 years (2000–2010) the population has changed at a rate of 11.3%. Migration accounted for 8.8%, while births and deaths accounted for 5.6%.

Most of the population (as of 2000) speaks French (233 or 87.3%) as their first language, German is the second most common (29 or 10.9%) and Portuguese is the third (4 or 1.5%). There is 1 person who speaks Italian.

As of 2008, the population was 50.2% male and 49.8% female. The population was made up of 143 Swiss men (45.1% of the population) and 16 (5.0%) non-Swiss men. There were 133 Swiss women (42.0%) and 25 (7.9%) non-Swiss women. Of the population in the municipality, 88 or about 33.0% were born in Vallon and lived there in 2000. There were 54 or 20.2% who were born in the same canton, while 95 or 35.6% were born somewhere else in Switzerland, and 20 or 7.5% were born outside of Switzerland.

The age distribution, as of 2000, in Vallon is; 39 children or 14.6% of the population are between 0 and 9 years old and 35 teenagers or 13.1% are between 10 and 19. Of the adult population, 37 people or 13.9% of the population are between 20 and 29 years old. 41 people or 15.4% are between 30 and 39, 31 people or 11.6% are between 40 and 49, and 40 people or 15.0% are between 50 and 59. The senior population distribution is 14 people or 5.2% of the population are between 60 and 69 years old, 17 people or 6.4% are between 70 and 79, there are 11 people or 4.1% who are between 80 and 89, and there are 2 people or 0.7% who are 90 and older.

As of 2000, there were 105 people who were single and never married in the municipality. There were 128 married individuals, 16 widows or widowers and 18 individuals who are divorced.

As of 2000, there were 108 private households in the municipality, and an average of 2.4 persons per household. There were 29 households that consist of only one person and 9 households with five or more people. In 2000, a total of 104 apartments (92.9% of the total) were permanently occupied, while 7 apartments (6.3%) were seasonally occupied and one apartment was empty. As of 2009, the construction rate of new housing units was 3.2 new units per 1000 residents.

The historical population is given in the following chart:

== Heritage sites of national significance ==
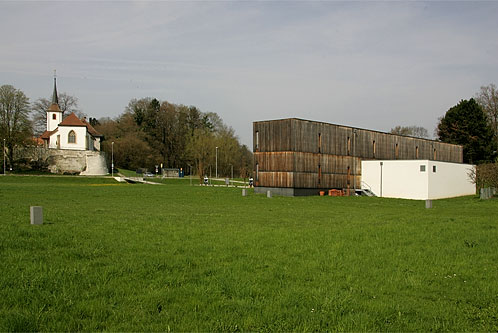
The church and the Roman museum

The Saint-Pierre Church and Sur Dompierre, Gallo-Roman Villa are listed as Swiss heritage site of national significance.

== Politics ==
In the 2011 federal election the most popular party was the SP which received 31.9% of the vote. The next three most popular parties were the SVP (19.6%), the CVP (18.3%) and the FDP (10.4%).

The SPS improved their position in Vallon rising to first, from third in 2007 (with 23.8%) The SVP lost popularity (24.9% in 2007), the CVP moved from first in 2007 (with 28.9%) to third and the FDP moved from below fourth place in 2007 to fourth. A total of 88 votes were cast in this election, of which 4 or 4.5% were invalid.

== Economy ==
As of 2010, Vallon had an unemployment rate of 2.4%. As of 2008, there were 22 people employed in the primary economic sector and about 8 businesses involved in this sector. 4 people were employed in the secondary sector and there were 3 businesses in this sector. 18 people were employed in the tertiary sector, with 6 businesses in this sector. There were 135 residents of the municipality who were employed in some capacity, of which females made up 43.0% of the workforce.

In 2008 the total number of full-time equivalent jobs was 34. The number of jobs in the primary sector was 18, all of which were in agriculture. The number of jobs in the secondary sector was 3, all of which were in manufacturing. The number of jobs in the tertiary sector was 13. In the tertiary sector; 5 or 38.5% were in wholesale or retail sales or the repair of motor vehicles, 8 or 61.5% were in education.

In 2000, there were 15 workers who commuted into the municipality and 95 workers who commuted away. The municipality is a net exporter of workers, with about 6.3 workers leaving the municipality for every one entering. Of the working population, 5.9% used public transportation to get to work, and 68.1% used a private car.

== Religion ==
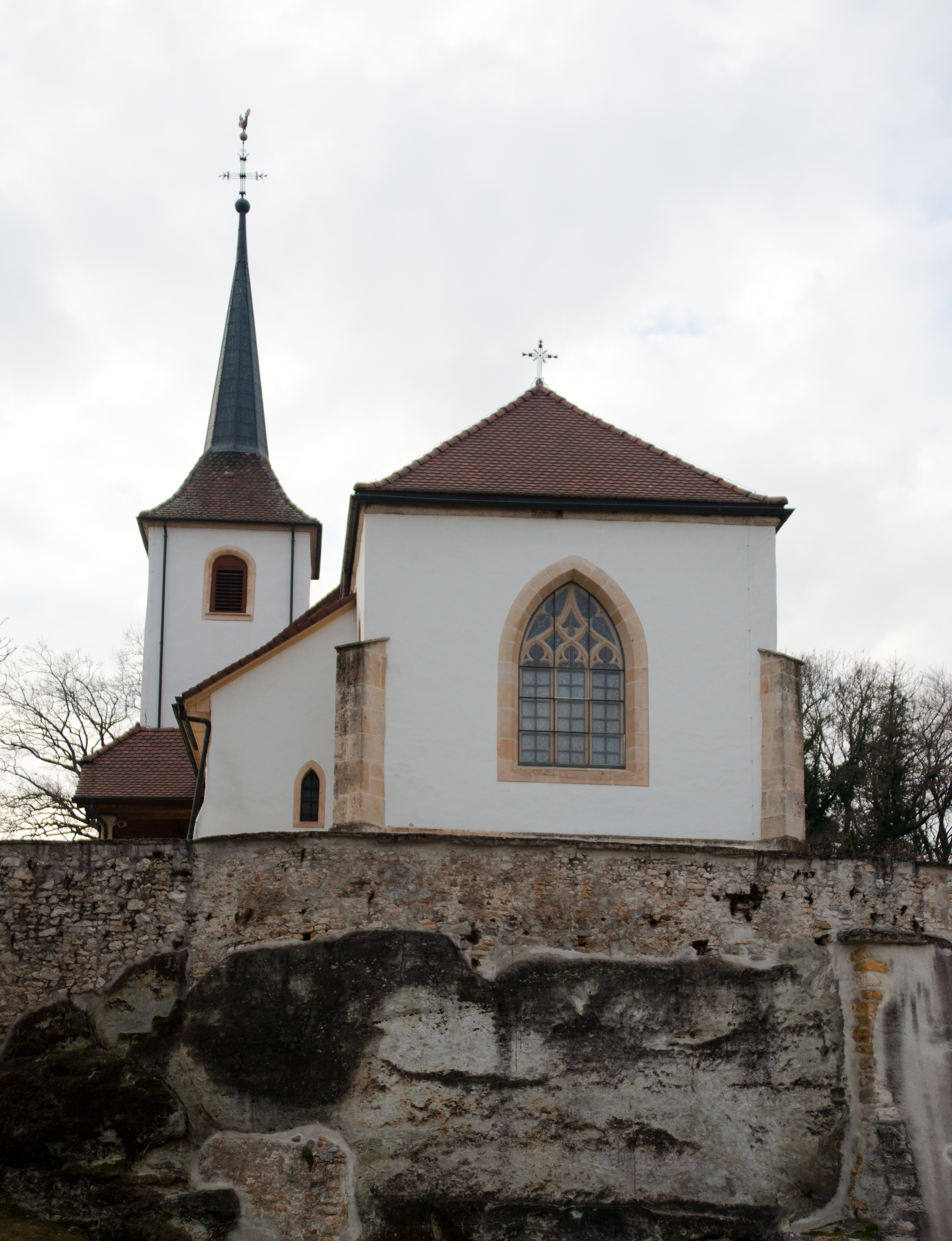
Church of Saint-Pierre

From the 2000 census, 177 or 66.3% were Roman Catholic, while 55 or 20.6% belonged to the Swiss Reformed Church. Of the rest of the population, there was 1 member of an Orthodox church, and there was 1 individual who belongs to another Christian church. 25 (or about 9.36% of the population) belonged to no church, are agnostic or atheist, and 8 individuals (or about 3.00% of the population) did not answer the question.

== Education ==
In Vallon about 97 or (36.3%) of the population have completed non-mandatory upper secondary education, and 25 or (9.4%) have completed additional higher education (either university or a Fachhochschule). Of the 25 who completed tertiary schooling, 80.0% were Swiss men, 16.0% were Swiss women.

The Canton of Fribourg school system provides one year of non-obligatory Kindergarten, followed by six years of Primary school. This is followed by three years of obligatory lower Secondary school where the students are separated according to ability and aptitude. Following the lower Secondary students may attend a three or four year optional upper Secondary school. The upper Secondary school is divided into gymnasium (university preparatory) and vocational programs. After they finish the upper Secondary program, students may choose to attend a Tertiary school or continue their apprenticeship.

During the 2010–11 school year, there were a total of 46 students attending 3 classes in Vallon. A total of 66 students from the municipality attended any school, either in the municipality or outside of it. There were 3 kindergarten classes with a total of 46 students in the municipality. The municipality had no primary school classes, but 29 students attended primary school in a neighboring municipality. During the same year, there were no lower secondary classes in the municipality, but 17 students attended lower secondary school in a neighboring municipality. There were no upper Secondary classes or vocational classes, but there were 10 upper Secondary vocational students who attended classes in another municipality. The municipality had no non-university Tertiary classes, but there was one specialized Tertiary student who attended classes in another municipality.

As of 2000, there were 22 students in Vallon who came from another municipality, while 30 residents attended schools outside the municipality.
