= Castella Castle =

Castle in Fribourg, Switzerland

- Delley-Portalban
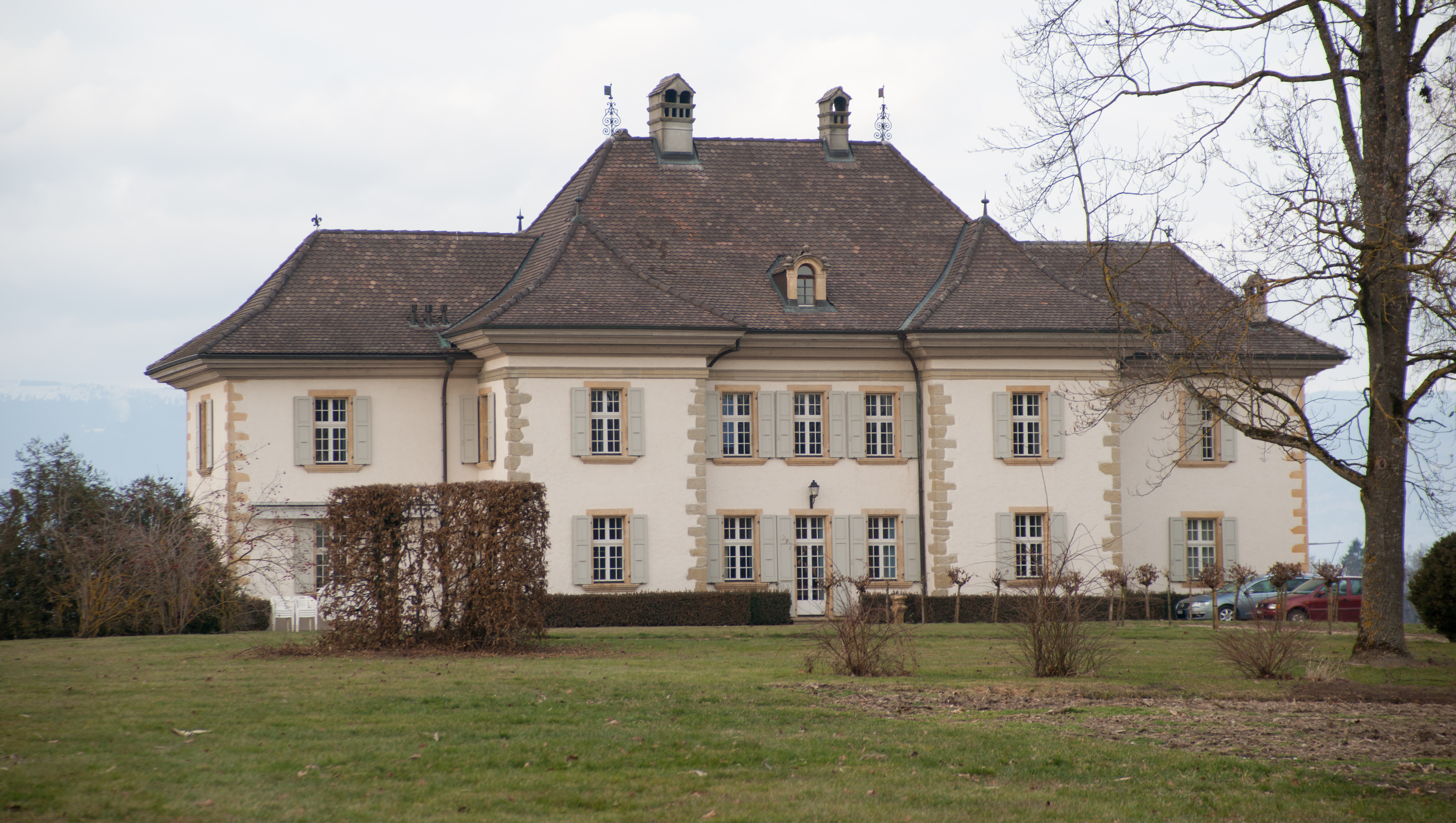
- Castella Castle

Site information
- Type: Manor house
- Code: CH-FR

Location
- Coordinates: 46°54′57″N 6°58′04″E

Castella Castle is a castle in the municipality of Delley-Portalban of the Canton of Fribourg in Switzerland. It is a Swiss heritage site of national significance.

== See also ==
- List of castles in Switzerland
- Château
