= Delley-Portalban =

- Municipality
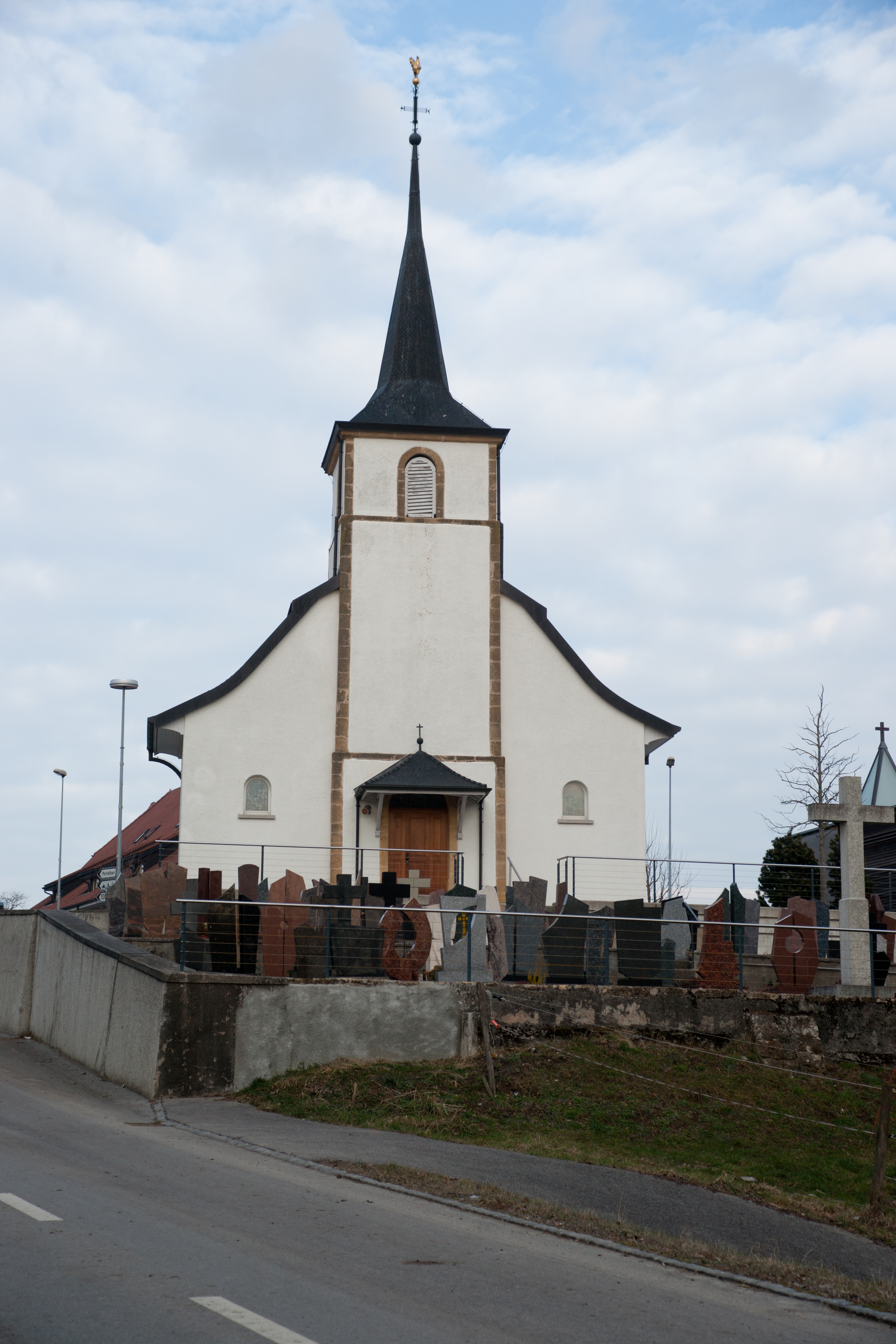
- Church in Delley-Portalban

- Flag Coat of arms
- Location of Delley-Portalban
- Location within Switzerland Location within Canton of Fribourg
- Coordinates: 46°55′N 6°58′E
- Country: Switzerland
- Canton: Fribourg
- District: Broye

Government
  - Mayor: Syndic

Area
  - Total: 7.3 km^{2} (2.8 sq mi)
- Elevation: 497 m (1,631 ft)

Population (December 2020)
  - Total: 1,222
  - Density: 170/km^{2} (430/sq mi)
- Time zone: UTC+01:00 (CET)
  - Summer (DST): UTC+02:00 (CEST)
- Postal codes: 1567 Delley; 1568 Portalban
- SFOS number: 2051
- ISO 3166 code: CH-FR
- Surrounded by: Boudry (NE), Gletterens, Neuchâtel (NE), Saint-Aubin, Vallon, Vully-les-Lacs (VD)
- Website: delley-portalban.ch

Delley-Portalban (French pronunciation: [dɛlɛ pɔʁtalbɑ̃]) is a municipality in the district of Broye, in the canton of Fribourg, Switzerland. The municipality was created on 1 January 2005 from the merger of Delley and Portalban (Arpitan: Pôrt-Alban, locally Pouraban [puʁaˈbɑ̃]).

== History ==
Delley is first mentioned in 1342 as Deler. Portalban is first mentioned in 1166 as Portubanni.

== Geography ==
Delley-Portalban has an area, as of 2009, of 7.3 square kilometers (2.8 mi^{2}). Of this area, 4.65 km^{2} (1.80 mi^{2}) or 64.0% is used for agricultural purposes, while 0.98 km^{2} (0.38 mi^{2}) or 13.5% is forested. Of the rest of the land, 0.87 km^{2} (0.34 mi^{2}) or 12.0% is settled (buildings or roads), 0.04 km^{2} (9.9 acres) or 0.6% is either rivers or lakes and 0.72 km^{2} (0.28 mi^{2}) or 9.9% is unproductive land.

Of the built up area, housing and buildings made up 7.3% and transportation infrastructure made up 2.8%. while parks, green belts and sports fields made up 1.7%. Out of the forested land, all of the forested land area is covered with heavy forests. Of the agricultural land, 58.3% is used for growing crops and 4.4% is pastures, while 1.4% is used for orchards or vine crops. All the water in the municipality is in lakes.

The municipality is located in the Broye district, directly connected to the main part of the Canton of Fribourg. It consists of the villages of Delley and Portalban and the hamlets of Grange-des-Bois, Portalban-Dessus and Moulin de Glâne.

== Demographics ==
Delley-Portalban has a population (as of December 2020) of 1,222. As of 2008, 11.0% of the population are resident foreign nationals. Over the last 10 years (2000–2010) the population has changed at a rate of 27.5%. Migration accounted for 26.3%, while births and deaths accounted for 0.7%.

Most of the population (as of 2000) speaks French (85.3%) as their first language, German is the second most common (12.2%) and Albanian is the third (1.7%).

As of 2008, the population was 52.1% male and 47.9% female. The population was made up of 406 Swiss men (47.4% of the population) and 40 (4.7%) non-Swiss men. There were 381 Swiss women (44.5%) and 29 (3.4%) non-Swiss women.

The age distribution, as of 2000, in Delley-Portalban is; 70 children or 10.5% of the population are between 0 and 9 years old and 82 teenagers or 12.3% are between 10 and 19. Of the adult population, 77 people or 11.6% of the population are between 20 and 29 years old. 87 people or 13.1% are between 30 and 39, 99 people or 14.9% are between 40 and 49, and 113 people or 17.0% are between 50 and 59. The senior population distribution is 63 people or 9.5% of the population are between 60 and 69 years old, 47 people or 7.1% are between 70 and 79, there are 25 people or 3.8% who are between 80 and 89, and there are 2 people or 0.3% who are 90 and older.

As of 2009, the construction rate of new housing units was 3.5 new units per 1000 residents.

== Heritage sites of national significance ==
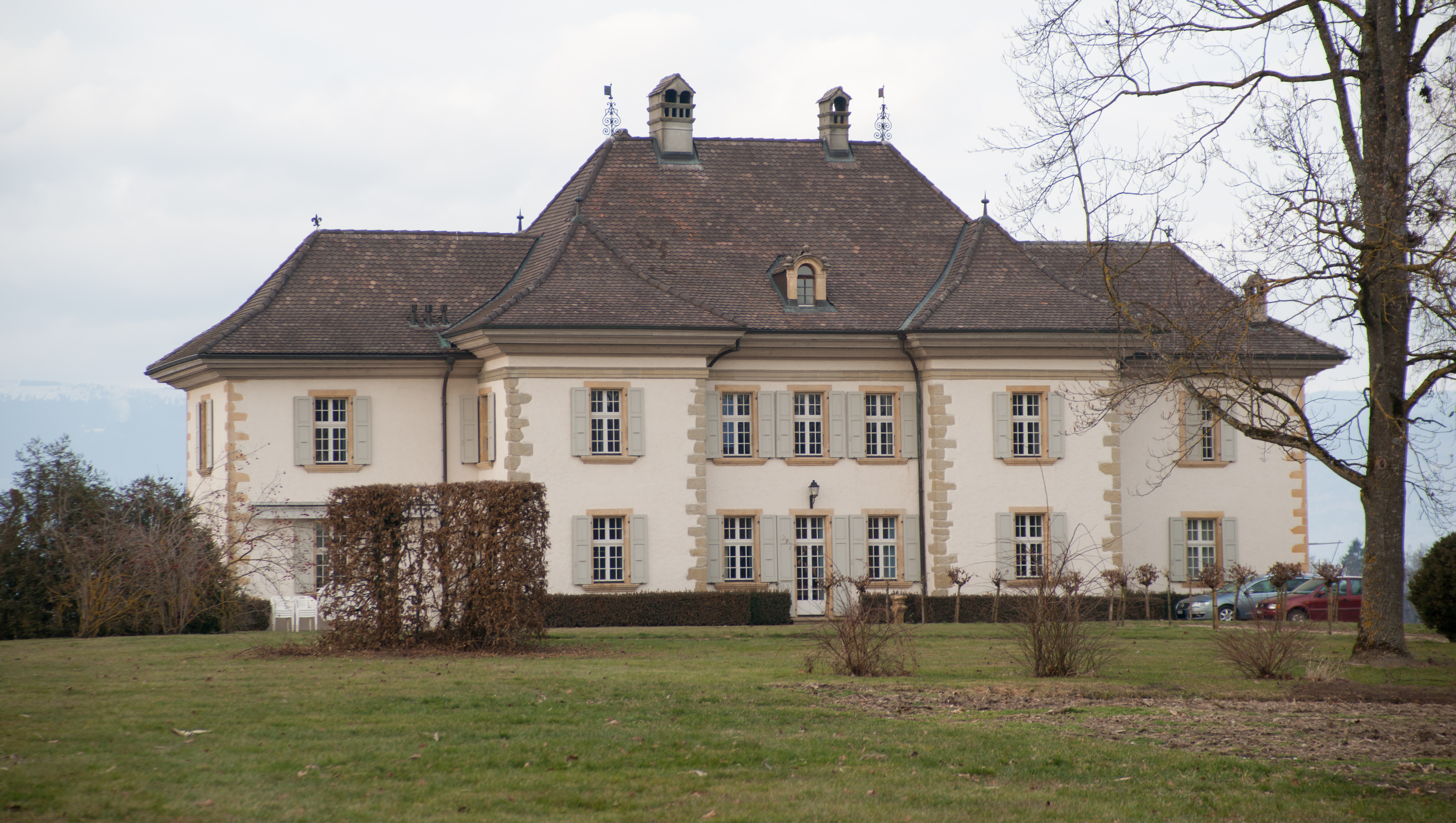
Castella Castle

The Castella Castle is listed as a Swiss heritage site of national significance.

== Politics ==
In the 2011 federal election the most popular party was the SVP which received 29.8% of the vote. The next three most popular parties were the SP (22.5%), the CVP (17.7%) and the FDP (10.4%).

The SVP received about the same percentage of the vote as they did in the 2007 Federal election (32.3% in 2007 vs 29.8% in 2011). The SPS moved from third in 2007 (with 20.2%) to second in 2011, the CVP moved from second in 2007 (with 23.5%) to third and the FDP gained popularity (13.4% in 2007). A total of 340 votes were cast in this election, of which 3 or 0.9% were invalid.

== Economy ==
As of 2010, Delley-Portalban had an unemployment rate of 3.2%. As of 2008, there were 70 people employed in the primary economic sector and about 15 businesses involved in this sector. 28 people were employed in the secondary sector and there were 10 businesses in this sector. 109 people were employed in the tertiary sector, with 26 businesses in this sector.

In 2008 the total number of full-time equivalent jobs was 159. The number of jobs in the primary sector was 43, of which 39 were in agriculture and 4 were in fishing or fisheries. The number of jobs in the secondary sector was 26 of which 6 or (23.1%) were in manufacturing and 19 (73.1%) were in construction. The number of jobs in the tertiary sector was 90. In the tertiary sector; 19 or 21.1% were in wholesale or retail sales or the repair of motor vehicles, 3 or 3.3% were in the movement and storage of goods, 37 or 41.1% were in a hotel or restaurant, 19 or 21.1% were technical professionals or scientists, 3 or 3.3% were in education.

In 2000, there were workers who commuted away from the municipality. Of the working population, 6.5% used public transportation to get to work, and 75.9% used a private car.

== Education ==
The Canton of Fribourg school system provides one year of non-obligatory Kindergarten, followed by six years of Primary school. This is followed by three years of obligatory lower Secondary school where the students are separated according to ability and aptitude. Following the lower Secondary students may attend a three or four year optional upper Secondary school. The upper Secondary school is divided into gymnasium (university preparatory) and vocational programs. After they finish the upper Secondary program, students may choose to attend a Tertiary school or continue their apprenticeship.

During the 2010–11 school year, there were a total of 60 students attending 3 classes in Delley-Portalban. A total of 91 students from the municipality attended any school, either in the municipality or outside of it. There were no kindergarten classes in the municipality, but 3 students attended kindergarten in a neighboring municipality. The municipality had 3 primary classes and 60 students. During the same year, there were no lower secondary classes in the municipality, but 28 students attended lower secondary school in a neighboring municipality. There were no upper Secondary classes or vocational classes, but there were 12 upper Secondary vocational students who attended classes in another municipality. The municipality had no non-university Tertiary classes, but there was one non-university Tertiary student and 2 specialized Tertiary students who attended classes in another municipality.
