= Neolithic in Switzerland =

Neolithic period in Switzerland from c. 6500 to 2200 BCE

The Neolithic period in Switzerland spans approximately from 6500 to 2200 BCE, marking the transition from hunter-gatherer societies to agricultural communities. This period is characterized by the introduction of farming, animal domestication, pottery production, and the development of permanent settlements, particularly the famous lake dwellings or palafittes found throughout the Swiss plateau.

The term "Neolithic" was coined by British naturalist John Lubbock in 1865, who distinguished it chronologically from the Paleolithic based on stone tool technology - the "polished stone age" versus the "chipped stone age." Modern research defines these periods according to the lifestyle of populations: while Paleolithic groups lived as nomadic hunter-gatherers, Neolithic societies developed agriculture and animal husbandry, leading to sedentarization. However, hunting, fishing, and gathering continued to provide part of their food needs, particularly during crisis periods such as poor harvests.

== Research history ==
Switzerland's lakes and marshes provide exceptional preservation conditions for archaeological remains. In the constantly humid, oxygen-free environment of lakeside settlements, not only durable materials like stone and ceramics have been preserved for millennia, but also numerous village remains and organic materials including objects and foodstuffs. After the lowering of major lake levels in the mid-19th century, wooden piles emerging from lake shores inspired Ferdinand Keller's theory of lake dwellings, which gained great success but is now outdated.

In 1857, shortly after the publication of this theory, Frédéric Troyon, based on excavations at Moosseedorf, was the first in the world to demonstrate that agriculture and animal husbandry were already practiced during this period. Thus, all the criteria that would serve to characterize the Neolithic for about a century were established: agriculture, animal husbandry, stone axes, and ceramics. Only later did excavations by British archaeologist Kathleen Kenyon at Jericho (1952-1956) lead to the distinction of a Pre-pottery Neolithic (or aceramic), with agriculture initially and then agriculture and animal husbandry as precursor phases to the Ceramic Neolithic.

The chronology of the Neolithic was refined very slowly. In 1901, for example, Jakob Heierli distinguished only three Neolithic phases, and the first two had to be reversed. It was not until Paul Vouga (1929) and Emil Vogt (from 1934) that a chronological and regional classification of present-day Swiss territory was established, still partially recognized by current research. Relative chronology today relies mainly on stratigraphic results from excavations at Delley-Portalban (1962-1979), Twann (1974-1976), and Zurich - Kleiner Hafner (1981-1984), as well as on dendrochronology data.

== Chronology and regional subdivisions ==
Archaeological sites and objects from the Neolithic are distributed extremely unevenly chronologically and geographically across present-day Swiss territory. The occupation of the Swiss plateau from 4300 to 2400 BCE is well attested by numerous lakeside settlements; despite several more or less long interruptions, this region is thus one of the richest in Europe in Neolithic remains. Terrestrial habitats, much less well preserved in dry soils, have also disappeared due to destruction by later exploitation and occupation.

The remains are much rarer for periods that preceded and followed the pile-dwelling sites. This gap is particularly marked for the period from 6500 to 4300 BCE, and when some elements remain, they can generally only be interpreted by comparison with objects discovered abroad. The situation is somewhat more favorable for the period from 2400 to 2200 BCE.

=== Pre-pottery Neolithic (6500-5400 BCE) ===
The Pre-pottery Neolithic or Late Mesolithic is characterized by the appearance of cereal cultivation, whose presence can only be detected through pollen analysis. A flax seed from Wallisellen - Langachermoos dating to about 6500 BCE attests that plants were cultivated, as flax is not an indigenous species in Central Europe. The rare quality objects discovered are archaeologically related to the Late Mesolithic; the most explicit come from the Schötz 7 station at the edge of Wauwilermoos.

Trapezoidal microliths and antler harpoons, such as those found at Schötz 7 or Arconciel - La Souche, are characteristic of the period. From the latter site also comes a decorated fired clay stamp (called pintadera) dating to about 6100 BCE, which testifies to exchanges with the Balkan area.

=== Early Ceramic Neolithic (5400-4300 BCE) ===
The oldest complexes containing ceramics date to 5400 BCE. At the same time, we also find the typical asymmetric flint arrowheads with lateral retouch mentioned above, such as specimens from Arconciel - La Souche (layer 1, around 5100 BCE). Comparison with foreign sites, where objects from this period benefited from better preservation conditions, has made it possible to attribute the rare ceramic fragments discovered in Switzerland to European cultural assemblages based on their forms and decorations.

While flints show no regional divergences, ceramic objects differ stylistically between southern, western, and northeastern Switzerland. Southern Switzerland, with ceramics of the Neolitico inferiore padano-alpino and Vasi a bocca quadrata styles, was oriented toward the Po Valley; western Switzerland, with sherds of La Hoguette style and later, in the far southwest, Saint-Uze type, was directed toward France; northeastern Switzerland, with vessels from Linear Pottery culture, Hinkelstein, Grossgartach, and Rössen cultures, was oriented toward Central Europe.

=== Middle Ceramic Neolithic (4300-2400 BCE) ===
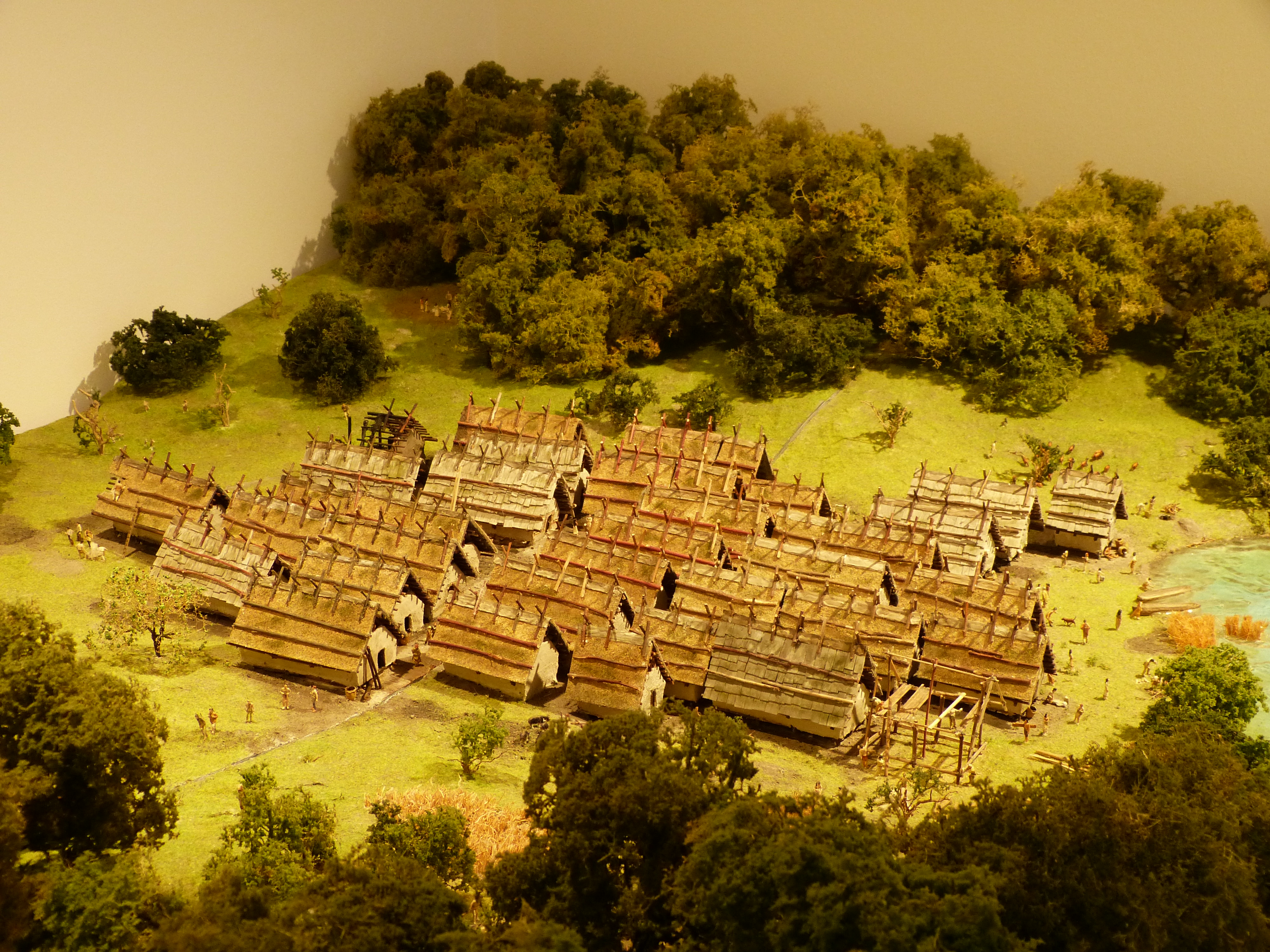
Pfyn culture settlement at Breitenloo, c. 3700 BC

Numerous lakeside settlements dating from 4300 to 2400 BCE were excavated in the lakes of the Swiss plateau. The large quantities of well-preserved material with absolute dating allow observation of typo-chronological evolution and regional differences, particularly regarding ceramics.

For the period around 4300 BCE, however, only a few well-dated large assemblages were uncovered in western Switzerland. The ceramics, attributed to Middle Neolithic I, are characterized by jars with straight walls and round bottoms, with opposed ribbon handles between which knobs are sometimes placed, as well as by carinated bowls. Similar vessels are found in the Saint-Uze style (eastern France).

In the central plateau, ceramics of the Egolzwil culture are found at the same time, characterized by round-bottomed, ovoid jars with opposed gripping means, as well as round-bottomed bottles with short funnel necks and loop handles along the body. From 4200/4100 BCE onward, greater diversity of forms and modifications in decoration are observed in the plateau.

=== Final Ceramic Neolithic (2400-2200 BCE) ===
For the Final Neolithic, the quality of finds decreases again and there are hardly any preserved wooden objects. Without recourse to dendrochronology, interpretation suffers from the relative imprecision of carbon-14 dating. The period from 2400 to 2200 BCE is that of the Bell Beaker culture, represented throughout Switzerland except in the Grisons.

As evidenced by all absolute dates, this culture occupies a precise chronological phase in Switzerland between corded ware and the Early Bronze Age. Stratigraphic observations at Wädenswil - Vorder Au showed that the first Bell Beaker vessels in Switzerland (around 2425 BCE) are found in the final phase of corded ware. The Bell Beaker culture thus continues this tradition.

== Climate and environment ==
The paleoenvironment can be reconstructed notably by measuring the ratio between stable isotopes 16 and 18 of oxygen (δ18O). Climate history is best read in ice cores drilled in Greenland where 18O values and δ18O curves are established whose oscillations correspond to temperature variations.

The δ18O curve from a North Greenland Ice Core Project (NGRIP) ice sample reveals that sudden warming occurred at the beginning of the Preboreal (around 9600 BCE), marking the beginning of the post-glacial period (Holocene). Except for a significant drop in the Pre-pottery Neolithic (around 6250 BCE), temperatures varied little thereafter. During the Holocene, fluctuations remained modest.

Sediment samples taken from lakes were used to create pollen profiles that allowed reconstruction of vegetation over several millennia. The pollen diagram from Buttisholz - Soppensee shows a strong increase in hazelnuts during the Boreal, around 9000 BCE, and the almost simultaneous appearance of mixed forests with oaks. This concentration of hazelnut pollen indicates the existence of sparse forest comprising a great variety of ground plants, which offered ideal conditions for gathering and hunting.

== Habitat and architecture ==
Currently, 22 four-aisled long houses of the Linear Pottery culture dating to before 5000 BCE are known, a large Middle Neolithic building at Gächlingen - Goldäcker, as well as a two-aisled house of the Neolitico inferiore padano-alpino at Bellinzona - Castel Grande, whose plans are readable from the coloration left in the soil by posts, digging pits, and small ditches.

The long houses with wattle and daub walls, characteristic of the Linear Pottery culture, could have had a lifespan of several decades. The oldest known village-type habitat, that of Gächlingen - Goldäcker, dates back to this culture and was built on fertile loess soils.

Lakeside settlements, which appeared from 4300 BCE onward, are particularly well documented. Wood dated to the exact year provides information on house architecture and allows reconstruction of the history of entire villages, even though, apart from the framework posts driven into the ground, only fragments of floors, walls, and roofs are observable.

The pile dwellings were sometimes located a few kilometers apart on the shore, within sight of each other. In addition to the village proper, their territory probably included part of the lake and hinterland, which played a central role in supply (hunting, fishing, gathering, wood, livestock, and agriculture). Houses were regularly repaired using freshly cut wood. With few exceptions, the interior space was divided into two aisles. Walls made of wattle between framework posts were coated with clay and roofs covered with wooden shingles or reeds.

== Economy and daily life ==
The transition from hunting and gathering economy to food production economy was first accomplished in the Near East; the knowledge developed there then spread to Europe and Switzerland. Agriculture appeared on present-day Swiss territory from about 6500 BCE, prior to animal husbandry and ceramics. Seeds and animals must have been imported, as cultivated plant species like cereals, flax, peas and lentils, and several domestic animal species (goats, sheep) are not found in the indigenous fauna and flora of Central Europe.

Agriculture and animal husbandry represent a profound change in lifestyle compared to predation, but the slowness of the process probably made it barely perceptible to prehistoric men and women. Pollen analysis and study of plant macroremains show that agricultural intensification progressed very slowly. The first domestic animals known date also to the Early Ceramic Neolithic around 4800 BCE; poor preservation of Pre-pottery Neolithic remains does not allow attestation of their presence at the end of this period.

Tools such as hoes made from deer antlers or wood were used for field work. Other signs of agricultural intensification, draft animals as well as technological innovations such as the yoke and plow also appeared around 3200 BCE. Grinding cereals with hand querns on dormant millstones is only observed from the Ceramic Neolithic onward.

== Burials and funerary customs ==
Compared to more recent periods, Neolithic burials are rare and grave goods (ornaments, daily objects such as flint arrowheads, stone or bone artifacts, vessels) unspectacular. Inhumation tombs predominate and cremations (under tumuli) are sporadic; it is possible that other funerary rites were practiced, but they are not currently attested by archaeology.

The link between habitat corresponding to burials has generally not been established. Only cist tombs from the 5th and 4th millennia BCE are found in some quantity in western Switzerland, Valais, and central Switzerland. The deceased were buried in flexed position. In Valais, tombs around 4500 BCE contained only one individual; later, there were sometimes several.

In the Lake Geneva region, there could be up to seven individuals per tomb, at Lenzburg up to 17, and even about thirty in the dolmen of Oberbipp. In the 3rd millennium BCE, dolmens measuring about 2 × 3 m appeared, housing 47 burials (Aesch), or even about ninety (Sion - Le Petit-Chasseur 3).

== Neolithic society ==
The Neolithic covers a period of more than 4000 years during which an evolution of social structures must be admitted. The human groups who first began cultivating cereals in Switzerland around 6500 BCE probably still lived according to the model of Mesolithic hunter-gatherers, with consequently an egalitarian social structure very weakly dominated by a male alpha individual.

Comparison with ethnological examples allows reconstruction of small territorial groups of 50 to 100 individuals. Very gradually, ranked society evolved to become a stratified society, once agriculture and animal husbandry allowed accumulation of reserves and goods. This evolution was probably accentuated by the appearance and possession or trade of copper around 4000 BCE.

Two indicators dating to about 4300 BCE confirm attempts by individuals or small groups to acquire more authority and institutionalized competencies. First at Lenzburg, the largest cist tomb in the necropolis, the only one with a slab bottom, contained a single male individual, who was also the tallest and was accompanied by the largest number of grave goods. Second, the perforated axe from Cham - Eslen, mounted on an oversized handle wrapped in birch bark decorated with motifs, can be considered a mark of social prestige.

== See also ==
- Early history of Switzerland
- European neolithic
- Prehistoric pile dwellings around the Alps

== Bibliography ==
- Heierli, Jakob: Urgeschichte der Schweiz, 1901.
- Vouga, Paul: «Classification du néolithique lacustre suisse», in: Indicateur d'antiquités suisses, nouvelle série, 31/2, 1929, pp. 81-91.
- Vouga, Paul: «Classification du néolithique lacustre suisse», in: Indicateur d'antiquités suisses, nouvelle série, 31/3, 1929, pp. 161-180.
- Vogt, Emil: Pfahlbaustudien, 1954.
- Vogt, Emil: «Der Stand der neolithischen Forschung in der Schweiz», in: Annuaire de la Société suisse de préhistoire, 51, 1964, pp. 7-27. Arnold, Béat: Pirogues monoxyles d'Europe centrale. Construction, typologie, évolution, 2 vol., 1995-1996.
- Société suisse de préhistoire et d'archéologie (éd.): La Suisse du Paléolithique à l'aube du Moyen-Age. De l'homme de Néandertal à Charlemagne, vol. 2, 1995. Erny-Rodmann, Christiane; Gross-Klee, Eduard et al.: «Früher "human impact" und Ackerbau im Übergangsbereich Spätmesolithikum-Frühneolithikum im schweizerischen Mittelland», in: Annuaire de la Société suisse de préhistoire et d'archéologie, 80, 1997, pp. 27-56.
- Othenin-Girard, Blaise: Le Campaniforme d'Alle, Noir Bois (Jura, Suisse), 1997.
- Wyss, René: Das neolithische Hockergräberfeld von Lenzburg, Kt. Aargau, 1998.
- Bleuer, Elisabeth; Huber, Hermann et al.: «Das endneolithische Kollektivgrab von Spreitenbach im Kanton Aargau», in: Archéologie suisse, 22/3, 1999, pp. 114-122.
- Eberschweiler, Beat: «Die jüngsten endneolithischen Ufersiedlungen am Zürichsee», in: Annuaire de la Société suisse de préhistoire et d'archéologie, 82, 1999, pp. 39-64.
- Hafner, Albert; Suter, Peter J.: -3400. Die Entwicklung der Bauerngesellschaften im 4. Jahrtausend v.Chr. am Bielersee aufgrund der Rettungsgrabungen von Nidau und Sutz-Lattrigen, 2000. Leuzinger, Urs: Die jungsteinzeitliche Seeufersiedlung Arbon / Bleiche 3. Befunde, 2000.
- Honegger, Matthieu: L'industrie lithique taillée du néolithique moyen et final de Suisse, 2001.
- Affolter, Jehanne: Provenance des silex préhistoriques du Jura et des régions limitrophes, 2 vol., 2002.
- Capitani, Annick de; Deschler-Erb, Sabine et al: Die jungsteinzeitliche Seeufersiedlung Arbon / Bleiche 3. Funde, 2002.
- Michel, Robert: Typologie et chronologie de la céramique néolithique. Céramostratigraphie d'un habitat lacustre, 2 vol., 2002.
- Jacomet, Stefanie; Leuzinger, Urs; Schibler, Jörg: Die jungsteinzeitliche Seeufersiedlung Arbon / Bleiche 3. Umwelt und Wirtschaft, 2004.
- Hügi, Ursula: «Stansstad NW-Kehrsiten. Neolithische Seeufersiedlungen am Alpennordrand», in: Annuaire d'archéologie suisse, 89, 2006, pp. 7-23. Altorfer, Kurt; Höneisen, Markus: «Neues zur frühen bäuerlichen Besiedlung am Hochrhein», in: Helvetia archaeologica, 38, 2007, pp. 2-12. Burri, Elena: La céramique du Néolithique moyen. Analyse spatiale et histoire des peuplements, 2007.
- Mauvilly, Michel; Jeunesse, Christian; Doppler, Thomas: «Ein Tonstempel aus der spätneolithischen Fundstelle von Arconciel/La Souche (Kanton Freiburg, Schweiz)», in: Quartär, 55, 2008, pp. 151-157.
- Stöckli, Werner E.: Chronologie und Regionalität des jüngeren Neolithikums (4300-2400 v.Chr.) im Schweizer Mittelland, in Süddeutschland und in Ostfrankreich aufgrund der Keramik und der absoluten Datierungen, ausgehend von den Forschungen in den Feuchtbodensiedlungen der Schweiz, 2009.
- Denaire, Anthony; Doppler, Thomas et al.: «Espaces culturels, frontières et interactions au 5ème millénaire entre la plaine du Rhin supérieur et les rivages de la Méditerranée», in: Annuaire d'archéologie suisse, 94, 2011, pp. 21-59.
- Hafner, Albert: Schnidejoch et Lötschenpass. Investigations archéologiques dans les Alpes bernoises, vol. 2, 2015.
- Stapfer, Regine; Hafner, Albert; Heitz, Caroline: «Frischer Fang aus dem See. Mobilität und Beziehungsnetze im Fokus», in: as. Archéologie suisse, 39/2, 2016, pp. 21-30. Stöckli, Werner E.: Urgeschichte der Schweiz im Überblick (15'000 v.Chr.-Christi Geburt). Die Konstruktion einer Urgeschichte, 2016.
- Heitz, Caroline; Stapfer, Regine (éd.): Mobility and Pottery Production. Archaeological & Anthropological Perspectives, 2017.
- Altorfer, Kurt; Hartmann, Chantal: Frühe Bauern im Klettgau. Der alt- und mittelneolithische Siedlungsplatz Gächlingen-Goldäcker, 2018.
- Huber, Adrian; Kienholz, Anna: Otelfingen-Harbernbach. Eine jungsteinzeitliche Siedlung des 38. Jh. v.Chr. am Lägernsüdfuss, 2021.
- Heitz, Caroline: Keramik jenseits von «Kulturen». Mobilität, Verflechtungen und Transformationen im nördlichen Alpenvorland (3950-3800 v.Chr.), 2023.
