= Saint-Aubin, Fribourg =

Saint-Aubin
- Municipality
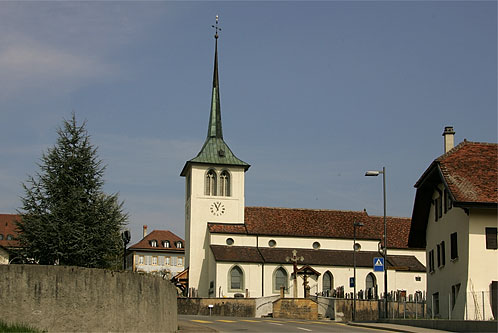
- Saint-Aubin village church

- Coat of arms
- Location of Saint-Aubin
- Location within Switzerland Location within Canton of Fribourg
- Coordinates: 46°53′N 6°59′E
- Country: Switzerland
- Canton: Fribourg
- District: Broye

Government
  - Mayor: Syndic

Area
  - Total: 7.90 km^{2} (3.05 sq mi)
- Elevation: 471 m (1,545 ft)

Population (December 2020)
  - Total: 1,886
  - Density: 239/km^{2} (618/sq mi)
- Time zone: UTC+01:00 (CET)
  - Summer (DST): UTC+02:00 (CEST)
- Postal code: 1566
- SFOS number: 2041
- ISO 3166 code: CH-FR
- Surrounded by: Avenches (VD), Delley-Portalban, Domdidier, Missy (VD), Vallon, Villars-le-Grand (VD)
- Website: st-aubin.ch

Saint-Aubin (French: [sɛ̃t‿obɛ̃]; Arpitan: Sent-Arbin [ʃɛ̃t oˈbɛ̃]) is a municipality in the district of Broye in the canton of Fribourg in Switzerland. On 1 January 1991 the former municipality of Les Friques merged into Saint-Aubin.

== History ==
Saint-Aubin is first mentioned in 1056 as Sancti Albini. The municipality was formerly known by its German name St Albin, however, that name is no longer used.

== Geography ==
Saint-Aubin has an area, as of 2009, of 7.9 square kilometers (3.1 mi^{2}). Of this area, 6.42 km^{2} (2.48 mi^{2}) or 81.5% is used for agricultural purposes, while 0.51 km^{2} (0.20 mi^{2}) or 6.5% is forested. Of the rest of the land, 0.82 km^{2} (0.32 mi^{2}) or 10.4% is settled (buildings or roads), 0.15 km^{2} (37 acres) or 1.9% is either rivers or lakes.

Of the built-up area, housing and buildings made up 5.1% and transportation infrastructure made up 3.8%. Out of the forested land, 4.8% of the total land area is heavily forested and 1.6% is covered with orchards or small clusters of trees. Of the agricultural land, 68.9% is used for growing crops and 9.9% is pastures, while 2.7% is used for orchards or vine crops. All the water in the municipality is flowing water.

The municipality is located in the Broye district.

== Coat of arms ==
The blazon of the municipal coat of arms is Or, a Bulrush eradicated Vert fructed Sable.

== Demographics ==
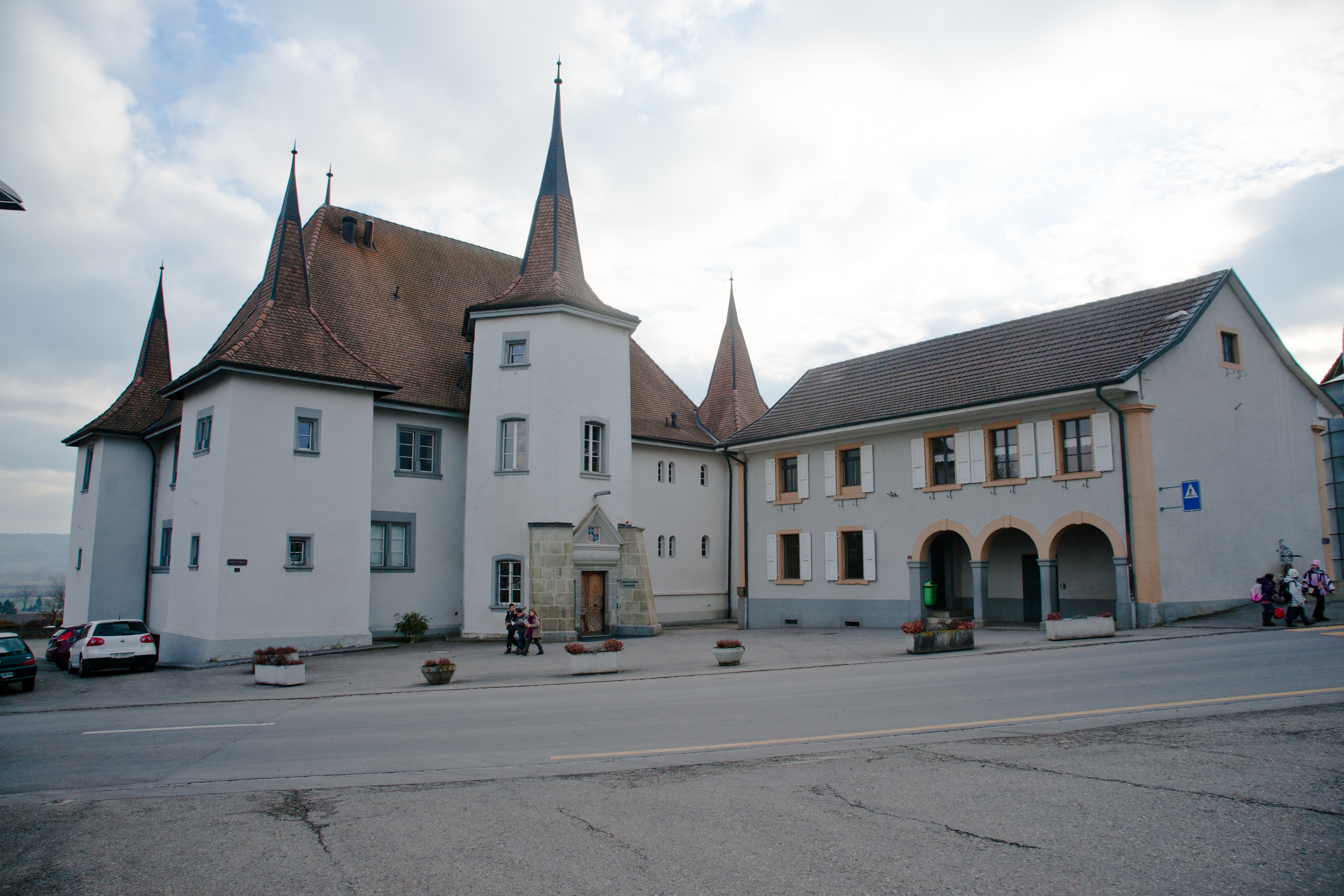
Town hall of Saint-Aubin

Saint-Aubin has a population (as of December 2020) of 1,886. As of 2008, 14.6% of the population are resident foreign nationals. Over the last 10 years (2000–2010) the population has changed at a rate of 11%. Migration accounted for 7.1%, while births and deaths accounted for 4.9%.

Most of the population (as of 2000) speaks French (1,102 or 88.9%) as their first language, German is the second most common (75 or 6.1%) and Albanian is the third (19 or 1.5%). There are 7 people who speak Italian.

As of 2008, the population was 50.0% male and 50.0% female. The population was made up of 582 Swiss men (42.1% of the population) and 109 (7.9%) non-Swiss men. There were 592 Swiss women (42.8%) and 99 (7.2%) non-Swiss women.

Of the population in the municipality, 481 or about 38.8% were born in Saint-Aubin and lived there in 2000. There were 280 or 22.6% who were born in the same canton, while 279 or 22.5% were born somewhere else in Switzerland, and 162 or 13.1% were born outside of Switzerland. The age distribution, as of 2000, in Saint-Aubin is; 193 children or 15.6% of the population are between 0 and 9 years old and 167 teenagers or 13.5% are between 10 and 19. Of the adult population, 146 people or 11.8% of the population are between 20 and 29 years old. 209 people or 16.9% are between 30 and 39, 161 people or 13.0% are between 40 and 49, and 177 people or 14.3% are between 50 and 59. The senior population distribution is 90 people or 7.3% of the population are between 60 and 69 years old, 66 people or 5.3% are between 70 and 79, there are 25 people or 2.0% who are between 80 and 89, and there are 5 people or 0.4% who are 90 and older.

As of 2000, there were 518 people who were single and never married in the municipality. There were 631 married individuals, 57 widows or widowers and 33 individuals who are divorced.

As of 2000, there were 442 private households in the municipality, and an average of 2.8 persons per household. There were 101 households that consist of only one person and 56 households with five or more people. In 2000, a total of 433 apartments (86.4% of the total) were permanently occupied, while 49 apartments (9.8%) were seasonally occupied and 19 apartments (3.8%) were empty. As of 2009, the construction rate of new housing units was 4.3 new units per 1000 residents. The vacancy rate for the municipality, in 2010, was 0.7%.

The historical population is given in the following chart:

== Politics ==
In the 2011 federal election the most popular party was the CVP which received 29.2% of the vote. The next three most popular parties were the SP (22.6%), the FDP (18.0%) and the SVP (17.8%).

The CVP received about the same percentage of the vote as they did in the 2007 Federal election (33.9% in 2007 vs 29.2% in 2011). The SPS moved from third in 2007 (with 20.0%) to second in 2011, the FDP moved from fourth in 2007 (with 18.8%) to third and the SVP moved from second in 2007 (with 20.5%) to fourth. A total of 456 votes were cast in this election, of which 3 or 0.7% were invalid.

== Economy ==
As of 2010, Saint-Aubin had an unemployment rate of 2.3%. As of 2008, there were 62 people employed in the primary economic sector and about 23 businesses involved in this sector. 139 people were employed in the secondary sector and there were 18 businesses in this sector. 213 people were employed in the tertiary sector, with 32 businesses in this sector. There were 634 residents of the municipality who were employed in some capacity, of which females made up 42.4% of the workforce.

In 2008 the total number of full-time equivalent jobs was 351. The number of jobs in the primary sector was 43, all of which were in agriculture. The number of jobs in the secondary sector was 131 of which 49 or (37.4%) were in manufacturing and 83 (63.4%) were in construction. The number of jobs in the tertiary sector was 177. In the tertiary sector; 25 or 14.1% were in wholesale or retail sales or the repair of motor vehicles, 8 or 4.5% were in the movement and storage of goods, 7 or 4.0% were in a hotel or restaurant, 113 or 63.8% were technical professionals or scientists, 9 or 5.1% were in education and 9 or 5.1% were in health care.

In 2000, there were 143 workers who commuted into the municipality and 457 workers who commuted away. The municipality is a net exporter of workers, with about 3.2 workers leaving the municipality for every one entering. Of the working population, 3.5% used public transportation to get to work, and 76.3% used a private car.

== Religion ==
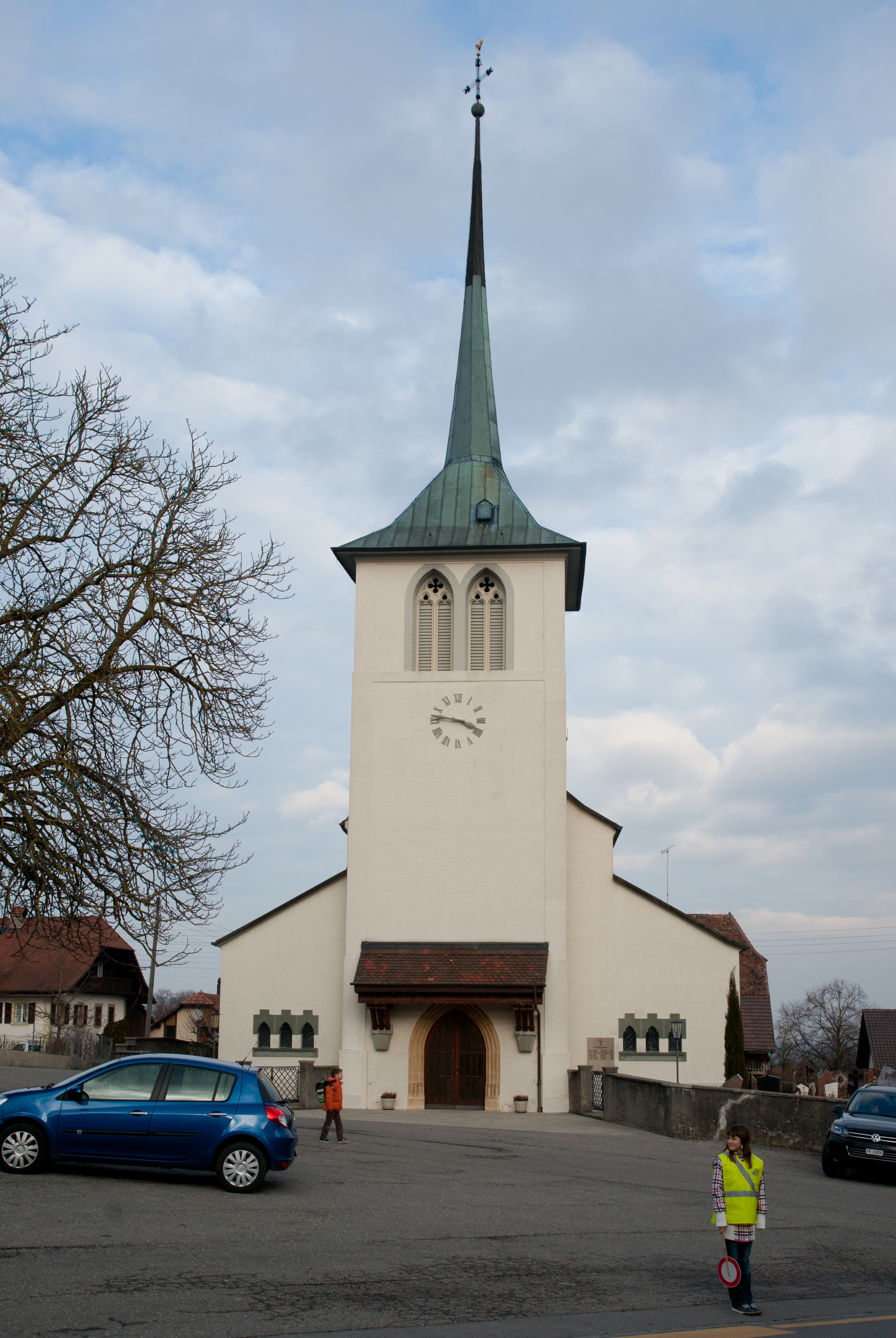
Saint-Aubin church

From the 2000 census, 826 or 66.7% were Roman Catholic, while 184 or 14.9% belonged to the Swiss Reformed Church. Of the rest of the population, there were 6 members of an Orthodox church (or about 0.48% of the population), and there were 5 individuals (or about 0.40% of the population) who belonged to another Christian church. There were 69 (or about 5.57% of the population) who were Muslim. There were 4 individuals who were Buddhist and 2 individuals who belonged to another church. 86 (or about 6.94% of the population) belonged to no church, are agnostic or atheist, and 59 individuals (or about 4.76% of the population) did not answer the question.

== Education ==
In Saint-Aubin about 417 or (33.7%) of the population have completed non-mandatory upper secondary education, and 115 or (9.3%) have completed additional higher education (either university or a Fachhochschule). Of the 115 who completed tertiary schooling, 71.3% were Swiss men, 26.1% were Swiss women.

The Canton of Fribourg school system provides one year of non-obligatory Kindergarten, followed by six years of Primary school. This is followed by three years of obligatory lower Secondary school where the students are separated according to ability and aptitude. Following the lower Secondary students may attend a three or four year optional upper Secondary school. The upper Secondary school is divided into gymnasium (university preparatory) and vocational programs. After they finish the upper Secondary program, students may choose to attend a Tertiary school or continue their apprenticeship.

During the 2010–11 school year, there were a total of 136 students attending 7 classes in Saint-Aubin. A total of 253 students from the municipality attended any school, either in the municipality or outside of it. There were no kindergarten classes in the municipality, but 37 students attended kindergarten in a neighboring municipality. The municipality had 7 primary classes and 136 students. During the same year, there were no lower secondary classes in the municipality, but 60 students attended lower secondary school in a neighboring municipality. There were no upper Secondary classes or vocational classes, but there were 2 upper Secondary students and 39 upper Secondary vocational students who attended classes in another municipality. The municipality had no non-university Tertiary classes, but there were 6 non-university Tertiary students and 2 specialized Tertiary students who attended classes in another municipality.

As of 2000, there were 14 students in Saint-Aubin who came from another municipality, while 99 residents attended schools outside the municipality.
