= Ménières =

- Municipality
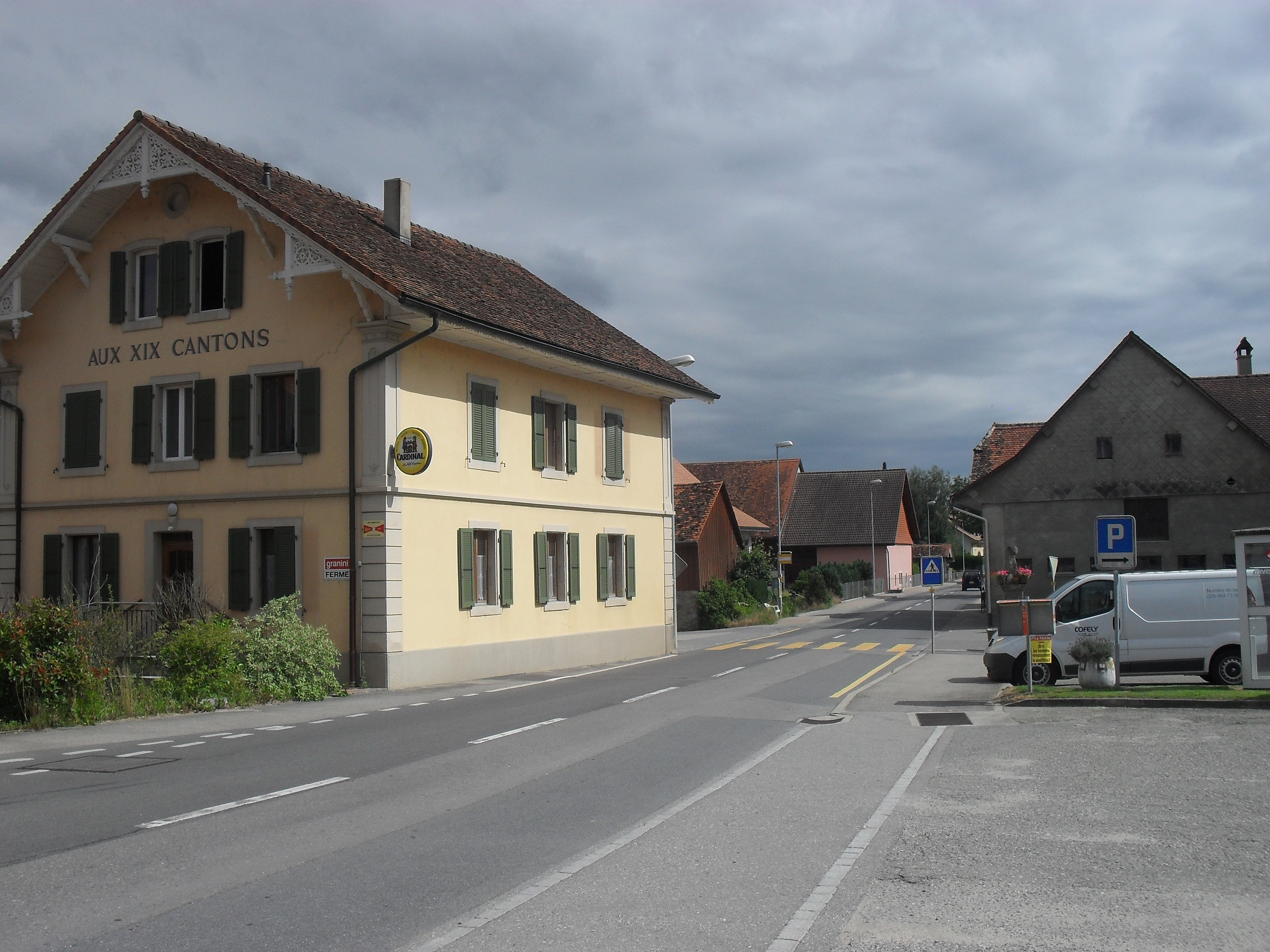

- Flag Coat of arms
- Location of Ménières
- Location within Switzerland Location within Canton of Fribourg
- Coordinates: 46°47′N 6°53′E
- Country: Switzerland
- Canton: Fribourg
- District: Broye

Government
  - Mayor: Syndic

Area
  - Total: 4.4 km^{2} (1.7 sq mi)
- Elevation: 503 m (1,650 ft)

Population (December 2020)
  - Total: 427
  - Density: 97/km^{2} (250/sq mi)
- Time zone: UTC+01:00 (CET)
  - Summer (DST): UTC+02:00 (CEST)
- Postal code: 1533
- SFOS number: 2027
- ISO 3166 code: CH-FR
- Surrounded by: Cugy, Granges-près-Marnand (VD), Les Montets, Sassel (VD)
- Website: menieres.ch

Ménières (French: [menjɛʁ]; Arpitan: Meniéres, locally Menyire [məˈɲiʁ(ə)]) is a former municipality in the district of Broye, in the canton of Fribourg, Switzerland. On 1 January 2026 the former municipalities of Fétigny and Ménières merged into the municipality of Fétigny-Ménières.

== History ==
Ménières is first mentioned in 1228 as hospitale de Meinires.

== Geography ==
Ménières has an area, as of 2009, of 4.4 square kilometers (1.7 mi^{2}). Of this area, 3.27 km^{2} (1.26 mi^{2}) or 74.7% is used for agricultural purposes, while 0.68 km^{2} (0.26 mi^{2}) or 15.5% is forested. Of the rest of the land, 0.4 km^{2} (0.15 mi^{2}) or 9.1% is settled (buildings or roads).

Of the built up area, housing and buildings made up 3.0% and transportation infrastructure made up 2.1%. Power and water infrastructure as well as other special developed areas made up 4.1% of the area Out of the forested land, all of the forested land area is covered with heavy forests. Of the agricultural land, 64.4% is used for growing crops and 8.7% is pastures, while 1.6% is used for orchards or vine crops.

The municipality is located in the Broye district, in the Estavayer-le-Lac exclave.

== Coat of arms ==
The blazon of the municipal coat of arms is Gules, a Boar salient Or armed Argent in chief sinister a Mullet of the last pierced.

== Demographics ==
Ménières has a population (as of December 2020) of 427. As of 2008, 7.2% of the population are resident foreign nationals. Over the last 10 years (2000–2010) the population has changed at a rate of 29.1%. Migration accounted for 16.7%, while births and deaths accounted for 9.6%.

Most of the population (as of 2000) speaks French (280 or 94.3%) as their first language, German is the second most common (14 or 4.7%) and Italian is the third (1 or 0.3%).

As of 2008, the population was 52.0% male and 48.0% female. The population was made up of 155 Swiss men (46.8% of the population) and 17 (5.1%) non-Swiss men. There were 147 Swiss women (44.4%) and 12 (3.6%) non-Swiss women. Of the population in the municipality, 134 or about 45.1% were born in Ménières and lived there in 2000. There were 73 or 24.6% who were born in the same canton, while 69 or 23.2% were born somewhere else in Switzerland, and 16 or 5.4% were born outside of Switzerland.

The age distribution, as of 2000, in Ménières is; 42 children or 14.1% of the population are between 0 and 9 years old and 38 teenagers or 12.8% are between 10 and 19. Of the adult population, 40 people or 13.5% of the population are between 20 and 29 years old. 54 people or 18.2% are between 30 and 39, 36 people or 12.1% are between 40 and 49, and 33 people or 11.1% are between 50 and 59. The senior population distribution is 22 people or 7.4% of the population are between 60 and 69 years old, 22 people or 7.4% are between 70 and 79, there are 9 people or 3.0% who are between 80 and 89, and there is 1 person who is 90 and older.

As of 2000, there were 128 people who were single and never married in the municipality. There were 144 married individuals, 14 widows or widowers and 11 individuals who are divorced.

As of 2000, there were 107 private households in the municipality, and an average of 2.6 persons per household. There were 29 households that consist of only one person and 9 households with five or more people. In 2000, a total of 105 apartments (85.4% of the total) were permanently occupied, while 10 apartments (8.1%) were seasonally occupied and 8 apartments (6.5%) were empty. As of 2009, the construction rate of new housing units was 6.2 new units per 1000 residents.

The historical population is given in the following chart:

== Politics ==
In the 2011 federal election the most popular party was the SVP which received 41.1% of the vote. The next three most popular parties were the CVP (18.5%), the SP (17.7%) and the FDP (11.2%).

The SVP gained an additional 5.2% of the vote from the 2007 Federal election (35.8% in 2007 vs 41.1% in 2011). The CVP lost popularity (25.0% in 2007), the SPS retained about the same popularity (17.5% in 2007) and the FDP lost popularity (16.7% in 2007). A total of 97 votes were cast in this election, of which 2 or 2.1% were invalid.

== Economy ==
As of 2010, Ménières had an unemployment rate of 3.3%. As of 2008, there were 45 people employed in the primary economic sector and about 12 businesses involved in this sector. 22 people were employed in the secondary sector and there were 2 businesses in this sector. 39 people were employed in the tertiary sector, with 7 businesses in this sector. There were 148 residents of the municipality who were employed in some capacity, of which females made up 43.2% of the workforce.

In 2008 the total number of full-time equivalent jobs was 81. The number of jobs in the primary sector was 30, all of which were in agriculture. The number of jobs in the secondary sector was 19 of which 8 or (42.1%) were in manufacturing, 11 or (57.9%) were in mining The number of jobs in the tertiary sector was 32. In the tertiary sector; 11 or 34.4% were in wholesale or retail sales or the repair of motor vehicles, 1 was in the movement and storage of goods, 4 or 12.5% were in a hotel or restaurant, 3 or 9.4% were in education and 7 or 21.9% were in health care.

In 2000, there were 21 workers who commuted into the municipality and 111 workers who commuted away. The municipality is a net exporter of workers, with about 5.3 workers leaving the municipality for every one entering. Of the working population, 4.7% used public transportation to get to work, and 71.6% used a private car.

== Religion ==
From the 2000 census, 235 or 79.1% were Roman Catholic, while 35 or 11.8% belonged to the Swiss Reformed Church. Of the rest of the population, there was 1 member of an Orthodox church, and there was 1 individual who belongs to another Christian church. There were 2 (or about 0.67% of the population) who were Islamic. There was 1 person who was Hindu and 1 individual who belonged to another church. 18 (or about 6.06% of the population) belonged to no church, are agnostic or atheist, and 3 individuals (or about 1.01% of the population) did not answer the question.

== Education ==
In Ménières about 99 or (33.3%) of the population have completed non-mandatory upper secondary education, and 17 or (5.7%) have completed additional higher education (either university or a Fachhochschule). Of the 17 who completed tertiary schooling, 52.9% were Swiss men, 29.4% were Swiss women.

The Canton of Fribourg school system provides one year of non-obligatory Kindergarten, followed by six years of Primary school. This is followed by three years of obligatory lower Secondary school where the students are separated according to ability and aptitude. Following the lower Secondary students may attend a three or four year optional upper Secondary school. The upper Secondary school is divided into gymnasium (university preparatory) and vocational programs. After they finish the upper Secondary program, students may choose to attend a Tertiary school or continue their apprenticeship.

During the 2010–11 school year, there were a total of 50 students attending 3 classes in Ménières. A total of 53 students from the municipality attended any school, either in the municipality or outside of it. There were no kindergarten classes in the municipality, but 11 students attended kindergarten in a neighboring municipality. The municipality had 3 primary classes and 50 students. During the same year, there were no lower secondary classes in the municipality, but 11 students attended lower secondary school in a neighboring municipality. There were no upper Secondary classes or vocational classes, but there were 4 upper Secondary vocational students who attended classes in another municipality. The municipality had no non-university Tertiary classes, but there were 2 non-university Tertiary students and one specialized Tertiary student who attended classes in another municipality.

As of 2000, there were 29 students in Ménières who came from another municipality, while 37 residents attended schools outside the municipality.
