= Fétigny, Switzerland =

Fétigny
- Municipality
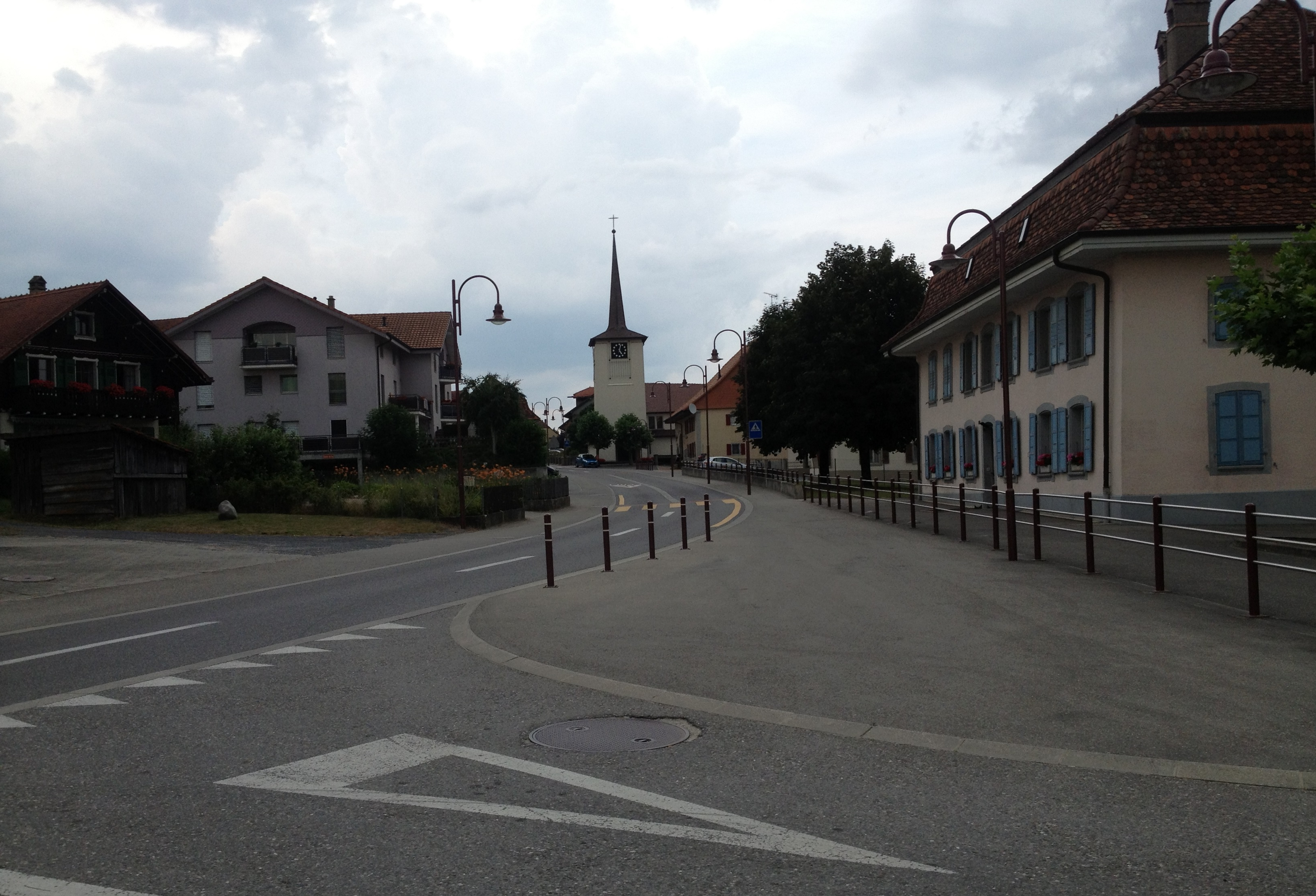

- Flag Coat of arms
- Location of Fétigny
- Location within Switzerland Location within Canton of Fribourg
- Coordinates: 46°48′N 6°55′E
- Country: Switzerland
- Canton: Fribourg
- District: Broye

Government
  - Mayor: Syndic

Area
  - Total: 4.08 km^{2} (1.58 sq mi)
- Elevation: 458 m (1,503 ft)

Population (December 2020)
  - Total: 1,080
  - Density: 265/km^{2} (686/sq mi)
- Time zone: UTC+01:00 (CET)
  - Summer (DST): UTC+02:00 (CEST)
- Postal code: 1532
- SFOS number: 2016
- ISO 3166 code: CH-FR
- Surrounded by: Cugy, Granges-près-Marnand (VD), Ménières, Payerne (VD), Trey (VD)
- Website: fetigny.ch

Fétigny (French pronunciation: [fetiɲi]; Arpitan: Fethegni [feθəˈɲi]) is a former municipality in the district of Broye, in the canton of Fribourg, Switzerland. On 1 January 2026 the former municipalities of Fétigny and Ménières merged into the municipality of Fétigny-Ménières.

== History ==
Fétigny is first mentioned in 1142 as Festignei.

== Geography ==
Fétigny has an area, as of 2009, of 4.1 square kilometers (1.6 mi^{2}). Of this area, 3.13 km^{2} (1.21 mi^{2}) or 76.7% is used for agricultural purposes, while 0.39 km^{2} (0.15 mi^{2}) or 9.6% is forested. Of the rest of the land, 0.5 km^{2} (0.19 mi^{2}) or 12.3% is settled (buildings or roads), 0.05 km^{2} (12 acres) or 1.2% is either rivers or lakes.

Of the built up area, industrial buildings made up 1.5% of the total area while housing and buildings made up 6.4% and transportation infrastructure made up 3.2%. Out of the forested land, 7.6% of the total land area is heavily forested and 2.0% is covered with orchards or small clusters of trees. Of the agricultural land, 67.6% is used for growing crops and 9.1% is pastures. All the water in the municipality is flowing water.

The municipality is located in the Broye district, in the Estavayer-le-Lac exclave.

== Coat of arms ==
The blazon of the municipal coat of arms is Or, a Chevron-Gemels Gules, overall a Burgundy Cross Sable.

== Demographics ==
Fétigny has a population (as of December 2020) of 1,080. As of 2008, 9.1% of the population are resident foreign nationals. Over the last 10 years (2000–2010) the population has changed at a rate of 36.5%. Migration accounted for 19.6%, while births and deaths accounted for 11%.

Most of the population (as of 2000) speaks French (570 or 97.3%) as their first language, German is the second most common (12 or 2.0%) and Portuguese is the third (2 or 0.3%). There is 1 person who speaks Italian.

As of 2008, the population was 50.1% male and 49.9% female. The population was made up of 358 Swiss men (44.8% of the population) and 43 (5.4%) non-Swiss men. There were 367 Swiss women (45.9%) and 32 (4.0%) non-Swiss women. Of the population in the municipality, 251 or about 42.8% were born in Fétigny and lived there in 2000. There were 141 or 24.1% who were born in the same canton, while 148 or 25.3% were born somewhere else in Switzerland, and 43 or 7.3% were born outside of Switzerland.

The age distribution, as of 2000, in Fétigny is; 89 children or 15.2% of the population are between 0 and 9 years old and 73 teenagers or 12.5% are between 10 and 19. Of the adult population, 75 people or 12.8% of the population are between 20 and 29 years old. 108 people or 18.4% are between 30 and 39, 57 people or 9.7% are between 40 and 49, and 78 people or 13.3% are between 50 and 59. The senior population distribution is 48 people or 8.2% of the population are between 60 and 69 years old, 36 people or 6.1% are between 70 and 79, there are 20 people or 3.4% who are between 80 and 89, and there are 2 people or 0.3% who are 90 and older.

As of 2000, there were 248 people who were single and never married in the municipality. There were 279 married individuals, 38 widows or widowers and 21 individuals who are divorced.

As of 2000, there were 226 private households in the municipality, and an average of 2.6 persons per household. There were 53 households that consist of only one person and 25 households with five or more people. In 2000, a total of 221 apartments (96.5% of the total) were permanently occupied, while 4 apartments (1.7%) were seasonally occupied and 4 apartments (1.7%) were empty. As of 2009, the construction rate of new housing units was 4.9 new units per 1000 residents.

The historical population is given in the following chart:

== Politics ==
In the 2011 federal election the most popular party was the SVP which received 34.0% of the vote. The next three most popular parties were the SP (24.3%), the CVP (23.5%) and the FDP (9.7%).

The SVP improved their position in Fétigny rising to first, from second in 2007 (with 25.5%) The SPS moved from fourth in 2007 (with 17.3%) to second in 2011, the CVP moved from first in 2007 (with 29.1%) to third and the FDP moved from third in 2007 (with 20.0%) to fourth. A total of 241 votes were cast in this election, of which 3 or 1.2% were invalid.

== Economy ==
As of 2010, Fétigny had an unemployment rate of 2.4%. As of 2008, there were 27 people employed in the primary economic sector and about 7 businesses involved in this sector. 19 people were employed in the secondary sector and there were 7 businesses in this sector. 97 people were employed in the tertiary sector, with 9 businesses in this sector. There were 305 residents of the municipality who were employed in some capacity, of which females made up 43.9% of the workforce.

In 2008 the total number of full-time equivalent jobs was 112. The number of jobs in the primary sector was 15, all of which were in agriculture. The number of jobs in the secondary sector was 17 of which 2 or (11.8%) were in manufacturing and 15 (88.2%) were in construction. The number of jobs in the tertiary sector was 80. In the tertiary sector; 3 or 3.8% were in wholesale or retail sales or the repair of motor vehicles, 63 or 78.8% were in the movement and storage of goods, 8 or 10.0% were in a hotel or restaurant, 3 or 3.8% were in education.

In 2000, there were 36 workers who commuted into the municipality and 235 workers who commuted away. The municipality is a net exporter of workers, with about 6.5 workers leaving the municipality for every one entering. Of the working population, 4.6% used public transportation to get to work, and 75.7% used a private car.

== Religion ==
From the 2000 census, 456 or 77.8% were Roman Catholic, while 90 or 15.4% belonged to the Swiss Reformed Church. Of the rest of the population, there were 8 individuals (or about 1.37% of the population) who belonged to another Christian church. There was 1 individual who was Jewish, and 6 (or about 1.02% of the population) who were Islamic. 19 (or about 3.24% of the population) belonged to no church, are agnostic or atheist, and 10 individuals (or about 1.71% of the population) did not answer the question.

== Education ==
In Fétigny about 217 or (37.0%) of the population have completed non-mandatory upper secondary education, and 32 or (5.5%) have completed additional higher education (either university or a Fachhochschule). Of the 32 who completed tertiary schooling, 59.4% were Swiss men, 28.1% were Swiss women.

The Canton of Fribourg school system provides one year of non-obligatory Kindergarten, followed by six years of Primary school. This is followed by three years of obligatory lower Secondary school where the students are separated according to ability and aptitude. Following the lower Secondary students may attend a three or four year optional upper Secondary school. The upper Secondary school is divided into gymnasium (university preparatory) and vocational programs. After they finish the upper Secondary program, students may choose to attend a Tertiary school or continue their apprenticeship.

During the 2010–11 school year, there were a total of 94 students attending 5 classes in Fétigny. A total of 149 students from the municipality attended any school, either in the municipality or outside of it. There were 2 kindergarten classes with a total of 31 students in the municipality. The municipality had 3 primary classes and 63 students. During the same year, there were no lower secondary classes in the municipality, but 29 students attended lower secondary school in a neighboring municipality. There were no upper Secondary classes or vocational classes, but there were 9 upper Secondary vocational students who attended classes in another municipality. The municipality had no non-university Tertiary classes, but there were 2 non-university Tertiary students who attended classes in another municipality.

As of 2000, there were 15 students in Fétigny who came from another municipality, while 66 residents attended schools outside the municipality.
