= Berthoud (surname) =

Berthoud is a surname, and may refer to:

- Alexandre Berthoud (born 1977), Swiss politician
- Alfred Berthoud (1874–1939), Swiss chemist
- Alfred Jacques Henri Berthoud (1802–1887), Swiss merchant and plantation owner
- Charles Berthoud (born 1938), Swiss wrestler
- Denise Berthoud (1916–2005), Swiss lawyer and Red Cross executive
- Edward L. Berthoud (1828–1910), American military officer and engineer
- Eric Berthoud (1900–1989), British oil man and diplomat
- Ferdinand Berthoud (1727–1807), French chronometer-maker
- Henri Berthoud (1877–1948), Swiss civil servant and politician
- Jean-Édouard Berthoud (1846–1916), Swiss lawyer and politician
- Jean-Marc Berthoud (born 1939), Swiss theologian and author
- Jean Berthoud (born 1961), Swiss banker
- John Berthoud (1962–2007), American lobbyist, president of the National Taxpayers Union
- Martin Berthoud (1931–2022), British diplomat
- Phyllis Cox Berthoud (1887–1975), Anglo-Indian tennis player from Bengal
- Raymonde Berthoud (1919–2007), Swiss Red Cross worker in Hungary
- Samuel-Henri Berthoud (1804–1891), French writer and journalist

== See also ==
- Berthaud
