= Jean-Édouard Berthoud =

Jean-Édouard Berthoud (11 December 1846 – 21 June 1916), commonly referred to as Jean Berthoud, was born in Neuchâtel and was married to Georgine Léonie Panier. He was the son of pastoral theology professor Alexis-Henri Berthoud and Louise-Marie Vaucher. He was the nephew of Alfred Jacques Henri Berthoud, father of Henri Berthoud and grandfather of Denise and Raymonde Berthoud.

Berthoud studied law in Neuchâtel. In 1874, he opened a law office in Môtiers which he kept until 1880.

== Political and judicial career ==
- 1874 : Conseiller général of Neuchâtel
- 1874-1877 : Congressman
- 1874-1880 : Sat at the court of appeals
- 1883-1889 : Member of the Council of States
- 1883-1896 : Assizes court of Neuchâtel and Neuchâtel court President
- 1889-1896 : Congressman
- 1896-1908 : Member of the Conseil d'Etat (Department of Justice) and member of the Council of States
