= Henri Berthoud =

Henri Berthoud (14 April 1877 – 3 August 1948) was a Swiss civil servant and member of the Council of States and National Council.

Berthoud was born in Neuchâtel and was the son of Jean-Edouard Berthoud and Georgine Léonie Panier. He was the father of Denise and Raymonde Berthoud, brother-in-law of Louis Perrier, and son-in-law of Louis-Daniel Perrier.

Berthoud studied at the École supérieure de commerce of Neuchâtel along with scientific studies and earned a Ph.D. in chemistry.

== Career ==
- 1906 : Conseiller général
- 1906–1919 : Conseiller communal of the city of Neuchâtel
- 1906–1908 : Public works secretary
- 1908–1912 : Public works director
- 1915–1919 : Public works director (during which were built the "Collège des Parcs", the "Collège de la Maladière" and the "Hôpital des Cadolles")
- 1912–1915 : Head of the Police
- 1916–1941 : Member of the Council of States
- 1923–1928 : Member of the National Council of Switzerland
- 1931–1947 : Member of the National Council of Switzerland

Berthoud sat on the governing board of the "Conseil d'administration de la Chambre neuchâteloise du commerce et de l'industrie" and was president of the Finance Committee.
