= Henri DuPasquier =

Swiss manufacturer and politician (1815–1875)

- Born: 5 July 1815; Neuchâtel, Switzerland
- Died: 12 April 1875 (aged 59)
- Occupations: Manufacturer, politician

Henri DuPasquier (5 July 1815 – 12 April 1875) was a Swiss manufacturer and politician from Fleurier. He directed the Fabrique-Neuve de Cortaillod, which he converted from textile printing into a watch-blank factory, and sat as a liberal deputy in the Grand Council of Neuchâtel.

== Biography ==
DuPasquier was the son of Frédéric, director of the Fabrique-Neuve de Cortaillod, and the great-grandson of Claude-Abram DuPasquier. In 1841 he married Sophie Baux, daughter of Jules Baux, a merchant. He studied industrial chemistry in Strasbourg and then trained in industry in England. On the death of his father in 1838, he took over the management of the factory.

In 1854 he decided to stop printing indiennes and converted the business into a factory producing watch blanks under the name Vaucher DuPasquier et Cie. A member of the Société du Jardin from 1836 and a militia captain, he sat as a liberal deputy in the Grand Council of Neuchâtel (1852–1874, serving as president in 1865). He was the author of several works on the labor question.

== Bibliography ==
- J. Th. Du Pasquier, La famille Du Pasquier, 1974
