= Bonhote =

Bonhote or Bonhôte is a surname and can refer to:

== People ==
- Anne Valerie Bonhote Henderson, peerage person
- Elizabeth Bonhôte (1744–1818), English novelist, essayist, and poet
- Eugène Bonhôte (1857-1924), Swiss politician
- Ian Bonhôte, film producer, director, and screenwriter
- James Edward Bonhote Foster (b. 1982), British peer
- James-Henri Bonhôte (1832-1892)
- Jean-Marc Bonhôte (1903-1973), author and publisher
- J. Lewis Bonhote (1875–1922), English zoologist, ornithologist, and writer
- Julian David Bonhote Wilson (1940–2014), BBC Television horse racing correspondent
- Michael Bonhote Rodney Foster, peerage person
- Pierre Bonhôte (1965-2016), Swiss politician
- Thomas Bonhôte Henderson (1875–1920), English first-class cricketer and surgeon
- Walter Edward Bonhote Henderson (1880–1944), British track and field athlete

== Other ==
- Banque Bonhôte, Swiss private bank founded in 1815 in Neuchâtel
