= Wodey-Suchard =

Swiss pâtisserie and confectionery founded in 1825

Wodey-Suchard is a pâtisserie and confectionery in the pedestrian zone of Neuchâtel, Switzerland. Founded in 1825 by Philippe Suchard, it is one of the oldest in Switzerland and the oldest still operating in Neuchâtel.
