= Câbles Cortaillod =

Swiss electric cable manufacturer

- Trade name: Nexans Suisse SA
- Formerly: Société d'exploitation des câbles électriques, système Berthoud, Borel & Cie; Alcatel Cable Suisse SA
- Industry: Electric cables
- Founded: 1879
- Founders: Edouard Berthoud; François Borel
- Headquarters: Cortaillod, Switzerland
- Products: Lead-sheathed electric cables; cable accessories
- Number of employees: 300 (Cortaillod site)
- Parent: Nexans (from 2001)
- Website: nexans.ch

Câbles Cortaillod is a Swiss manufacturer of electric cables, founded in 1879 in Cortaillod by Edouard Berthoud and François Borel. It was the world's first factory for lead-sheathed electric cables. In 1994 it came under the control of the French group Alcatel-Alsthom, and since 2001 it has been a subsidiary of the French group Nexans under the name Nexans Suisse SA.

== History ==
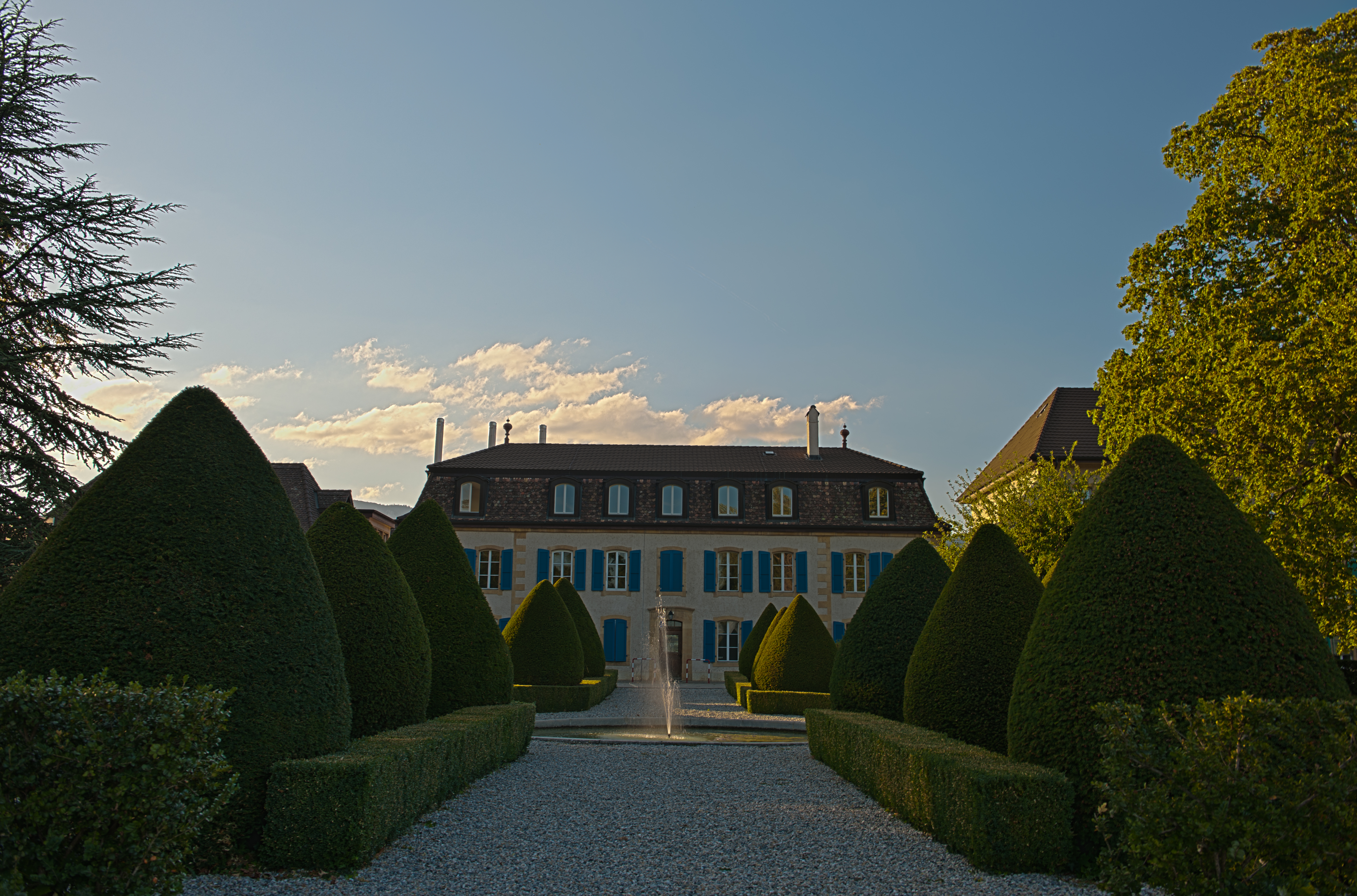
La Fabrique-Neuve in Cortaillod

The company was founded in 1879 in Cortaillod by the industrialist Edouard Berthoud and the civil engineer François Borel, in the former indienne factory known as the Fabrique-Neuve. The world's first factory for lead-sheathed electric cables, it also produced the accessories needed to fit and lay them. In 1884 it became a joint-stock company under the name Société d'exploitation des câbles électriques, système Berthoud, Borel & Cie, and in 1975 a holding company. It absorbed the cable works of Cossonay and Breitenbach.

In 1994, following a public takeover bid, the company came under the control of the French group Alcatel-Alsthom. It was then active in three sectors: cable production, the distribution of electrotechnical equipment, and the operation of cable television networks. In 1996 the last of these, called Rediffusion, was taken over by the company Cablecom. As Alcatel Cable Suisse SA, the company was part of the Alcatel Suisse SA group, based in Zurich. Since 2001, under the name Nexans Suisse SA, it has been a subsidiary of the French international group Nexans.

== Bibliography ==
- M. de Coulon, Société d'exploitation des câbles électriques système Berthoud, Borel & Cie, Cortaillod, 1879–1929, 1929
- C.-A. Clerc, "Cent ans de Câbles Cortaillod", in Le toron, 29, 1979, 5–18
