= Globe Céleste =

Coordinates: 48°51′27″N 2°17′34″E

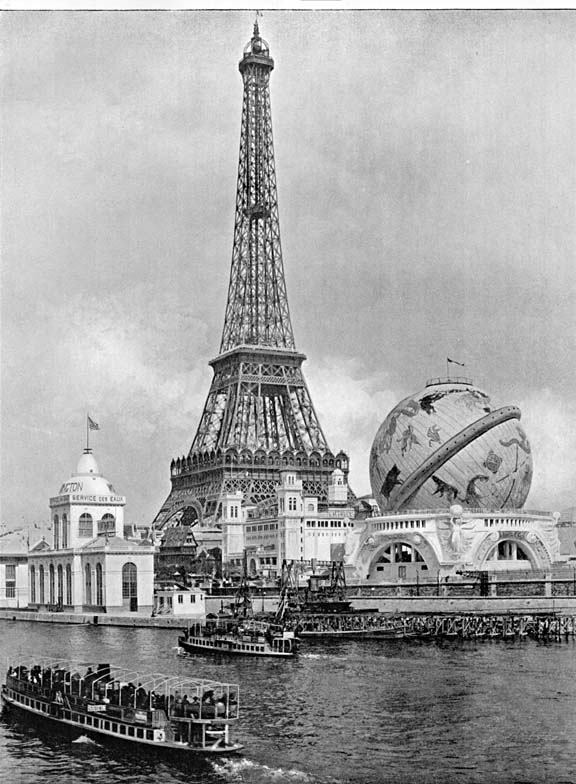
Photo across the Seine of the Globe Céleste beside the Eiffel Tower.

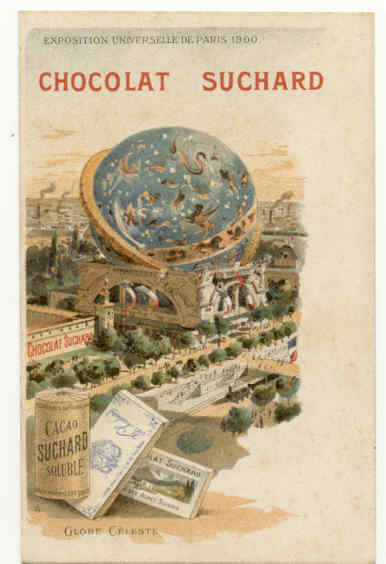
Postcard of Suchard, a Swiss brand of chocolate.

The Globe Céleste was an icon of the Exposition Universelle of 1900 in Paris, similar to the Eiffel Tower. It was constructed in the shape of a large globe and stood close to the Eiffel Tower. It was in the form of a blue and gold sphere, 45 meters in diameter, on which were painted the constellations and signs of the zodiac. The sphere rested on a base about 18 meters high, made up of four masonry pillars that housed staircases and elevators, giving access to a flower-decked terrace at the top of the globe that was "catered for armchair space-travellers: spectators leaned back in easy chairs while panoramas depicting the solar system were rolled past."

The attraction had been designed by Napoleon de Tédesco and built according to the Matrai system.

On April 29, 1900, the pedestrian bridge to the tourist attraction collapsed near Suffren Avenue, killing 9 people and injuring several others. The accident led the French authorities to an inquiry. The Committee on Reinforced Cement was created by the ministerial decree of December 19, 1900. A later judicial proceeding held the City of Paris responsible, condemning it for carrying out excavations too close to the bridge which led to its collapse.
