= Claude-Abram DuPasquier =

Swiss textile manufacturer (1717–1783)

- Born: 21 December 1717; Fleurier, Principality of Neuchâtel
- Died: 29 December 1783 (aged 66); Cortaillod, Principality of Neuchâtel
- Occupation: Textile manufacturer

Claude-Abram DuPasquier (21 December 1717 – 29 December 1783) was a Swiss textile manufacturer from Fleurier. In 1752 he co-founded the Fabrique-Neuve de Cortaillod, a major manufacturer of printed cotton fabrics (indiennes), which he directed until his death.

== Biography ==
DuPasquier was the son of Pierre, a notary. In 1746 he married Suzanne Liengme, daughter of Jean-Pierre, also a notary. He learned the principles of printed-cloth manufacture in southern Germany and became production manager at Jean-Jacques Jequier's factory at Le Bied (in the municipality of Colombier) in 1742.

In 1752, together with Jean-Jacques Bovet, he founded the Fabrique-Neuve de Cortaillod, whose management occupied him until his death. Several of his eleven children went into the manufacture or trade of indiennes, among them Henri (1752–1811), who succeeded him at the head of the Fabrique-Neuve in 1783.

== Bibliography ==
- J. Th. Du Pasquier, La famille Du Pasquier, 1974
- P. Caspard, La Fabrique-Neuve de Cortaillod, 1979
