= Fabrique-Neuve de Cortaillod =

Swiss textile printing manufacturer

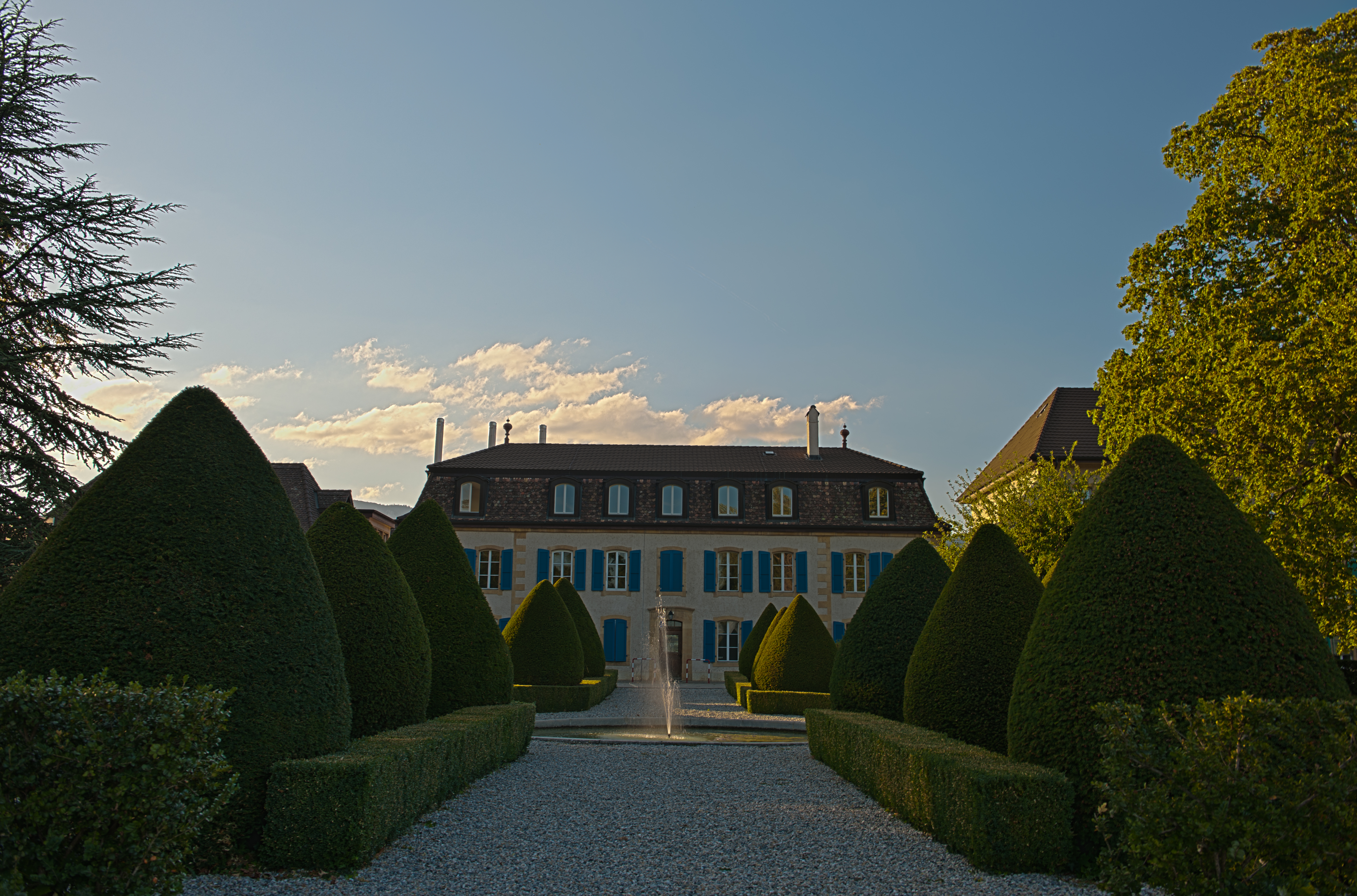
- Type: Manufacturer
- Industry: Textile printing
- Founded: 1752 in Cortaillod, Switzerland
- Founder: Claude-Abram DuPasquier, Jean-Jacques Bovet
- Defunct: 1854
- Fate: Liquidated
- Headquarters: Cortaillod, Switzerland
- Products: Printed cotton fabrics (indiennes)
- Number of employees: up to 800

The Fabrique-Neuve de Cortaillod was a Swiss textile printing manufacturer based in Cortaillod, active from 1752 to 1854. One of the largest concentrated manufactories in Europe in the late 18th century, it produced printed cotton fabrics known as indiennes.

== History ==
The Fabrique-Neuve was founded in 1752 by Claude-Abram DuPasquier and Jean-Jacques Bovet at Cortaillod. It exemplified the indiennes industry, which in the 18th century was one of the leading sectors of the first industrial revolution. The company enjoyed growing prosperity until the end of the 1790s, working on commission for the Neuchâtel trading company directed by Jacques-Louis de Pourtalès, which supplied it annually with more than a million livres' worth of white cloth and dyeing products and then sold its printed fabrics, chiefly in France, Germany, and Italy.

At that time the Fabrique-Neuve employed up to 800 workers, most of them gathered at Cortaillod itself, the rest scattered across the Pays de Vaud and the canton of Fribourg on the southern shore of Lake Neuchâtel. They produced 600,000 square meters of hand-printed and hand-painted cloth annually. In the 1780s and 1790s the Fabrique-Neuve was one of the largest concentrated manufactories in Europe across all industrial branches.

From 1810 the company adopted the roller printing machine, but its markets were limited by emerging European protectionism. It found new outlets from Rio de Janeiro to Calcutta and from New York to Alexandria, but transport and exchange costs ate into its margins. The company's turnover and workforce declined continuously until 1854, when Henri DuPasquier, the last descendant of the founder, wound up the business.

== Bibliography ==
- Caspard, Pierre, La Fabrique-Neuve de Cortaillod. Entreprise et profit pendant la révolution industrielle, 1752–1854, 1979
- Caspard, Pierre, "Les pinceleuses d'Estavayer. Stratégies patronales sur le marché du travail féminin au XVIIIe siècle", in Revue suisse d'histoire, 36, 1986, pp. 121–156

=== Archives ===
- Archives de l'État de Neuchâtel, Neuchâtel, Fonds Fabrique-Neuve de Cortaillod, 1747–1828
