= Alexandre Berthoud =

Swiss politician (born 1977)

Alexandre Berthoud (born 29 June 1977) is a Swiss politician and a member of the Grand Council of Vaud elected in 2012. He chaired the council’s Finance Committee for five years (2015–2020). He is vice president of the PLR Vaud since 2018. Berthoud is president of Economic Commission and a member of board of directors of LEB.
