= Louis-Daniel Perrier =

Swiss architect (1818–1903)

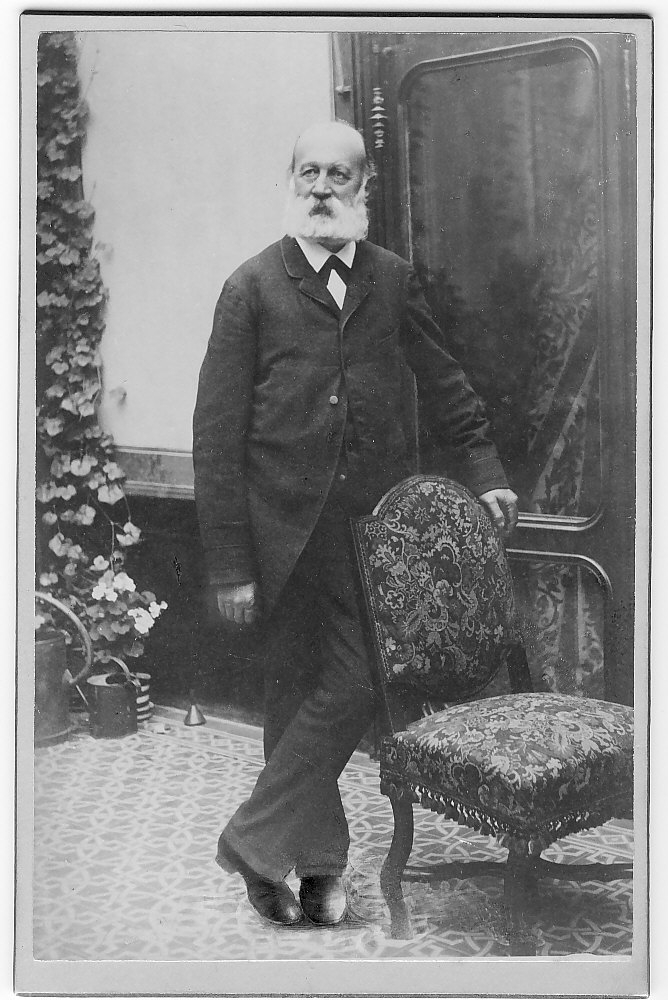

Louis-Daniel Perrier (1818–1903) was a Swiss architect from Neuchâtel, Switzerland. He was born in Paris although he was originally from the towns of Sainte-Croix and Orges in Switzerland. He studied art in Paris and Berlin before moving to Neuchâtel in 1848.

He was the architect for the government of the Canton of Neuchâtel between 1849 and 1863. In 1864 and until 1867, he was construction director for the city of Neuchâtel. He constructed Philippe Suchard's house, the church of Les Brenets, the primary school "Le Collège de la Promenade" in Neuchâtel, and restored the castles of Neuchâtel and Cormondrèche among other works.

He was married to Cécile Dardel and is the father of the Federal Councillor Louis Perrier. He was also the great-grandfather of Denise and Raymonde Berthoud.
