= Raymonde Berthoud =

Raymonde Berthoud (24 November 1919 – 27 May 2007) was born in Neuchâtel, Switzerland and was the fourth of Henri Berthoud and Marianne Perrier's five children. She was the sister of Denise Berthoud, granddaughter of Jean-Edouard Berthoud, great-niece of Louis Perrier and great-granddaughter of Louis-Daniel Perrier.

She is the first Swiss citizen to have ever earned the Swiss Abroad Prize for her huge contribution to her country's image. She hid Jews during the Second World War from the Gestapo in Budapest and also worked during six years in Budapest for the Swiss Red Cross delegation. Berthoud was given the title of honorary president of the Swiss Club in Hungary. In 1998 she was honored for her lifetime achievements when she received the Officer's Cross of the Republic of Hungary from Prime Minister Viktor Orbán. She died in Budapest where she is buried at the Fiume Road National Graveyard.
