= Alfred Jacques Henri Berthoud =

Swiss plantation owner in Suriname (1802–1887)

- Born: November 6, 1802; Neuchâtel, Switzerland
- Died: July 10, 1887 (aged 84); Boudevilliers, Switzerland
- Occupations: Merchant, plantation owner
- Known for: Plantation ownership in Suriname, municipal politics in Neuchâtel
- Spouse(s): Charlotte Christiana Weissenbruch (m. 1832; died 1834) Anne Louise Coulon (m. 1838)
- Children: 8 (with second wife)
- Parent(s): David Auguste Berthoud; Nancy Anne Guillebert

Alfred Jacques Henri Berthoud (6 November 1802 – 10 July 1887) was a Swiss merchant and plantation owner who operated multiple sugar and coffee plantations in Suriname during the colonial period. He later served as a municipal councillor and treasurer (maître des clefs) in his native Neuchâtel. His business ventures in South America relied on enslaved labor, making him part of the colonial Atlantic slave trade network operating from Switzerland.

== Early life and family ==
Alfred Jacques Henri Berthoud was born on 6 November 1802 in Neuchâtel, Switzerland, to David Auguste Berthoud and Nancy Anne (known as Nanette) Guillebert. His mother was the daughter of a Neuchâtel councillor. He was the seventh of ten children, five of whom died in infancy. Little is known about his formal education or early training.

The Berthoud family had entrepreneurial ambitions beyond Switzerland's borders. Three siblings emigrated to pursue commercial opportunities in Amsterdam, Brazil, and Suriname, reflecting the international trading networks that connected Swiss merchants to colonial enterprises during this period.

== Colonial career in Suriname ==
=== Early settlement and first plantation ===
Berthoud emigrated to Paramaribo, the capital of Suriname, at a very young age, likely in 1821. There he established himself as a merchant engaged in maritime trade and colonial commerce. His business activities were part of the broader Dutch colonial economic system that relied heavily on plantation agriculture and enslaved labor.

In 1828, Berthoud purchased his first plantation, Boksweide, located on the Tapoeripa River. This sugar cane plantation marked the beginning of his expansion into colonial agriculture. He subsequently acquired the nearby plantation of Kleinslust, which was later renamed Berthoudslust and specialized in coffee and cotton production.

=== Marriage and business expansion ===
In 1832, Berthoud married Charlotte Christiana (Christina) Esther Weissenbruch, daughter of Carl Ludwig Weissenbruch, a powerful administrator who managed numerous plantations throughout Suriname. This marriage connected Berthoud to one of the most influential German-Dutch families in the colony and significantly expanded his business network. His father-in-law, Carl Ludwig Weissenbruch, was married to Anna Catharina Geijer.

Through these connections and his own acquisitions, Berthoud eventually controlled approximately ten plantation estates, either as sole owner or co-proprietor. These plantations utilized enslaved African and Afro-Surinamese people as the primary labor force. The Vaudois administrator Marc Warnery briefly managed the Kleinslust plantation for several months in 1830.

=== Personal tragedy and return to Switzerland ===
Berthoud's colonial career was marked by personal tragedy when his young wife Charlotte died in childbirth at the end of 1833 or beginning of 1834, along with their baby. This devastating loss prompted his decision to return to Switzerland, though he maintained ownership of most of his Surinamese plantations, entrusting their management to administrators. The primary administrator was a Frenchman named Ph. Kuvel.

== Life in Switzerland ==
=== Second marriage and family ===
In 1838, Berthoud remarried in Neuchâtel to Anne Louise Coulon, daughter of Paul-Louis-Auguste Coulon, a prominent merchant, banker, and co-founder of the Caisse d'épargne (Savings Bank) of Neuchâtel. Anne Louise's mother was Julie de Meuron. The Coulon family had their own colonial connections—Anne Louise's grandfather, Paul Louis Coulon, had been a co-proprietor of plantations in Grenada.

The couple had eight children together, including Edouard Berthoud, who would later become co-founder of Câbles Cortaillod in 1879, a major Swiss industrial enterprise.

=== Continued plantation management ===
Despite residing in Switzerland, Berthoud maintained active oversight of his Surinamese properties, necessitating frequent business trips to Amsterdam, which served as the commercial hub for Dutch colonial trade. In 1840-1841, he undertook a significant journey to Paramaribo, traveling aboard the three-masted ship Jeune Louis Antoine under Captain Tjebbes from Nieuwe Diep to Suriname.

During this visit, likely anticipating the eventual abolition of slavery, Berthoud decided to sell nearly all of his plantations. He disposed of the remaining properties before 1863, the year slavery in Suriname was officially abolished. This strategic divestment allowed him to liquidate his colonial assets while they still retained significant value.

=== Municipal career ===
Berthoud became actively involved in Neuchâtel municipal politics upon his return to Switzerland. In 1839, he was elected to the Conseil des Quarante (Council of Forty), the city's governing body. His business acumen and financial expertise led to his appointment in 1846 as maître des clefs (master of keys), serving as the city's treasurer. This position made him one of the four principal municipal magistrates (Quatre-Ministraux) responsible for Neuchâtel's financial administration.

== Death and legacy ==
Alfred Jacques Henri Berthoud died on 10 July 1887 in Boudevilliers, Switzerland, at the age of 84. His life exemplified the complex connections between Swiss commerce and colonial plantation economies during the 19th century. While he achieved prominence in Swiss municipal politics, his wealth was fundamentally built upon the exploitation of enslaved labor in Suriname.

His son Edouard Berthoud's founding of Câbles Cortaillod represents how colonial wealth was later reinvested in Swiss industrial development, contributing to the country's emergence as a major industrial power in the late 19th century.

== Bibliography ==
- Archives de la vie ordinaire, Neuchâtel, Fonds Alfred-J. Berthoud et Anne-Louise Coulon (correspondence with his mother and letters to his second wife, 1836-1841)
- Bibliothèque cantonale et universitaire Lausanne, Lausanne, Marc Warnery
- Pavillon, Olivier: "Alfred Jacques Henri Berthoud (1802-1887) négociant et planteur au Surinam", in: Revue historique neuchâteloise, 2013/2, pp. 81–101
