= Cortaillod =

- Municipality
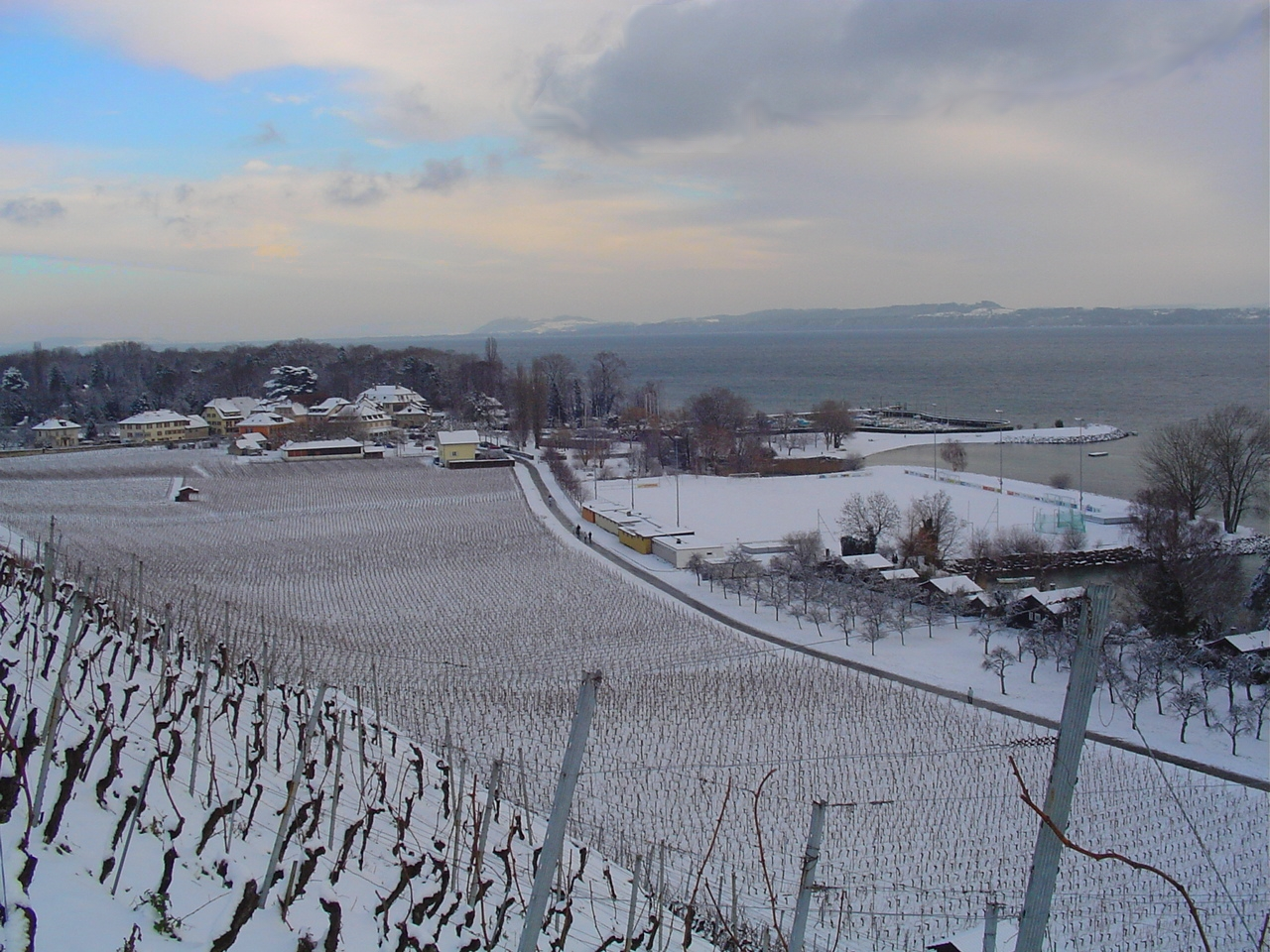
- Vineyards outside Cortaillod village

- Flag Coat of arms
- Location of Cortaillod
- Location within Switzerland Location within Canton of Neuchâtel
- Coordinates: 46°57′N 6°51′E
- Country: Switzerland
- Canton: Neuchâtel

Area
  - Total: 3.67 km^{2} (1.42 sq mi)
- Elevation: 484 m (1,588 ft)

Population (December 2007)
  - Total: 4,416
  - Density: 1,200/km^{2} (3,120/sq mi)
- Time zone: UTC+01:00 (CET)
  - Summer (DST): UTC+02:00 (CEST)
- Postal code: 2016
- SFOS number: 6408
- ISO 3166 code: CH-NE
- Surrounded by: Bevaix, Boudry, Colombier
- Twin towns: Maienfeld (Switzerland)
- Website: www.cortaillod.ch

Cortaillod is a municipality in the canton of Neuchâtel in Switzerland.

The Neolithic Cortaillod culture was named after Cortaillod, where four Neolithic villages have been discovered.

== History ==
Cortaillod is first mentioned in 1311 as Cortaillot.

=== Neolithic settlements ===
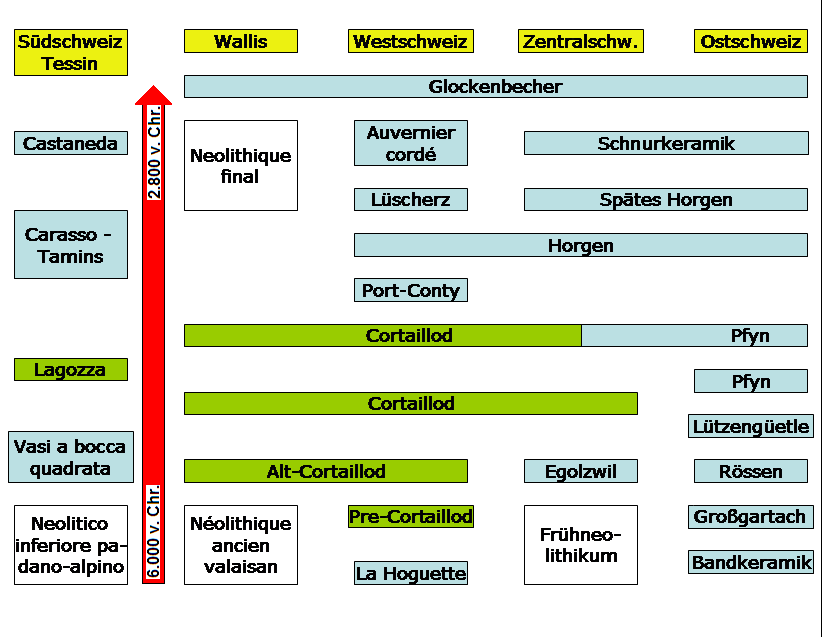
Dates and locations of prehistoric Swiss cultures

Cortaillod gave its name to the Cortaillod culture, a Neolithic culture in Switzerland and surrounding areas. There are four Neolithic sites along the lake shore at Cortaillod; La Fabrique or Le Vivier which is now eroding, Les Cotes which was almost completely washed out in 1880, Petit-Cortaillod and La Tuillières. At La Tuillières several large flint and stone axes were found. Petit-Cortaillod is the largest and most productive. It is about 300 m × 60 m (980 ft × 200 ft) and is between 0.6 to 1.25 m (2 ft 0 in to 4 ft 1 in) thick. These sites were originally underwater, but were discovered when the water level of Lake Neuchâtel dropped. Because they were no longer flooded, between 1876 and 1879 the sites were looted. Many items were bought by museums or private collectors with limited study and documentation. The first scientific study was done in 1878 by Albert Vouga and Fritz Borel at the Petit-Cortaillod site. Their first excavations went down to a chalk layer at a depth of 1.25 m (4.1 ft). The list of objects excavated on this occasion is impressive: thousands of flints and awls made of bone, 3,000 ax shafts, and about 2,000 smaller axes and hatchets.

=== Bronze age settlements ===
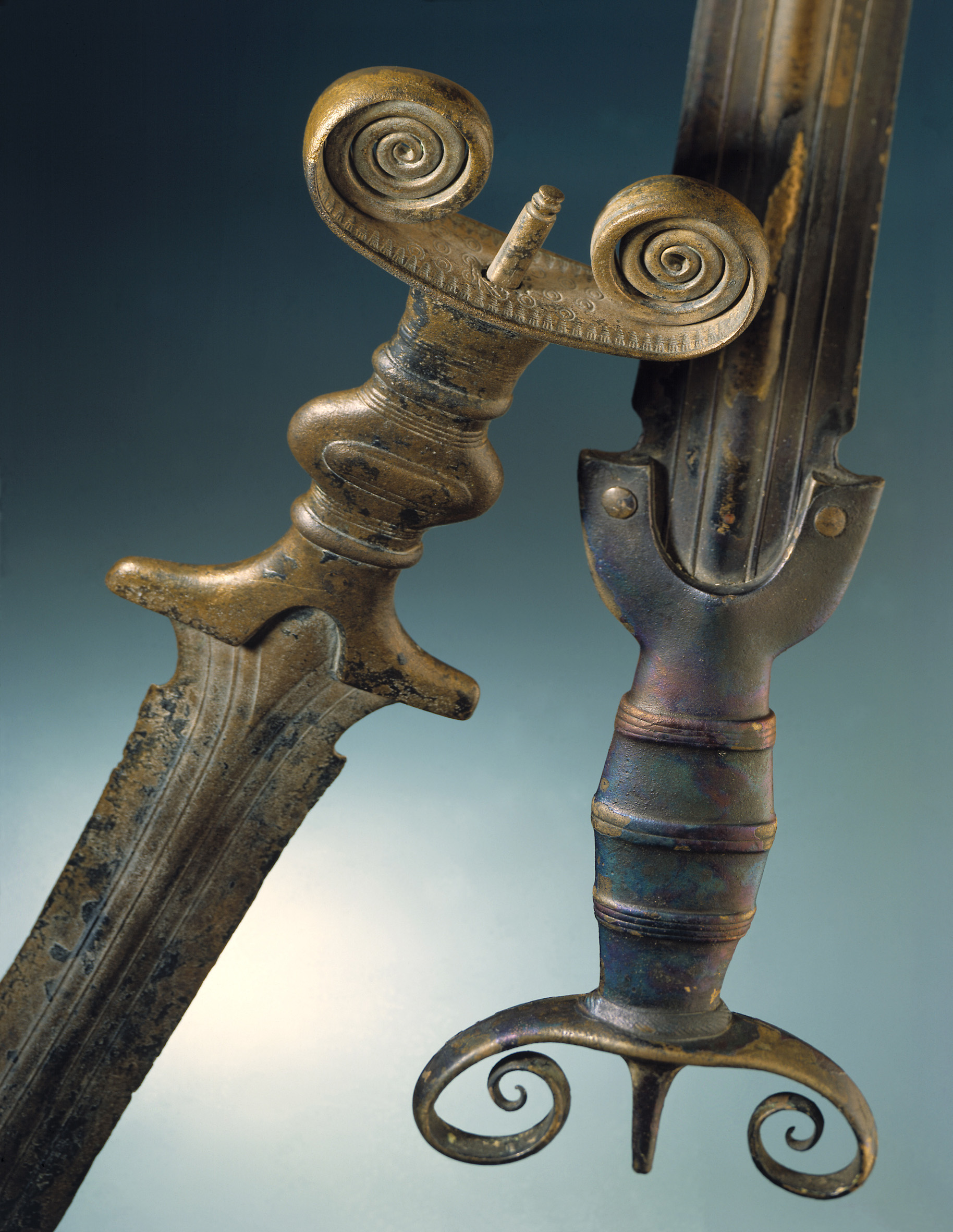
Bronze sword hilts from Cortaillod and Auvernier, (c. 1000-900 B.C.)

Ferdinand Keller and Frederic Troyon reported the discovery of lake shore settlements from the Late Bronze Age (1250-800 BC) in 1858. Friedrich Schwab and Edouard Desor's archeological excavations found many bronze items. One of the most striking items, a wheel spoke made of bronze and oak wood with a diameter of 51 cm (20 in), was discovered in 1862. Other finds included axes, sickles and needles as well as bronze swords and hundreds of vases. There were also a number of crescent-shaped earthenware objects called d'argile croissants. The d'argile croissants are about 30 cm (12 in) long and may represent constellations. After the first Jura water correction dropped the water levels by 2.7 m (8.9 ft), the sites began to erode. In 1925 Paul Vouga took soundings to study the stratigraphy of the site. At his request, the Army made a series of aerial photographs in 1927, which provided a number of fundamental insights into these villages from the Bronze Age.

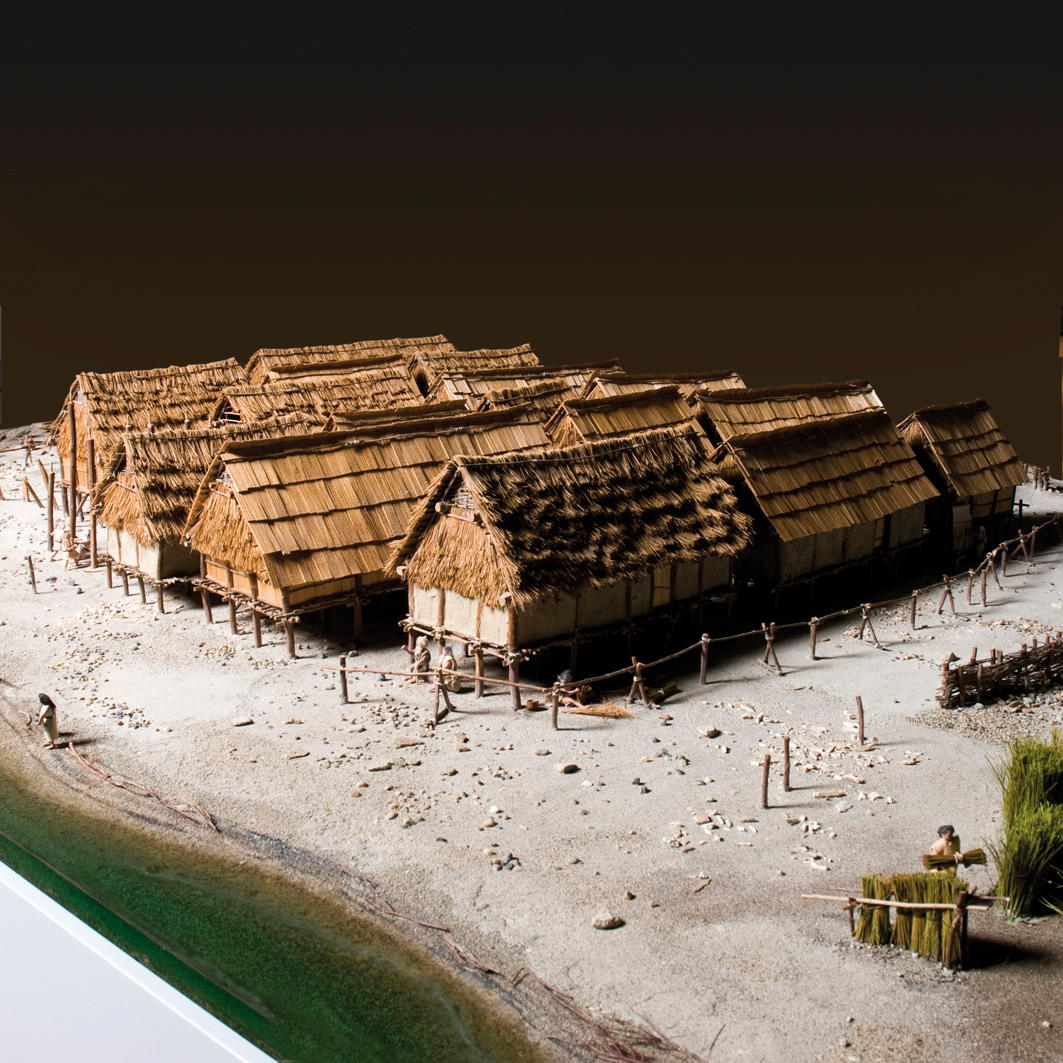
Model of the Cortaillod-Est settlement

The settlement at Cortaillod-Est was explored by divers in 1981–84. They were able to use dendrochronology to determine that the settlement was inhabited between 1010 and 955 BC. At its largest, it consisted of eight parallel rows of houses (total 22 houses), which were separated by straight-line paths. The houses were built on dry stone foundations. It was enclosed by a fence that was built in a semicircular arc and covered an area of about 5,200 m^{2} (1.3 acres). Cortaillod-Plage, the extension of the village to the north-east was inhabited between 968 and 954 BC. The settlement was built on an area of approximately 2,500 m^{2} (27,000 ft^{2}). The village of Cortaillod Les Esserts was surrounded by a 120 m (390 ft) long, three layer palisade. Cortaillod Les Esserts was inhabited between 870 and 850 BC and had an area of between 15,000–18,000 square metres (3.7–4.4 acres). It had a road running through the center of the village with houses on both sides.

La Fabrique or Le Vivier, the other Bronze Age site, is located above the Neolithic site. During the construction of the A1 motorway in 1993–98, the site was explored. In 1993 in Murgiers, two cremation graves from the Late Bronze Age (Hallstatt A 1) were discovered. One of the graves contained both offerings and a ceramic jar containing the cremated bones of a person. The other grave had fine pottery including vases with a decorative edge. The excavations at Petit Ruz in 1995-97 discovered many traces of a Bronze Age settlement, including some 300 post holes, numerous pits and hearths, and a 2.50 m × 84 m (8.2 ft × 275.6 ft) gravel road. An excavation at Champ Basset in 1996 discovered a circular pit 4 m (13 ft) in diameter. This pit contained 27 kg (60 lb) of very well preserved pottery from the Hallstatt period. Other sites in Cortaillod include postholes, burials, hearths and pottery at Tolay, in Champ Barrett, Rochettes in Chanélaz and at Tilles as well as a number of tombs from the La Tène period at Courbes Rayes.

=== Medieval town ===
Part of Cortaillod was given in 1311 to Peter Stäffis, Lord of Gorgier as a result of an exchange that he made with Count Rudolph IV of Neuchâtel. During the Middle Ages the ownership of the village was quite complicated. Members of the parishes of Pontareuse and Bevaix both lived there. The municipal community consisted of citizens of Boudry (who were under the Lord of Gorgier) and also subjects of the priory of Bevaix. Each feudal lord had a bailiff or magistrate to represent him in the village. There was only a civil court in Cortaillod, criminal cases were heard by one of the feudal lords. Starting in 1379 the inhabitants of the municipal community, owned their own pastures. In 1499 Philip of Hochberg, Count of Neuchatel, allowed them the right to farm the sandy shoreline. Between 1541 and 1545, the Lord of Colombier bought Cortaillod from the two preceding feudal lords. However, Cortaillod was sold to the Count of Neuchâtel in 1564, and became part of the County of Neuchâtel. The inhabitants then called themselves citizens of Boudry, but they did not enjoy all the citizenship rights.

=== Early modern and modern Cortaillod ===
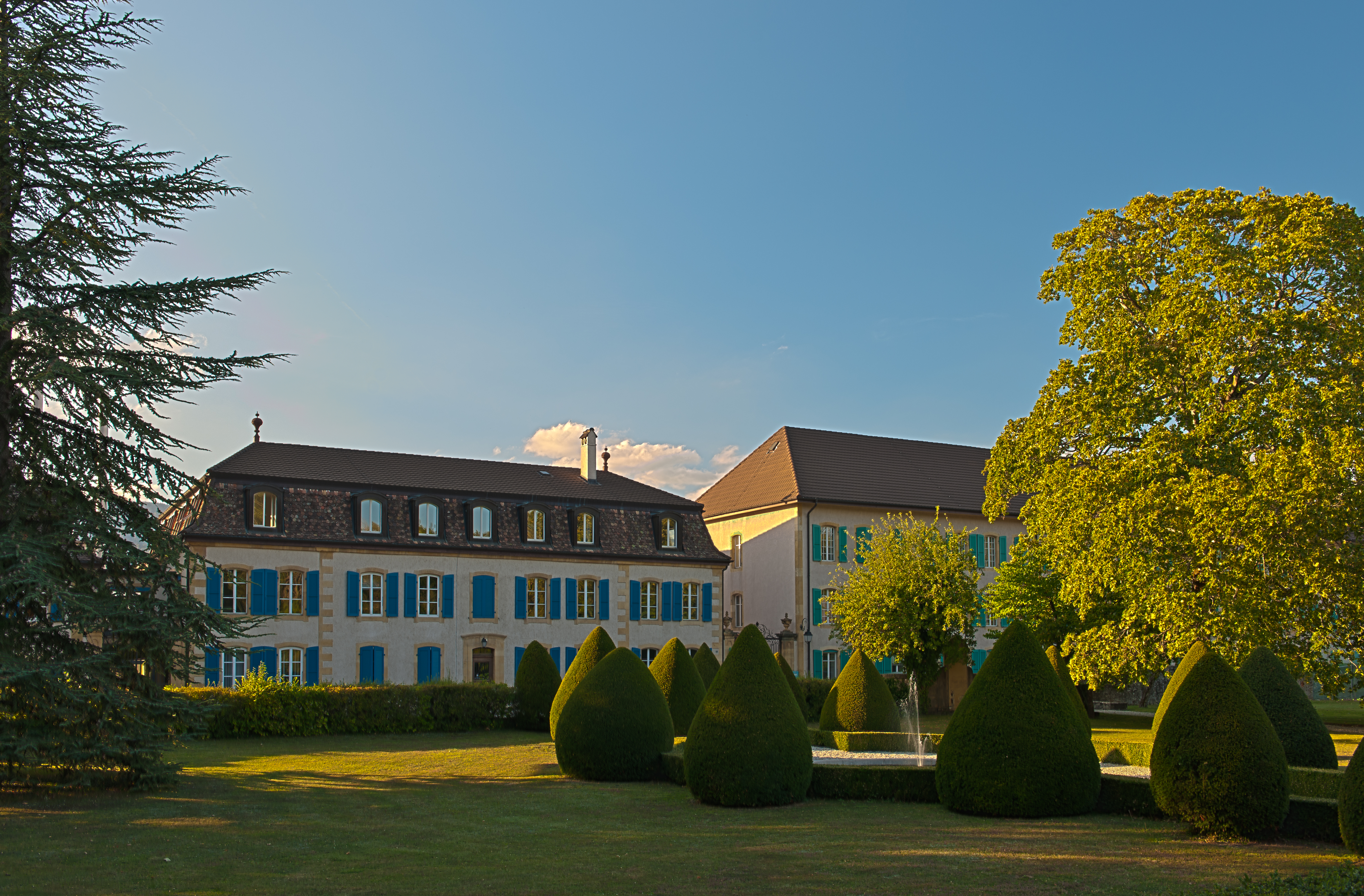
The Fabrique-Neuve de Cortaillod opened in 1752

During the 15th to 19th centuries, there were repeated disputes between Cortaillod and the municipal community of Boudry. The disputes were over the division of the common pastures and forests and a special tax (Eminem de la porte), which had to be paid by the residents of Cortaillod but only benefited Boudry. This tax was abolished in 1813.

In 1503, the Bishop of Lausanne allowed the villagers to establish a chapel. The Chapel of St. Nicholas was consecrated two years later. Until 1524 the pastor of Pontareuse and Bevaix protested against the permanent presence of a priest in Cortaillod. The village finally became an important parish when it accepted the Protestant Reformation. In 1537 it became an independent parish.

The first weaving mill in Cortaillod opened in 1731 and was open for about 30 years. In 1752 the famous Fabrique-Neuve de Cortaillod mill opened near the other mills. It remained in operation until 1854. The building was then acquired in 1879 by Câbles Cortaillod. The company remained one of the most important companies in the municipality, even after it was acquired in 2001 by Nexans Schweiz AG. Between 1855 and 1885 there was a watch factory in Cortaillod. The European manufacturing and technology center of Silicon Graphics settled in Cortaillod in 1992. However, this plant, which employed about 300 people, closed in 2001. Viticulture remains a significant part of the local economy, and the wines of Cortaillod enjoy a good reputation.

== Geography ==
Aerial view (1954)

Cortaillod has an area, as of 2009, of 3.7 square kilometers (1.4 mi^{2}). Of this area, 1.73 km^{2} (0.67 mi^{2}) or 46.9% is used for agricultural purposes, while 0.42 km^{2} (0.16 mi^{2}) or 11.4% is forested. Of the rest of the land, 1.48 km^{2} (0.57 mi^{2}) or 40.1% is settled (buildings or roads), 0.02 km^{2} (4.9 acres) or 0.5% is either rivers or lakes and 0.01 km^{2} (2.5 acres) or 0.3% is unproductive land.

Of the built up area, industrial buildings made up 4.9% of the total area while housing and buildings made up 20.1% and transportation infrastructure made up 6.8%. Power and water infrastructure as well as other special developed areas made up 6.0% of the area while parks, green belts and sports fields made up 2.4%. Out of the forested land, 9.8% of the total land area is heavily forested and 1.6% is covered with orchards or small clusters of trees. Of the agricultural land, 23.0% is used for growing crops and 4.6% is pastures, while 19.2% is used for orchards or vine crops. All the water in the municipality is flowing water.

The municipality was located in the Boudry district until the district level was eliminated on 1 January 2018. It is on a hillside above a steep drop into Lake Neuchatel. It consists of the village of Cortaillod above the lake, a residential development on the lake shore at Petit Cortaillod harbor and the largest forest on the Boudry hills.

The proposed merger of the municipalities of Bevaix, Boudry and Cortaillod was rejected by the residents.

== Coat of arms ==
The blazon of the municipal coat of arms is Vert, a Cross patte Argent ensigned with a Crescent increscent Or.

== Demographics ==
Cortaillod has a population (as of December 2020) of 4,697. As of 2008, 19.0% of the population are resident foreign nationals. Over the last 10 years (2000–2010 ) the population has changed at a rate of 3.9%. It has changed at a rate of 0.6% due to migration and at a rate of 3.4% due to births and deaths.

Most of the population (as of 2000) speaks French (3,800 or 86.9%) as their first language, German is the second most common (171 or 3.9%) and Italian is the third (122 or 2.8%). There is 1 person who speaks Romansh.

As of 2008, the population was 48.7% male and 51.3% female. The population was made up of 1,734 Swiss men (38.4% of the population) and 466 (10.3%) non-Swiss men. There were 1,956 Swiss women (43.3%) and 362 (8.0%) non-Swiss women. Of the population in the municipality, 935 or about 21.4% were born in Cortaillod and lived there in 2000. There were 1,461 or 33.4% who were born in the same canton, while 917 or 21.0% were born somewhere else in Switzerland, and 997 or 22.8% were born outside of Switzerland.

As of 2000, children and teenagers (0–19 years old) make up 23.4% of the population, while adults (20–64 years old) make up 62.7% and seniors (over 64 years old) make up 13.9%.

As of 2000, there were 1,666 people who were single and never married in the municipality. There were 2,212 married individuals, 236 widows or widowers and 259 individuals who are divorced.

As of 2000, there were 1,851 private households in the municipality, and an average of 2.3 persons per household. There were 599 households that consist of only one person and 93 households with five or more people. In 2000, a total of 1,794 apartments (90.3% of the total) were permanently occupied, while 147 apartments (7.4%) were seasonally occupied and 45 apartments (2.3%) were empty. The vacancy rate for the municipality, in 2010, was 0.19%.

The historical population is given in the following chart:

== Heritage sites of national significance ==
The La Fabrique Neuve and the prehistoric lake shore settlement of Le Petit Cortaillod are listed as Swiss heritage site of national significance. The village of Cortaillod is part of the Inventory of Swiss Heritage Sites.

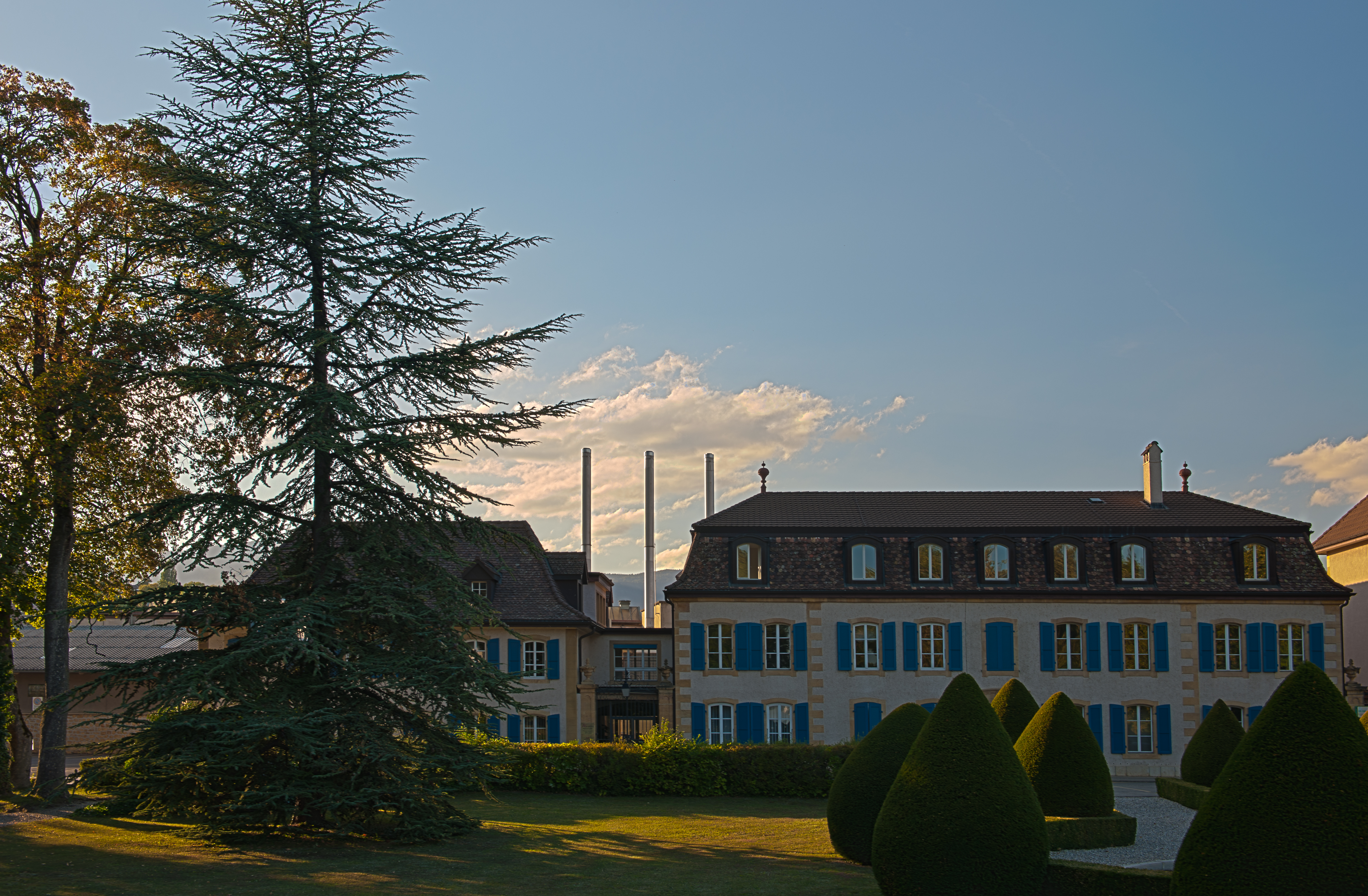
La Fabrique Neuve

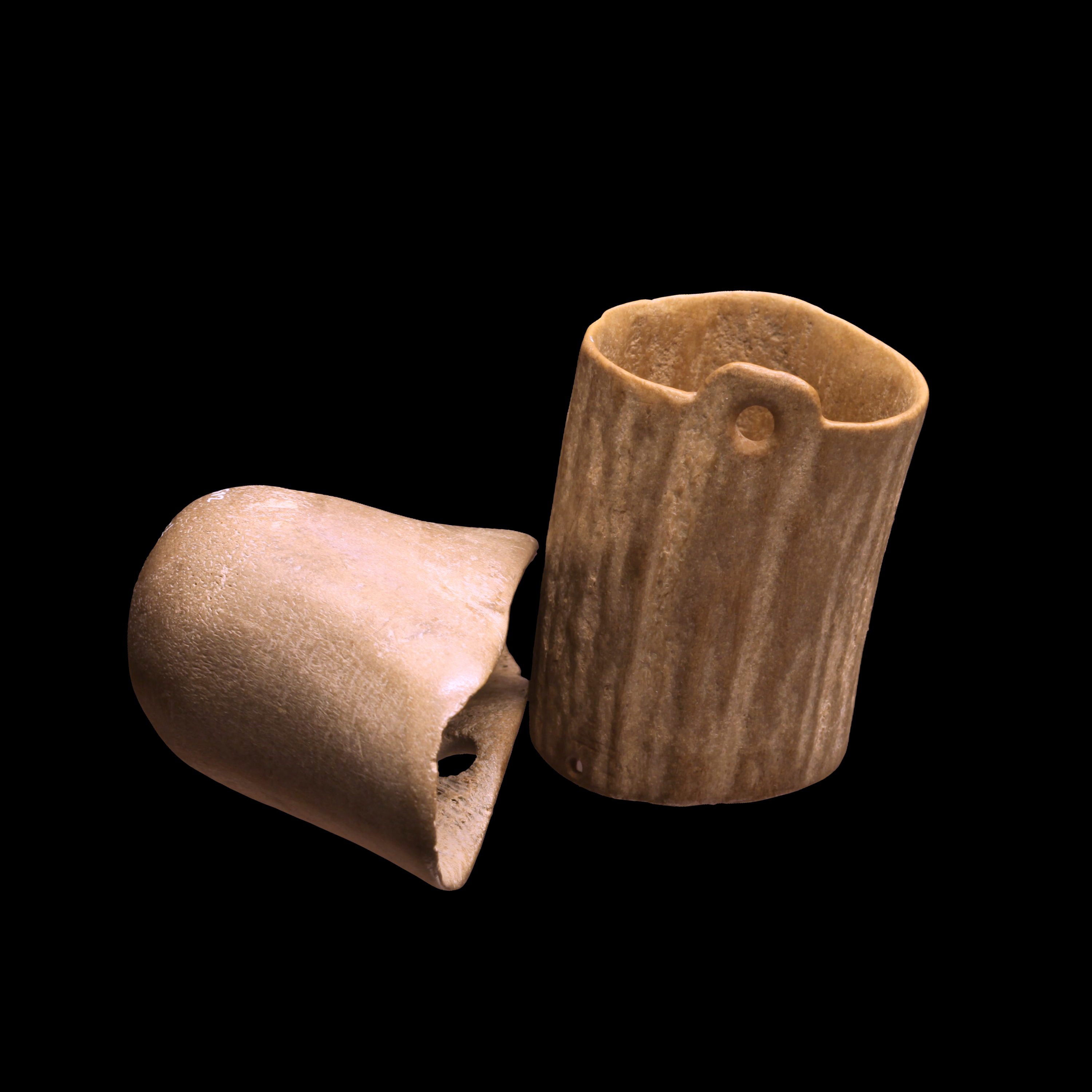
Goblet made from deer antler from Cortaillod

== Politics ==
In the 2007 federal election the most popular party was the SP which received 26.02% of the vote. The next three most popular parties were the SVP (23.46%), the LPS Party (16.01%) and the FDP (14.87%). In the federal election, a total of 1,408 votes were cast, and the voter turnout was 48.8%.

== Economy ==
As of 2010, Cortaillod had an unemployment rate of 4.7%. As of 2008, there were 33 people employed in the primary economic sector and about 12 businesses involved in this sector. 858 people were employed in the secondary sector and there were 27 businesses in this sector. 662 people were employed in the tertiary sector, with 122 businesses in this sector. There were 2,236 residents of the municipality who were employed in some capacity, of which females made up 42.3% of the workforce.

In 2008 the total number of full-time equivalent jobs was 1,407. The number of jobs in the primary sector was 26, of which 23 were in agriculture and 3 were in forestry or lumber production. The number of jobs in the secondary sector was 818 of which 747 or (91.3%) were in manufacturing and 71 (8.7%) were in construction. The number of jobs in the tertiary sector was 563. In the tertiary sector; 231 or 41.0% were in wholesale or retail sales or the repair of motor vehicles, 33 or 5.9% were in the movement and storage of goods, 70 or 12.4% were in a hotel or restaurant, 37 or 6.6% were in the information industry, 4 or 0.7% were the insurance or financial industry, 60 or 10.7% were technical professionals or scientists, 22 or 3.9% were in education and 53 or 9.4% were in health care.

In 2000, there were 1,319 workers who commuted into the municipality and 1,552 workers who commuted away. The municipality is a net exporter of workers, with about 1.2 workers leaving the municipality for every one entering. About 1.7% of the workforce coming into Cortaillod are coming from outside Switzerland. Of the working population, 15.3% used public transportation to get to work, and 63.6% used a private car.

== Religion ==
From the 2000 census, 1,364 or 31.2% were Roman Catholic, while 1,584 or 36.2% belonged to the Swiss Reformed Church. Of the rest of the population, there were 56 members of an Orthodox church (or about 1.28% of the population), there were 5 individuals (or about 0.11% of the population) who belonged to the Christian Catholic Church, and there were 295 individuals (or about 6.75% of the population) who belonged to another Christian church. There were 2 individuals (or about 0.05% of the population) who were Jewish, and 66 (or about 1.51% of the population) who were Islamic. There were 2 individuals who were Buddhist, 1 person who was Hindu and 8 individuals who belonged to another church. 993 (or about 22.71% of the population) belonged to no church, are agnostic or atheist, and 144 individuals (or about 3.29% of the population) did not answer the question.

== Education ==
In Cortaillod about 1,670 or (38.2%) of the population have completed non-mandatory upper secondary education, and 610 or (13.9%) have completed additional higher education (either university or a Fachhochschule). Of the 610 who completed tertiary schooling, 57.5% were Swiss men, 24.6% were Swiss women, 11.1% were non-Swiss men and 6.7% were non-Swiss women.

In the canton of Neuchâtel most municipalities provide two years of non-mandatory kindergarten, followed by five years of mandatory primary education. The next four years of mandatory secondary education is provided at thirteen larger secondary schools, which many students travel out of their home municipality to attend. During the 2010–11 school year, there were 5 kindergarten classes with a total of 94 students in Cortaillod. In the same year, there were 12 primary classes with a total of 236 students.

As of 2000, there were 5 students in Cortaillod who came from another municipality, while 377 residents attended schools outside the municipality.

== Wine ==
Pinot noir from this region is commonly bottled under the Cortaillod label.
