= Banque Bonhôte =

Banque Bonhôte & Cie SA

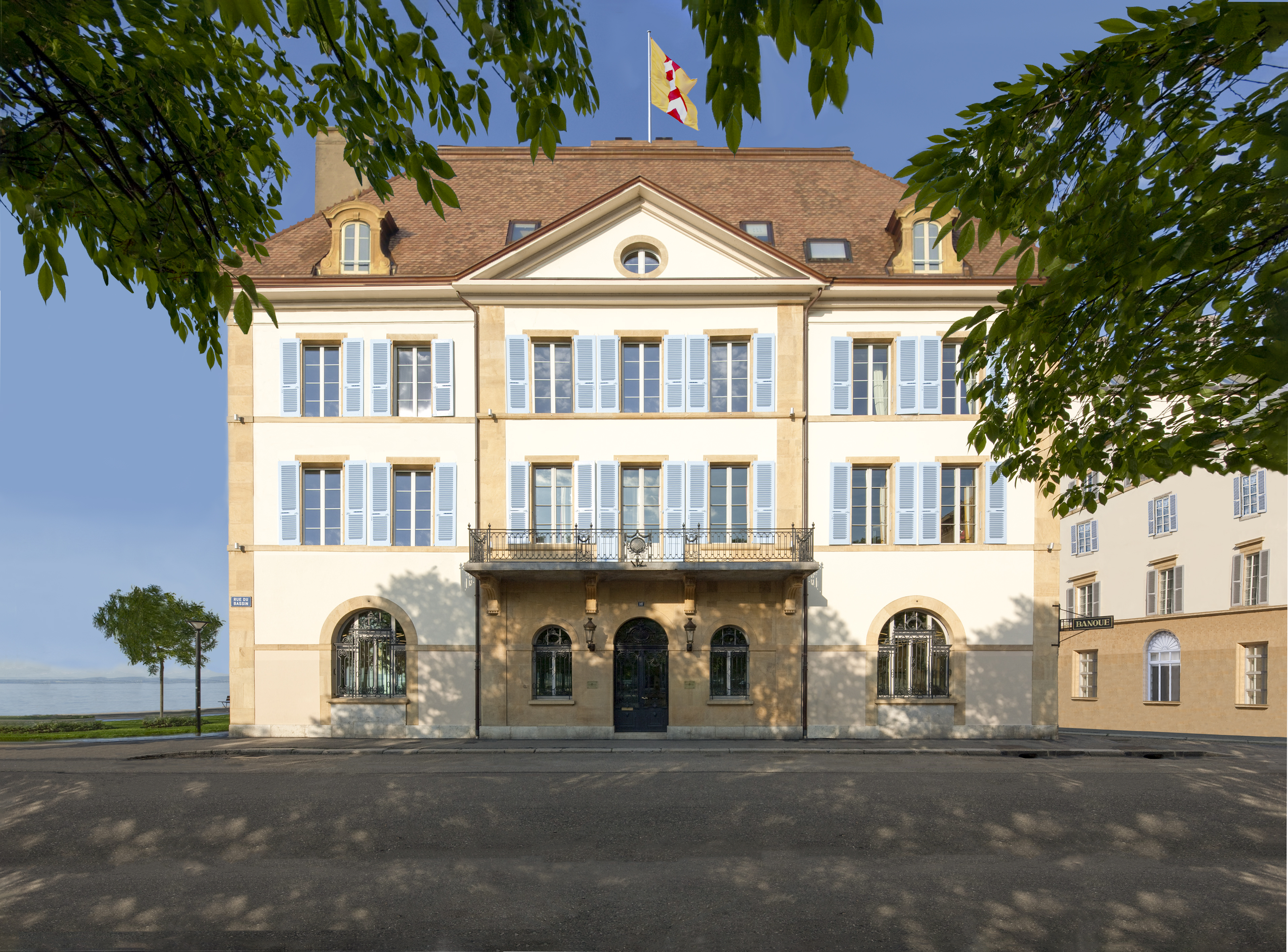
- Company type: Public company
- Industry: Private banking, wealth management, institutional asset managements
- Genre: Private bank
- Founded: 1815
- Headquarters: Neuchâtel, Switzerland
- Number of locations: Neuchâtel, Biel-Bienne, Geneva, Bern, Lausanne, Solothurn, Zurich
- Key people: Jean Berthoud (chair)
- Products: Private banking
- Number of employees: 51–200 employees
- Website: www.bonhote.ch

Banque Bonhôte & Cie is a Swiss private bank founded in 1815 in Neuchâtel. It is active in the wealth and asset management sector.

== History ==
In 1815, Louis-Auguste Petitmaître created the first private bank in Neuchâtel at the age of 18, while the city had only around 4,000 inhabitants. The company initially specialised in metal trading before becoming a real banking institution in the years which followed. Louis-Auguste Petitmaître's bank was taken over by his son Louis-Édouard in 1872, who was previously elected as deputy at the beginning of the 1860s.

In 1895, the latter partnered with Paul Bonhôte, leading to the creation of the Antenen Bonhôte & Cie Bank, which became the Bonhôte & Cie Bank in 1903.

In 1936, Claude Bonhôte took over from his father, maintaining control of the bank's management until 1988. In 1987, he sold the business to the financial holding company Prigest SA.

In 1992, Jean Berthoud and a group of partners repurchased the bank. Jean Berthoud took over the managing of the institution and reintegrated a member of the Bonhôte family to the board of directors. Jean Berthoud came himself from a family which was active in the sector of wealth management in France from the end of the 18th century, with his relative Jonas Berthoud having launched the Berthoud & Son Bank in 1785, which later became the Neuflize OBC bank, which was nationalised from 1981 to 1988.

In 1999, the newspaper Le Temps wrote that "Bonhôte was the latest of twelve investment banks which put Neuchâtel on the map in the 1920s".

From 2004, Bonhôte started to expand, with the opening of several branches in Switzerland. A first one opened in Bienne in 2004, followed by Geneva (2009), Bern (2011), Lausanne (2016), Solothurn and Zürich (2020).

In 2014, Yves de Montmollin took over managing the bank while Jean Berthoud, majority shareholder of the institution, took up the post of president of the board of directors. Jean Berthoud has also sat on the board of directors for the Swiss Bankers Association since 2010. Kim-Andrée Potvin took over as CEO on 1st January 2025.

== Operations ==
The operations of the Bonhôte Group cover a range of services in the wealth and asset management sectors. In wealth management, the Bank's clients are made up of 85% Swiss residents.

The banking services are provided by Bonhôte & Cie SA Bank. These include asset management through a range of UCITS-type investment funds: equity funds, bond funds, hedge funds and property investment funds. The Bonhôte Bank's asset management branch remains mainly known for having launched the Bonhôte-Property fund in 2006, who later took over the funds from Dynamic Real Estate Fund (DREF) making it one of the most significant property funds in the Romandy area.

The advisory services, meanwhile, are provided by three specialist subsidiaries, each enjoying a level of autonomy in its operations:

- Bonhôte Services SA: a subsidiary specialising in legal and financial advice (Swiss and international) for individuals and legal entities.
- BT Swiss Trustee SA: a subsidiary specialising in the administration of trusts.
- Private Client Partners: a division dedicated to huge wealth and based in Zürich.

== Governance ==
In 2017, the Bonhôte Bank was made up of around 100 collaborators, of which 4–5 employees were posted in each of its Swiss Romandie branches. The board of directors has most notably counted among its members the former radical MP Yann Richter and the former Swiss National Bank president Jean Zwahlen at the end of the 1990s, as well as the administrator of the Swiss BNP Paribas and the Union Bancaire Privée around the same time.

In 2021, it bought a German-owned bank Bank Private Client Partners (PCP).
