= Denise Berthoud =

- Born: 27 September 1916; Neuchâtel, Switzerland
- Died: 26 February 2005 (aged 88)
- Education: University of Neuchâtel
- Occupations: Lawyer, actuary, women's rights activist
- Known for: President of Alliance F; President of SAFFA (1958)
- Board member of: Altstadt Compagnie d'Assurances SA (1959–1986)
- Relatives: Louis Perrier (great-uncle)

Denise Berthoud (27 September 1916 – 26 February 2005) was born in Neuchâtel and was the third of Henri Berthoud and Marianne Perrier's five children. She was the sister of Raymonde Berthoud, granddaughter of Jean-Edouard Berthoud, great-niece of Louis Perrier and great-granddaughter of Louis-Daniel Perrier.

In 1942 she finished her studies in law and actuarial science at the University of Neuchâtel. As a lawyer, Berthoud sat at the board of directors of the Swiss insurer Altstadt Compagnie d'Assurances SA between 1959 and 1986.

In 1958 she was associate at the Swiss Association for Women having graduated from Universities (l'Association Suisse des Femmes Diplômées des Universités) and president of the Swiss Exposition for Working Women (SAFFA).

In 1952 she was committee member of the Union of Swiss Women's Societies (today it is known as alliance F) and became its president in 1955 until 1959. She represented the union to the Commercial Policy Federal Commission from 1957 until 1979 and to the council of war.

Between 1958 and 1969 Berthoud was member of the Swiss Red Cross executive committee.

Between 1968 and 1980 she was vice-president of the Forum Helveticum, a platform for discussion of current issues in Swiss public life.

Berthoud was also president of the Swiss Academy of Humanities and Social Sciences and associate at the Swiss Civil Protection.
