= Thomas Henderson (cricketer) =

English cricketer and surgeon

Personal information
- Full name: Thomas Bonhôte Henderson
- Born: 3 January 1875; Paddington, London, England
- Died: 19 April 1920 (aged 45); Harnham, Wiltshire, England
- Batting: Right-handed
- Bowling: Right-arm fast-medium

Domestic team information
- Years: Team
- 1897: Oxford University
- 1899–1901: Marylebone Cricket Club

Career statistics
Competition	First-class
Matches	8
Runs scored	220
Batting average	18.33
100s/50s	–/–
Top score	49
Balls bowled	360
Wickets	7
Bowling average	29.57
5 wickets in innings	–
10 wickets in match	–
Best bowling	3/39
Catches/stumpings	10/–
- Source: Cricinfo, 4 May 2020

Thomas Bonhôte Henderson MRCS FRCS LRCP (3 January 1875 – 19 April 1920) was an English first-class cricketer and surgeon.

The son of John Henderson, he was born at Paddington in January 1875. He was educated at Winchester College, before going up to Trinity College, Oxford. While studying at Oxford, he played first-class cricket for Oxford University in 1897, making five appearances. In addition to playing for the university, he also appeared in one first-class match for an Oxford University Past and Present team against the touring Gentlemen of Philadelphia in the same year. Henderson later played two first-class matches for the Marylebone Cricket Club against Cambridge University in 1899 and Oxford University in 1901. In eight first-class matches, he scored a total of 220 runs at an average of 18.33 and a high score of 49. With his right-arm fast-medium bowling, he took 7 wickets at a bowling average of 29.57 and with best figures of 3 for 39. He was described as a “free and stylish batsman, a fast bowler and a keen fieldsman” by the Wisden Cricketers' Almanack.

After graduating from Oxford in 1901 with a bachelor in medicine, he became a house surgeon and house physician at St Thomas' Hospital. He was both a fellow of the Royal Colleges of Surgeons and the Royal College of Physicians. He married Katharine Emily Smijth-Windham in February 1907, with the couple having one daughter. In the same year he was appointed resident medical officer at Queen Charlotte's and Chelsea Hospital, a post he held until 1909. After, he was a surgical cancer registrar and a clinical assistant at the Hospital for Diseases of the Throat. After, he settled in Salisbury where he was a surgeon at the Salisbury Infirmary. During the First World War, Henderson was the director and surgeon-in-chief of the Hôpital Anglais at Caen in France. Henderson died in April 1920 at Harnham, Wiltshire. His brother was the athlete Walter Henderson.
