= Lycée Jean-Piaget =

School in Neuchâtel, Switzerland

Coordinates: 46.9934°N 6.9406°E

Lycée Jean-Piaget is an institution in Neuchâtel, Switzerland offering secondary education, tertiary education and language education. In 1998, the business school, l'École supérieure de commerce de Neuchâtel, merged with l'École supérieure Numa-Droz to form Lycée Jean-Piaget.
