= Louis Perrier =

Swiss architect and politician (1849–1913)

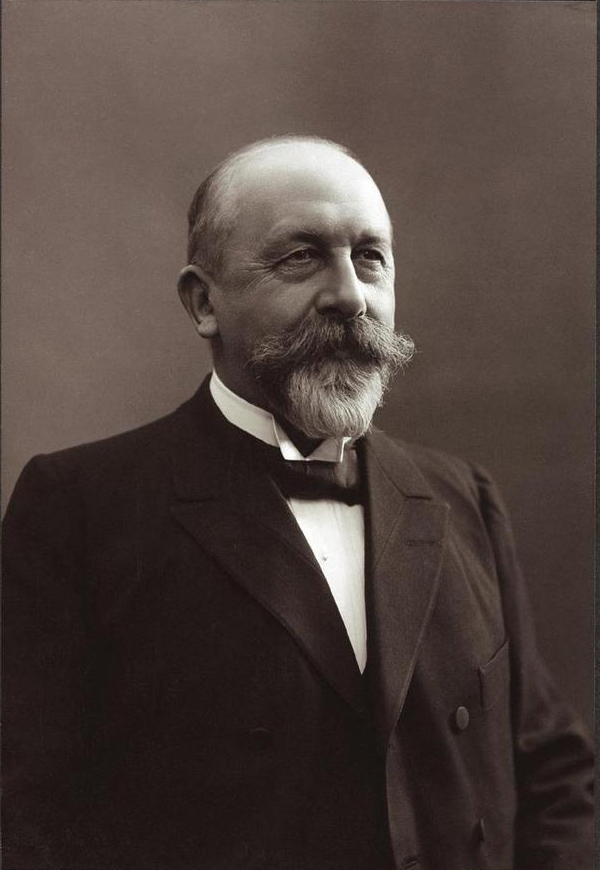
- Perrier c. 1910

Swiss Federal Councillor
- In office 12 March 1912 – 16 May 1913
- Department: Posts and Railways (1912); Home Affairs (1913)
- Preceded by: Robert Comtesse
- Succeeded by: Felix Calonder

Personal details
- Born: Frédéric-François-Louis Perrier; 22 May 1849 Neuchâtel, Switzerland
- Died: 16 May 1913 (aged 63)
- Party: Free Democratic Party
- Education: Swiss Federal Institute of Technology Zurich

Frédéric-François-Louis Perrier (22 May 1849 – 16 May 1913) was a Swiss architect and politician who was a Federal Councillor from 1912 until his death in 1913. As of 2009, he is the member with the shortest time in office (14 months).

== Biography ==
Perrier was born in Neuchâtel, Switzerland. He was the uncle of Denise and Raymonde Berthoud and was the eldest child of architect Louis-Daniel Perrier and Cécile Dardel. At the age of 19, he went to study in Stuttgart, Germany. He obtained his architect degree from the Swiss Federal Institute of Technology Zurich. He first acquired work experience with his father and participating in the construction of the International Bureau of Weights and Measures in Sèvres. After this his real career as an architect began. The University of Neuchâtel and the Hôtel des Postes de La-Chaux-de-Fonds are two among many of his prestigious works.

In 1889 he became a member of the Grand Council of Neuchâtel before becoming a member of the National Council of the Canton of Neuchâtel in 1902. From 1903 to 1912, Perrier was a member of the Conseil d'Etat of the Canton of Neuchâtel (cantonal government). He was affiliated with the Free Democratic Party. He was president of the Conseil d'Etat twice: 1905/1906 and 1909/1910.

He was elected to the Federal Council on 12 March 1912 and died in office the subsequent year on 16 May 1913. During his time in office he held the following departments:

- Department of Posts and Railways (1912)
- Department of Home Affairs (1913)

As a single, Perrier also manage to find the time to pursue an impressive military career. He became colonel in 1896 and between 1902 and 1905, commanded the génie du 1er corps d'armée and the forts de Saint-Maurice troops.

Quai Louis-Perrier in Neuchâtel is named after him.

== Sources ==
- Dictionnaire biographique des cent premiers conseillers fédéraux - Urs Altermatt, 1993 (p. 312-315)
- "Louis Perrier" in German, French and Italian in the online Historical Dictionary of Switzerland.
- Présidences du Conseil d'Etat depuis 1848

Preceded by Robert Comtesse	Member of the Swiss Federal Council; 1912–1913	Succeeded by Felix Calonder
