= Berthaud =

Set index article

Berthaud is a surname. Notable people with that surname include:

- Dominique Berthaud (born 1952), French former footballer and manager
- Fabienne Berthaud (born 1966), French writer, actress, screenwriter, and director
- Lise Berthaud (born 1982), French violist
- Michel Berthaud (1845–1912), French photographer
