= Philippe Suchard =

Swiss chocolatier (1797–1884)

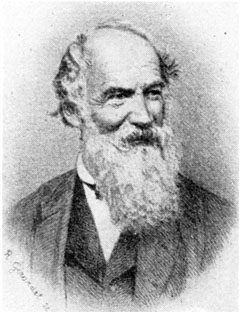
- Born: 9 October 1797; Boudry, Principality of Neuchâtel
- Died: 14 January 1884 (aged 86); Neuchâtel, Switzerland
- Occupation: Chocolatier
- Known for: Founder of Chocolat Suchard

Philippe Suchard (9 October 1797 – 14 January 1884) was a Swiss chocolatier, industrialist and entrepreneur who founded Chocolat Suchard in 1826.

== Early life ==
Suchard was born on 9 October 1797 in Boudry, in the Principality of Neuchâtel (now the Swiss canton of Neuchâtel), to Louise Sophie Dubey and Guillaume Suchard, an innkeeper. He started as an apprentice in his brother Frédéric's Konditorei in Bern around 1803, and was an associate in the business between 1815 and 1823. In 1824, Suchard left Switzerland to visit the United States, later writing a book about his travels, and in 1825 he opened a confectioner's business in Neuchâtel.

== Chocolat Suchard ==
In 1826, Suchard opened the factory of Chocolat Suchard in Serrières, a neighborhood of Neuchâtel. He used hydropower of the nearby river to run the mills in his two-man factory. Suchard used a grinding mill consisting of a heated granite plate, and several granite rollers moving forwards and backwards. This design, the melanger, is still used to grind cocoa paste.

Chocolate was not cheap or a product for everybody. Suchard struggled financially early in his career as a chocolatier. His success came in 1842, with a bulk order from Frederick William IV, king of Prussia, who was also the prince of Neuchâtel. This triggered a boom and soon his chocolates won prizes at the London Great Exhibition of 1851 and the Paris Universal Exposition of 1855. By the end of the 19th century, Suchard had become the largest chocolate producer.

After Philippe's death in 1884 in Neuchâtel, his daughter Eugénie Suchard and her husband Carl Russ-Suchard, took over the functioning of his factory. Carl Russ-Suchard opened the first Suchard factory abroad in 1880 in Lörrach, Germany.

== Other interests ==
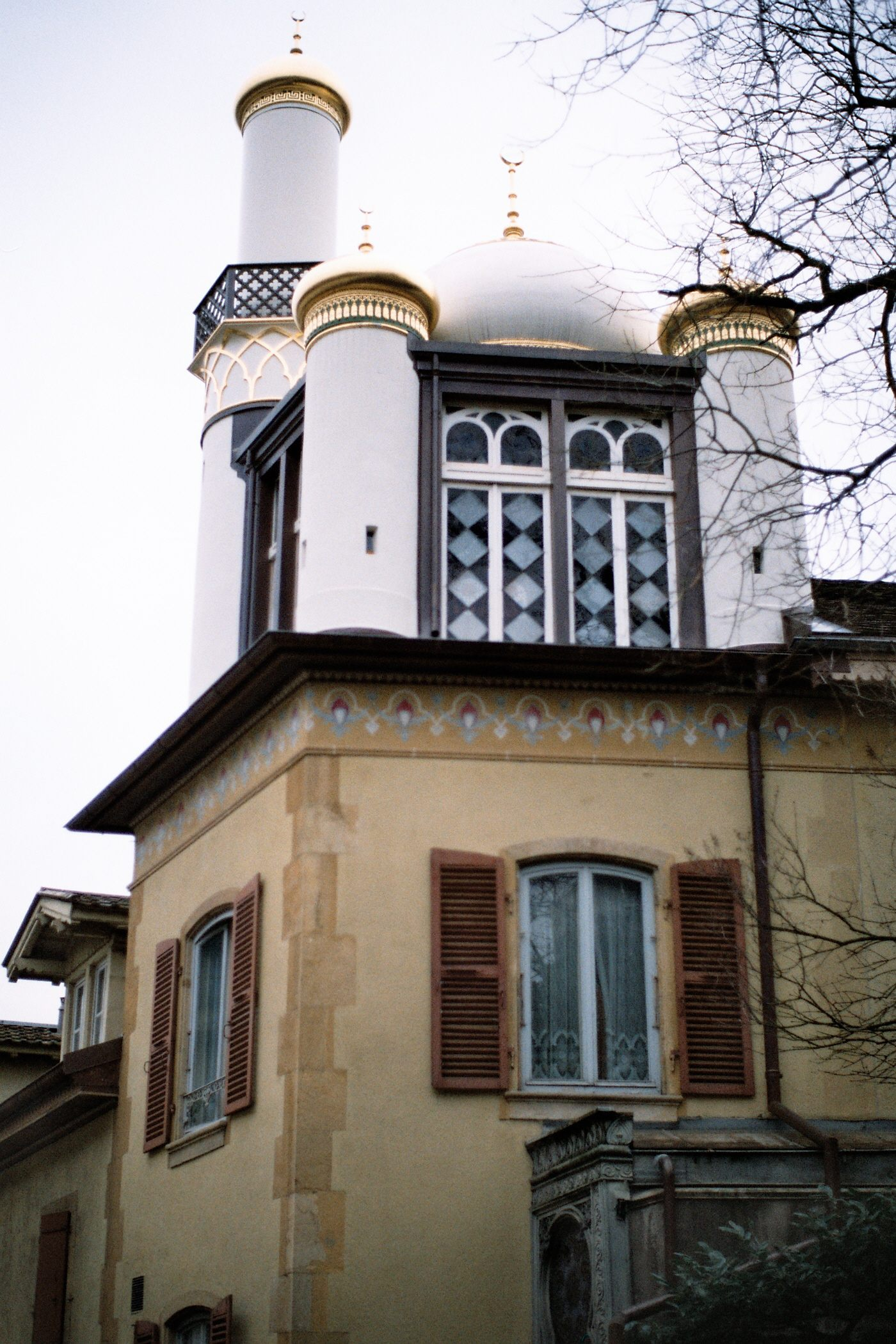
Suchard's house in Neuchâtel built in 1865 by architect Louis-Daniel Perrier, inspired by his trip to the Middle East

Suchard was not only a chocolatier but also had interest in other areas. In 1834, he introduced and captained the first steamer, Industriel, on Lake Neuchâtel. His interest in managing river water and controlling floods led to the sinking of the water level in Lake Neuchâtel. The lowered lake shoreline revealed the Celtic settlement of La Tène dating back to around 450 BC.

He also tried introducing silkworm culture in Switzerland in 1837, but the silkworms were destroyed during an epidemic in 1843. As a result of his travels in the Middle East, he had an addition to his home built, topping it with minarets.

He also invested in the Asphalt Mining Company of Val-de-Travers, La Presta Asphalt Mine (1842–1849).
