= Jean Berthoud =

Swiss banker

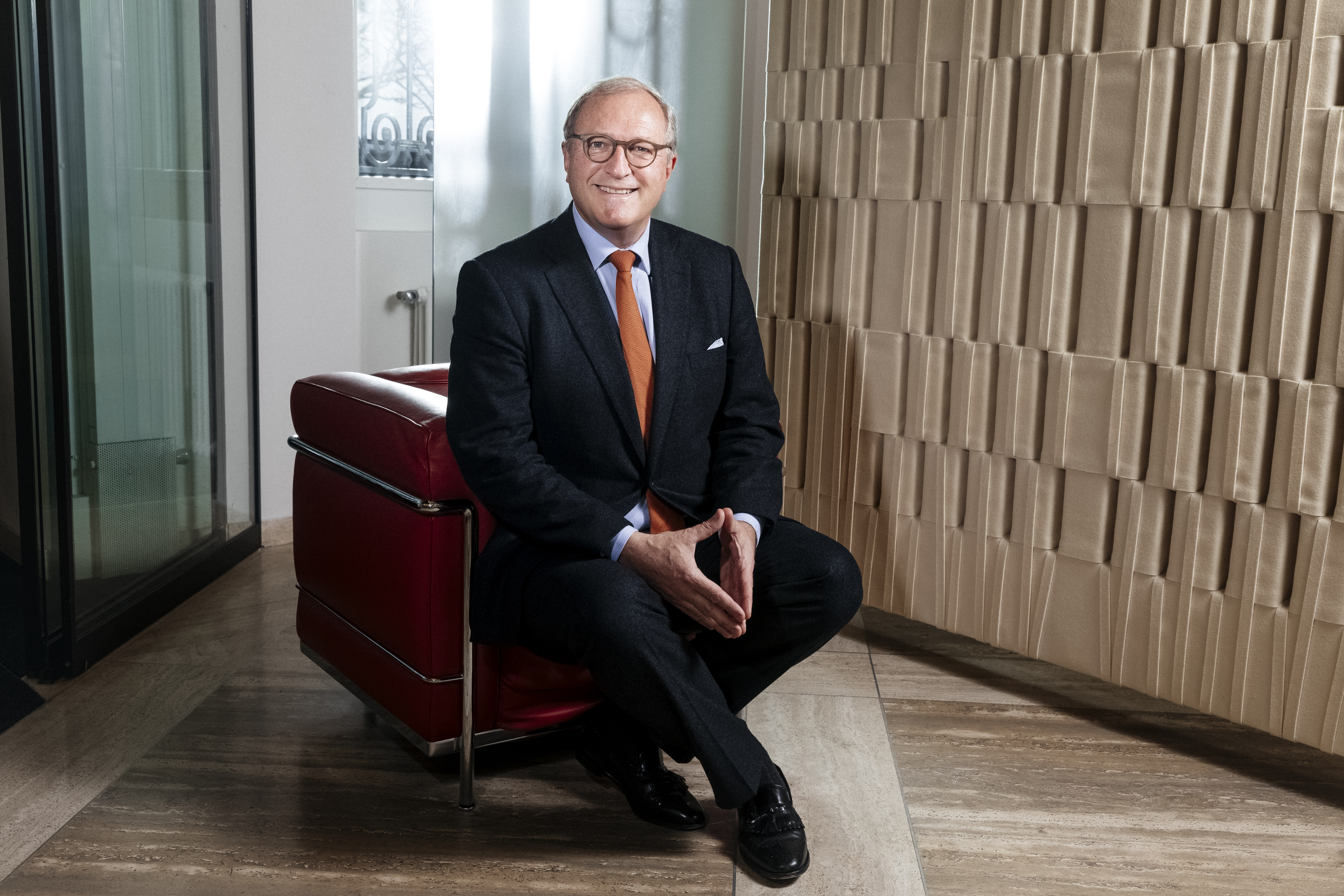
- Born: 1961 (age 64–65); Neuchâtel, Switzerland
- Education: University of Neuchâtel; Columbia Business School
- Occupation: Banker
- Organization(s): Board member, Swiss Bankers Association

Jean Berthoud (born 1961) is a Swiss banker who served as CEO of Bonhôte from 1990 to 2010, and has chaired the bank's board of directors since then. In addition to his role, he has held various other positions, including member of the Sanctions Commission of the Swiss stock exchange, board member of the Swiss Bankers Association, and councilor at the legislative council of the city of Neuchâtel.

== Biography ==
=== Education and Early Career ===
Jean Berthoud was born in 1961 in Neuchâtel, grew up in Paris, and returned to Switzerland to study at the University of Neuchâtel, where he obtained a degree in economics in 1984. He then moved to New York City to attend Columbia Business School, where he earned an MBA in 1986. During his studies, he joined the Sales & Trading department at Salomon Brothers, also in New York.

In 1987, he joined J.P. Morgan, where he held the position of associate director, portfolio manager, and head of international clients in Geneva and Zurich.

=== Career at Bonhôte ===
At the age of 22, Jean Berthoud began looking into acquiring Bonhôte Bank in Neuchâtel, where he was a client. He met with Claude Bonhôte in Paris to present his proposal, but the bank director declined due to Berthoud's young age. In 1988, the bank is sold to Cortaillod Holding. Berthoud approached the new owner to share his vision for the institution, and in 1990 Cortaillod Holding appointed him CEO of the bank at the age of 29. His main objective was to develop and modernize the bank, which was the last private bank in Neuchâtel and had not yet been computerized. An option agreement negotiated upon his appointment allowed him to gradually acquire a stake in the bank until 1992, where together with private investors from Neuchâtel he acquired a majority shareholding from Cortaillod Holding. As the bank's new principal shareholder, he also became president of the Bonhôte Trust companies in Neuchâtel and London.

Berthoud stepped down as CEO in 2010 and to become the bank's chair.

=== Board and Administrative Mandates ===
Alongside his work at Bonhôte Bank, Jean Berthoud has served on several financial bodies, associations, and boards. Since 2006, he has been a member of the Sanctions Commission of SIX Swiss Exchange, the operator of the Swiss stock exchange. In 2010, he was appointed to the board of the Swiss Bankers Association (SBA). In this capacity, he accompanied Federal Councillor Ueli Maurer to Asia in 2017, where they met with the governor of the People's Bank of China. He is also a member of the Swiss Association of Asset Managers. In June 2022, he became Treasurer and Chair of the Audit Committee of the Swiss Bankers Association.

In December 2019, Jean Berthoud joined the International Council of the Preservation Society of Newport County, and in September 2021, he became a board member of the Foundation for the University of Neuchâtel.

He also serves as a board member of the luxury watch company La Montre Hermès, president of the Foundation of the Neuchâtel Society of Economics, member of the Guy de Pourtalès Foundation, and member of the Swiss Charitable Foundation. He has also served on the Council of the University of Neuchâtel.

=== Local Involvement ===
In 1993, Jean Berthoud was elected to the general council of the city of Neuchâtel, where he served for six years as a member of the Swiss Liberal Party. A connoisseur of the history of his hometown and a lover of art, he has repeatedly advocated for the preservation of Neuchâtel's heritage. In his initial meeting with Claude Bonhôte, he expressed his wish that Bonhôte Bank “remain in Neuchâtel hands.” He notably brought back to the city a clock made in 1709 by Abram Pétremand.
