= Indienne =

Type of printed or painted textile

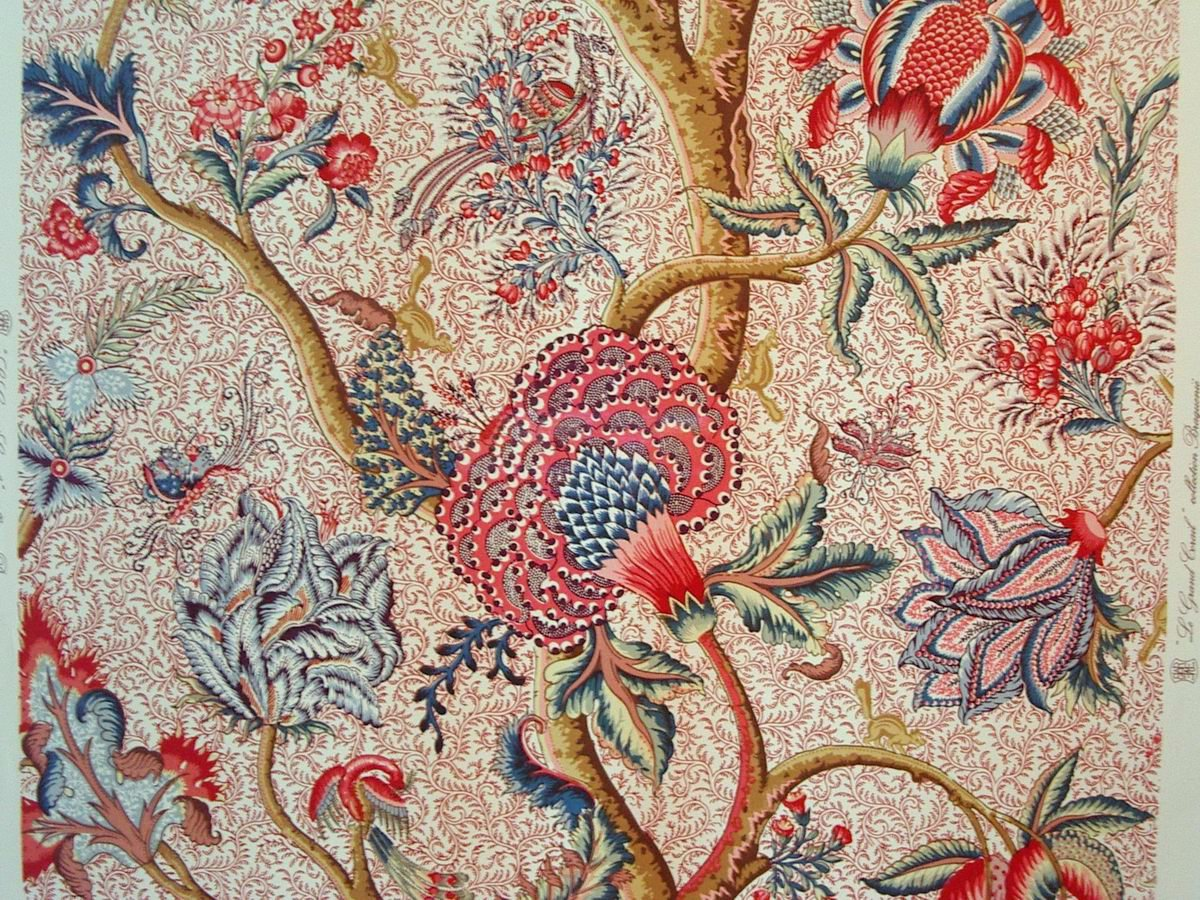
An indienne, a printed or painted textile in the manner of Indian productions.

Indienne (/ˌændiˈɛn/, an-dee-EN; French: [ɛ̃.djɛn], lit. 'that which comes from Eastern India'), was a type of printed or painted textile manufactured in Europe between the 17th and the 19th centuries, inspired by similar textile originally made in India (hence the name). They received various other names in French such as madras, pékin (French for Peking), perse (French for Persia), gougouran, damas, and cirsacs. The original Indian techniques for textile printing involved long and complicated processes necessitating the use of mordants or metallic salts to fix the dyes. The beautiful, vibrant, colors came from the garance plant for red, indigo for blue, and gaude for yellow.

Indiennes were extremely popular, and attempts at import substitution were soon made. In 1640, Armenian merchants introduced Indian textile printing techniques at the port of Marseilles. Later, England (1670) and Holland (1678) would also adopt the technique.

Their importation and production in France was prohibited through a Royal French Ordinance in 1686 in order to protect the local French woolen and silk cloth industries. The indiennes continued to be produced locally despite the heavy prohibition, and were eventually legalized again in 1759. In France, among the main centers for the manufacture of indiennes was Marseille and the Republic of Mulhouse (where DMC was founded).

== See also ==
- Orientalism in early modern France
