= Principality of Neuchâtel =

State in western Europe (1034–1848)

Principality of Neuchâtel Principauté de Neuchâtel (French)
- 1034–1848
- Coat of arms

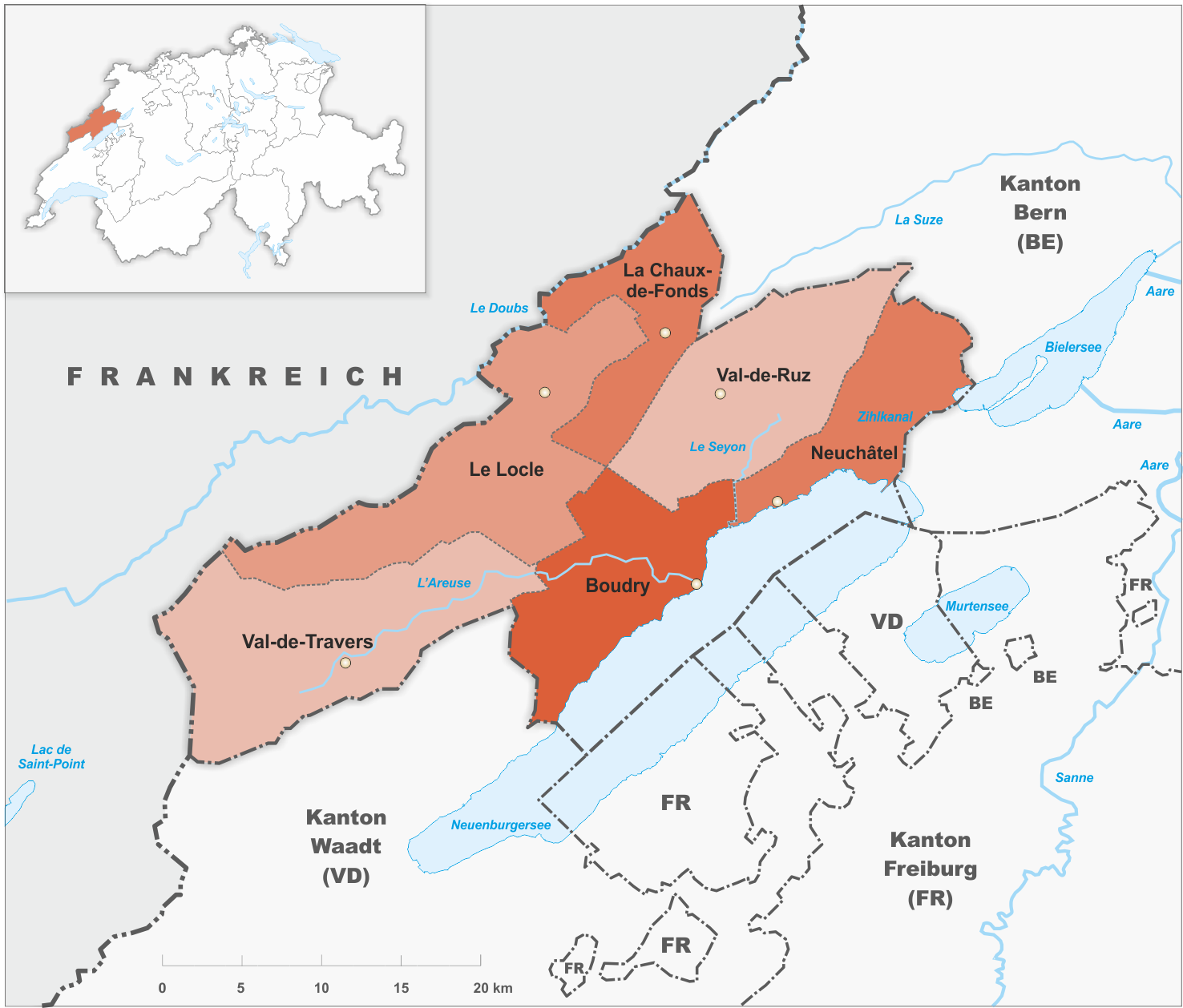
- Location of Neuchâtel in Switzerland
- Status: Swiss associate (until 1798); Swiss canton (1814-1848)
- Capital: Neuchâtel
- Common languages: French
- Religion: Catholic (until 1530); Reformed (from 1530)
- Demonym: Neuchâtelois
- Government: Principality
- Prince
  - 1034–1070 (first): Ulrich I
  - 1840–1848 (last): Frederick William IV
- History
  - Established: 1034
  - Personal union with Prussia: 1707
  - Accession to the Swiss Confederation: 1815
  - Republic proclaimed: 1848
  - Treaty of Paris: 26 May 1857
Preceded by	Succeeded by
Kingdom of Burgundy	Republic and Canton of Neuchâtel

The Principality of Neuchâtel (French: Principauté de Neuchâtel; known as the County of Neuchâtel (Comté de Neuchâtel) until the 17th century) was a state in present-day Switzerland that existed from the 11th century until 1848. It was the predecessor of the modern Republic and Canton of Neuchâtel. Its capital was the city of Neuchâtel.

An associate state of the Old Swiss Confederation, Neuchâtel was allied from the late 13th century to several Swiss cantons and cities, most notably Fribourg (1290), Bern (1308), Solothurn (1369) and Lucerne (1501). Following the extinction of the native House of Neuchâtel in 1395, the county passed into the hands of families from Southern Germany, then to the French House of Orléans-Longueville in the early 16th century. On the death of Marie de Nemours in 1707, the principality was awarded to the royal dynasty of Prussia, the House of Hohenzollern, entering into a personal union with the Kingdom of Prussia. After an interlude during the Napoleonic era (1806–1814), Neuchâtel was restored to the King of Prussia and admitted as a full member of the Swiss Confederation, a unique dual status confirmed at the Congress of Vienna in 1815. It maintained its status as both a principality and a canton until the republican revolution of 1848, which led to the foundation of the present-day canton of Neuchâtel.

== History ==
=== Origins ===
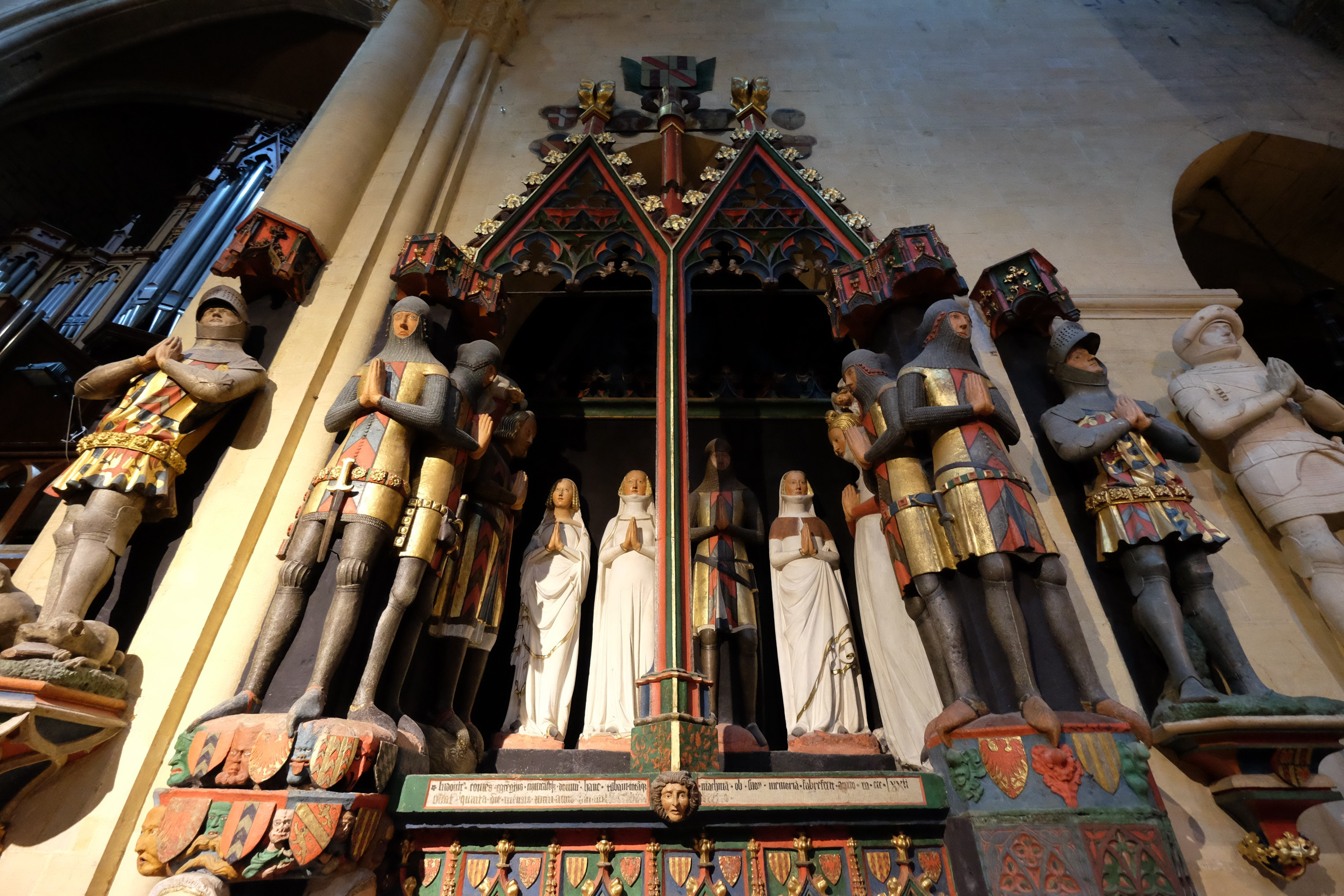
Cenotaph of the counts and countesses of Neuchâtel at the collegiate church, commissioned in 1372 by Count Louis I of Neuchâtel

The origins of the Principality date back to the time of King Rudolph III of Burgundy. The construction of a "new castle" (Latin: novum castellum, from which the French name derives), situated on top of a hill overlooking the lake, is recorded in 1011. When Rudolph died without heirs in 1032, Neuchâtel was listed as one of his possessions, which Emperor Conrad II eventually incorporated into the Holy Roman Empire. In 1034, Conrad II entrusted the territory to Ulrich of Fenis from the House of Neuchâtel, a family of obscure origins, converting it into the County of Neuchâtel. His aim was to prevent the advance of Odo II, Count of Blois, an enemy of the emperor. The county's donation was confirmed in 1046 by Conrad II's successor, Emperor Henry III. The city of Neuchâtel, which had been destroyed during the fighting of 1033, was then rebuilt.

In 1395, the last sovereign from the House of Neuchâtel, Elisabeth, Countess of Neuchâtel, died without heirs, having in her will named Conrad IV of Freiburg as her successor. It was during this period that Neuchâtel established relations with neighboring states that were beginning to form the Old Swiss Confederation: the county first entered into a union with Fribourg then formed an alliance with Bern, one of the most powerful Swiss cantons, in 1406. Conrad IV's son and successor, John of Freiburg, died without heirs in 1457, leading to a succession crisis. A dispute ensued between Louis II of Chalon-Arlay (John's brother-in-law) and Rudolf IV of Hachberg-Sausenberg (John's relative), with the latter emerging as the new Count of Neuchâtel. Rudolf's son, Philip of Hachberg-Sausenberg, married Marie of Savoy, a maternal granddaughter of King Louis XI of France, beginning an alliance that allowed for a long period of stability.

=== Orléans-Longueville period (1504-1707) ===
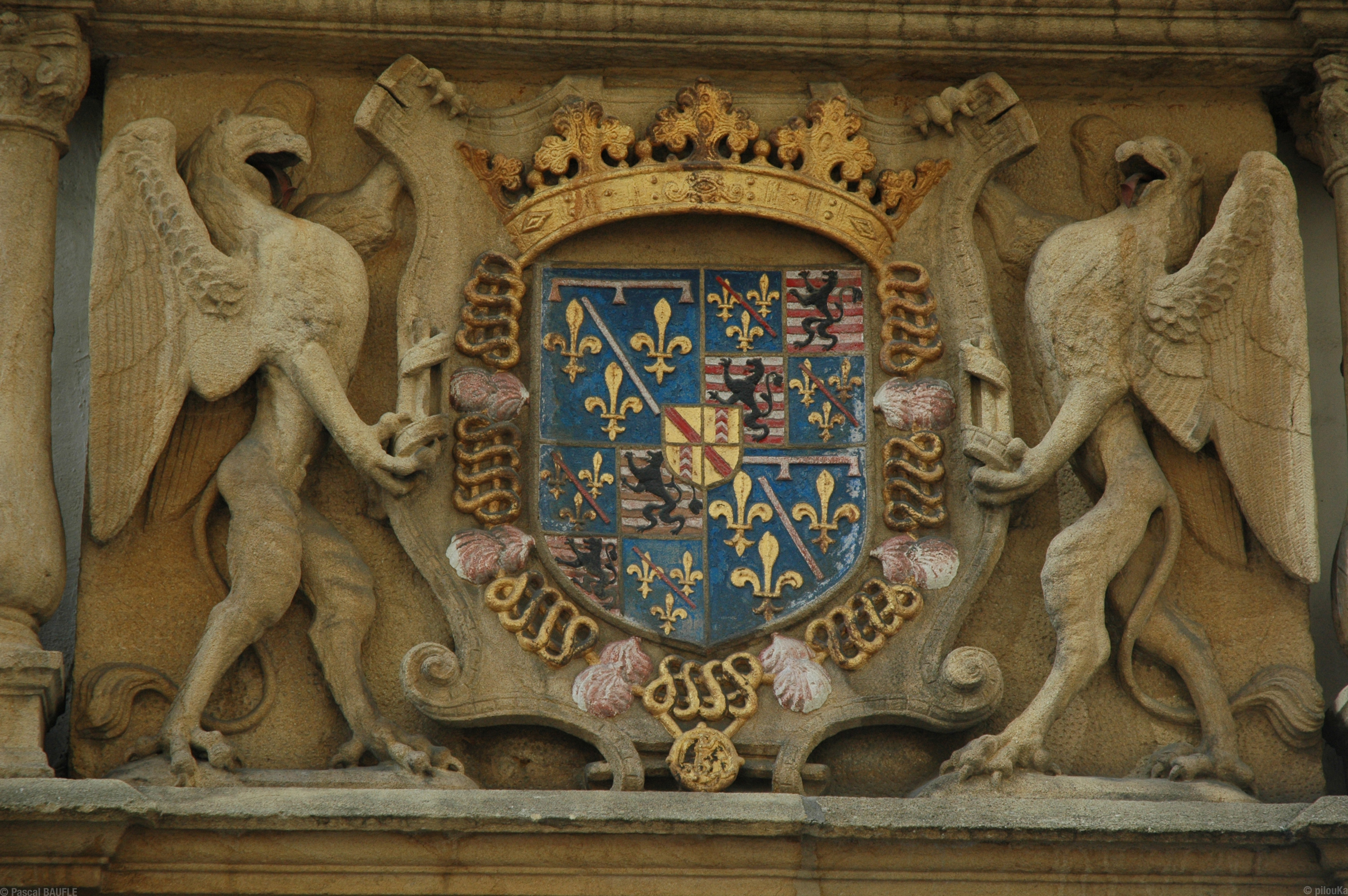
Coat of arms of the dukes of Orléans-Longueville and princes of NeuchÂtel, on the Maison des Halles at Neuchâtel

Philip died in 1503 and was succeeded by his only daughter, Jeanne of Hachberg-Sausenberg, who married the following year Louis I d'Orléans, Duke of Longueville, a French prince du sang and descendant of Jean de Dunois. The proximity of such an obvious French presence led the Swiss cantons to preemptively occupy the county during the Italian Wars and administer it as a common bailiwick from 1512 to 1529. Reinstated in her lands thanks in particular to King Francis I of France, Jeanne could not prevent her subjects from adopting the Protestant Reformation; her poor management of finances also forced her to lease to the bourgeois of Neuchâtel the greater part of the revenues of her county, which she even considered selling to the canton of Fribourg. It was only at the end of the 16th century, thanks to the successful regency of Marie de Bourbon, that the risk for the Orléans-Longueville of seeing Neuchâtel become a city-state disappeared.

Beginning in 1529, the House of Orléans-Longueville administered the county through a governor, who was generally selected from the patrician families of Fribourg or Solothurn, and was thus of Catholic faith. The sovereign formed around the governor a council which, in 1580, took the name of Council of State (Conseil d'État), an advisory, administrative and judicial body, particularly active in the prevention of disputes and the arbitration of conflicts. The Council of State was made up of a variable (from 2 to 14) but limited number of magistrates, mostly consisting of judicial and financial officials, who were appointed for life and chosen from bourgeois families of Neuchâtel, or more rarely of Boudry or Le Landeron. This institution notably survived the 1848 revolution, when it took its current form as the Council of State of the Canton of Neuchâtel.

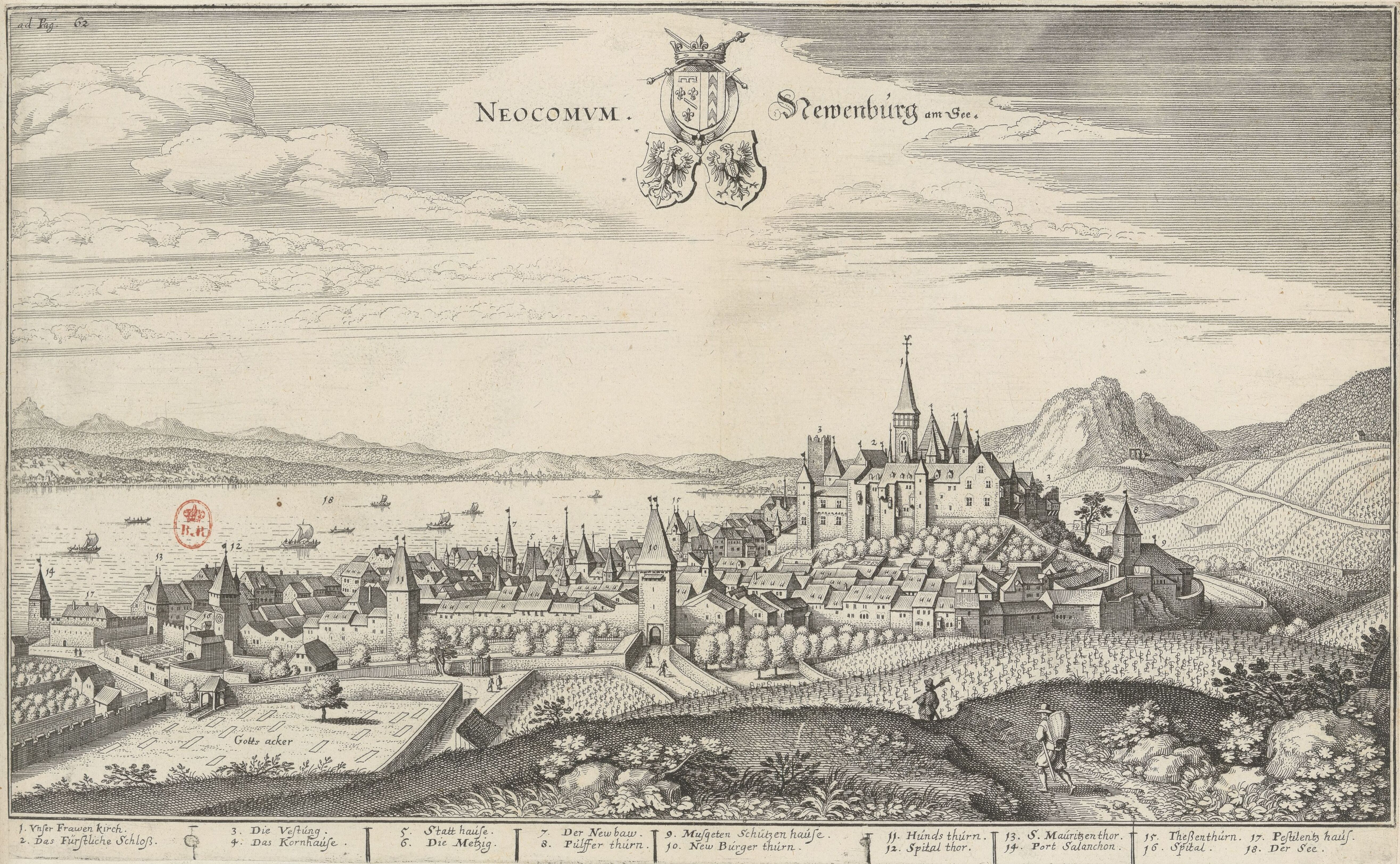
Engraving of the city of Neuchâtel by Matthäus Merian the Elder (c. 1654)

In 1571, the Count of Neuchâtel, Léonor d'Orléans, took the title of "Sovereign Count of Neuchâtel in Switzerland". Henry II took the title of "by the grace of God, Prince and Sovereign Lord of the Counties of Neufchastel and Vallangin" in 1618. The rule of the Orléans-Longueville dynasty, often overshadowed by the subsequent period of Prussian rule, is nonetheless a period of formation of territorial unity, establishment of a strong political authority, administrative reforms and the abolition of the obligation to pay the taille (1634), which remained in scattered locations. The period also saw the elevation of civil and military officers of bourgeois origin to the nobility, as well as the establishment of a clear distinction between civil and religious authorities, in accordance with the situation of a Protestant principality ruled by a Catholic prince, a rare exception in Europe to the principle of cujus regio, ejus religio.

In the 16th and early 17th centuries, Neuchâtel was most often under the authority of women, notably Marie de Bourbon, who exercised the regency during the minority of her son Henry I. The most prominent prince from Orléans-Longueville dynasty, Henry II, left two male heirs on his death in 1663: the eldest Jean Louis Charles abdicated in favor of the younger Charles Paris in 1668. Charles Paris died childless in 1672 and was succeeded as prince by Jean Louis Charles, beginning a troubled period between the claimants to the principality, first between Marie de Nemours, Henry II's daughter from his first marriage, and Anne Geneviève de Bourbon, mother and guardian of the mentally ill Jean Louis Charles, then, after the latter's death (1694), between Marie de Nemours and François Louis, Prince of Conti (cousin of Jean Louis Charles). The succession of Neuchâtel therefore became an issue long before the death, on 15 June 1707, of Marie de Nemours, the last member of the House of Orléans-Longueville at the head of the principality.

=== Succession crisis ===
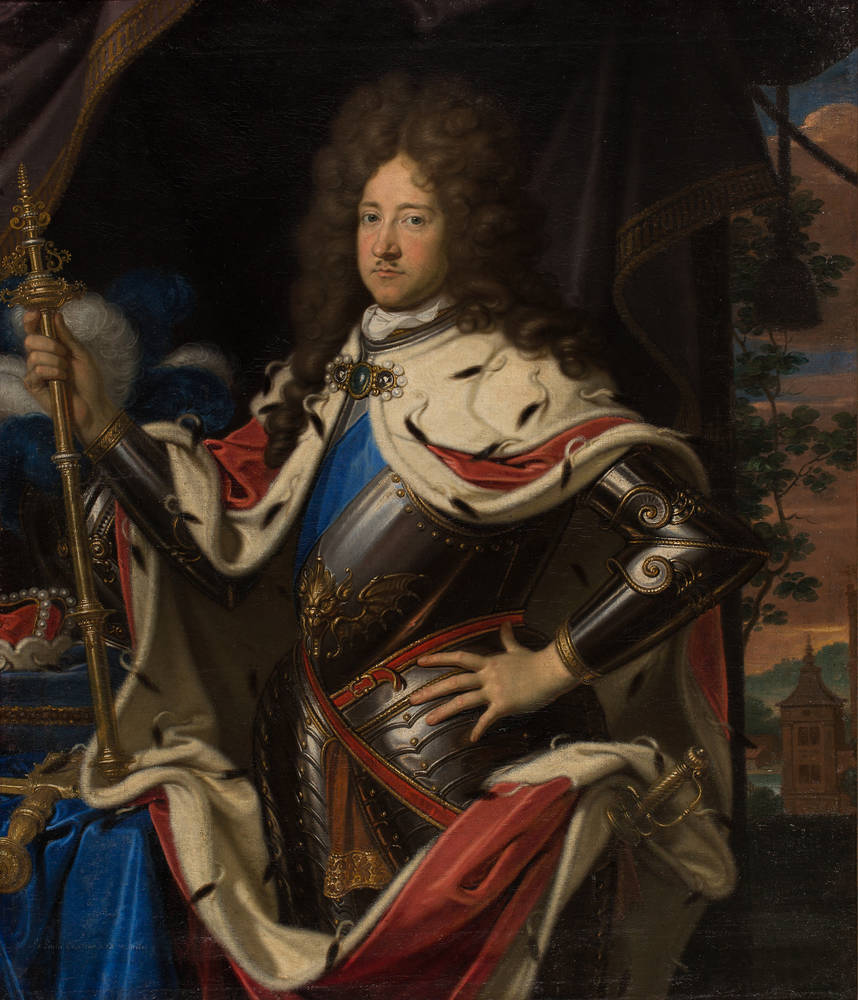
King Frederick I of Prussia, the first Prince of Neuchâtel from the House of Hohenzollern (portrait by Gedeon Romandon, c. 1690)

The death of Marie de Nemours caused a profound upheaval in the principality, and her succession became a European affair. Neuchâtel's sovereign tribunal of the Three Estates, which had chosen Marie as sovereign in 1694, was tasked with the designation of her successor. During the summer of 1707, nineteen heirs presumptive defended their cases before the twelve judges constituting the tribunal. Nine claimants were ultimately admitted to the trial, all of whom had testamentary or hereditary rights to the succession of the Orléans-Longueville or to the inheritance of the House of Chalon.

Still affected by the Revocation of the Edict of Nantes in 1685, the Neuchâtel judges rejected all influence of Catholic France by designating King Frederick I of Prussia as Prince of Neuchâtel on 3 November 1707. This decision provoked strong reactions in France and, in early 1708, Louis XIV of France considered an invasion of the principality by his garrisons in Franche-Comté. Neuchâtel's Swiss allies mobilized, but the hazards of European politics led Louis to abandon this occupation project. In 1713, by the Treaty of Utrecht, the great powers sanctioned the passage of Neuchâtel into the possession of the House of Hohenzollern. Afterwards, of the three Catholic cantons allied with Neuchâtel, only Solothurn accepted a renewal of their alliance in 1756. No alliance between Neuchâtel and the Swiss cantons would be formed or renewed after this date.

=== First Prussian period (1707-1806) ===
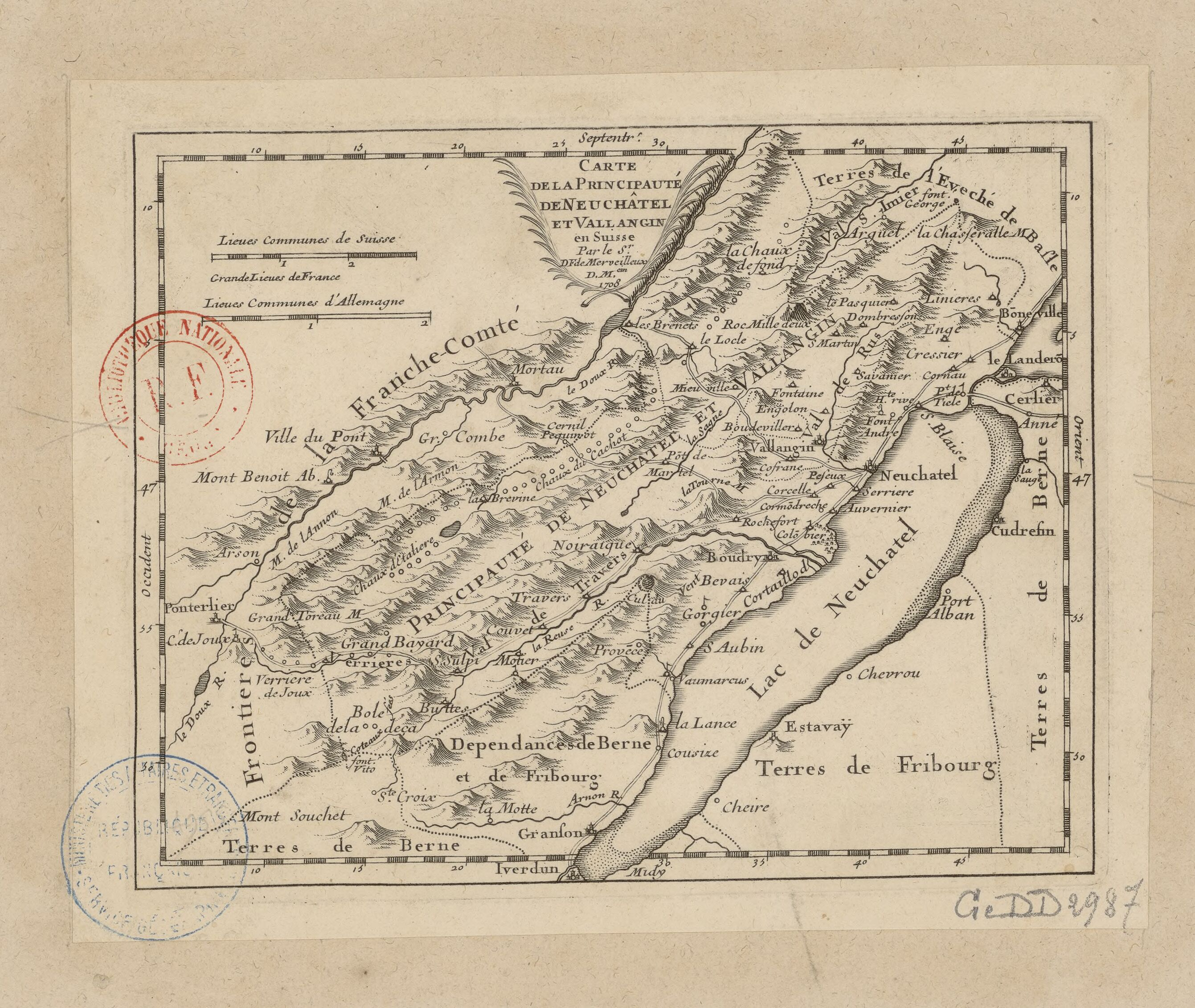
Map of the Principality of Neuchâtel and Valangin, by David-François de Merveilleux (1708)

As a Calvinist himself, the King of Prussia reassured the people of Neuchâtel about their religion and also granted them the right to be governed only by natives. Only the prince's representative, the governor, was a foreigner, but he was from then on of the Reformed faith. Thus began a long period of peace that favored the development of commerce and local industries in Neuchâtel. Apart from an interregnum during the Napoleonic Wars from 1806 to 1814, six kings of Prussia would reign as Prince of Neuchâtel until 1848, in a regime of personal union.

Overall, the Hohenzollerns, focusing on the consolidation of the Kingdom of Prussia (created in 1701), attached little political interest to their distant Principality of Neuchâtel, leaving the local aristocracy with the privilege of conducting affairs and thus offering them the opportunity to increase their influence over the territory and its people. This disinterest on the part of the princes, combined with the presence of foreign governors with little attachment to the land, notably stimulated the pro-Swiss attitude of certain Neuchâtel elites.

Even though he was only a transitional prince, Frederick I proved attentive to the well-being of his subjects, while his successor, Frederick William I, through a conciliatory policy, focused primarily on preventing internal issues of his principality from disrupting Prussia's rise. Frederick II, on the other hand, was petty, quarrelsome, and self-interested toward the principality; his enlightened despotism did not seem to extend to Neuchâtel. By seeking to increase his revenues by imposing a tax lease (a system in force since 1748), he provoked a popular uprising that culminated in the brutal assassination of Attorney General Claude Gaudot in 1768, in what became known as the Gaudot Affair. Nevertheless, Frederick II supported the efforts of Neuchâtel industrialists by guaranteeing them the privileges enshrined in the General Articles.

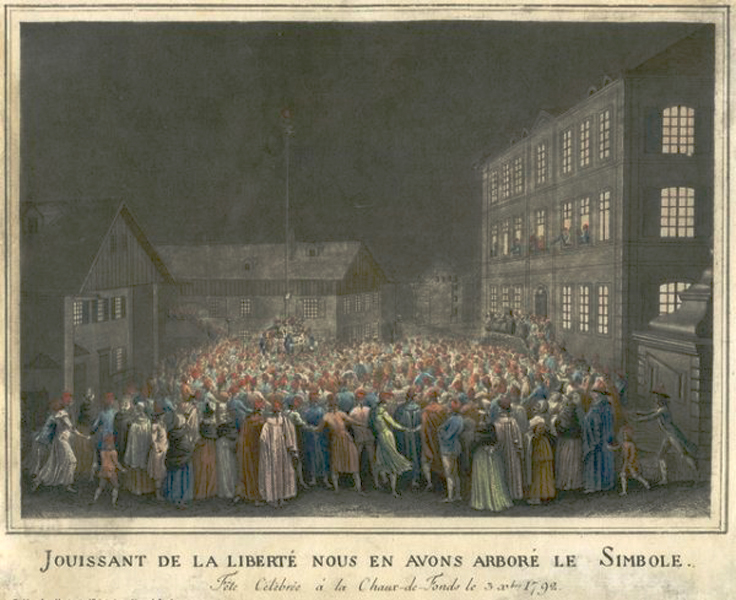
Celebration around a liberty tree at La Chaux-de-Fonds, 1792 (engraving by Alexandre Girardet)

The reign of Frederick William II was marked by the wars against Revolutionary France, which had little effect on Neuchâtel. Unlike the neighboring Prince-Bishopric of Basel, Neuchâtel was not subject to French invasion, as the Revolutionary authorities, who sought to keep the 1795 Peace of Basel with Prussia, had no interest in the territory. The French Revolution found supporters in the principality, mainly in the mountainous areas. Sympathies were expressed as early as 1791, liberty trees were planted in 1792 and 1793, and unrest broke out. The government, which succeeded in dividing the movement, eventually restored order. This nonetheless constituted the first challenge to the foundations of the ancien régime in Neuchâtel. The year 1798, however, does not represent a turning point in the history of Neuchâtel, which was neither incorporated into the Helvetic Republic nor annexed by the French First Republic, unlike most of modern Switzerland.

=== Napoleonic period (1806-1814) ===
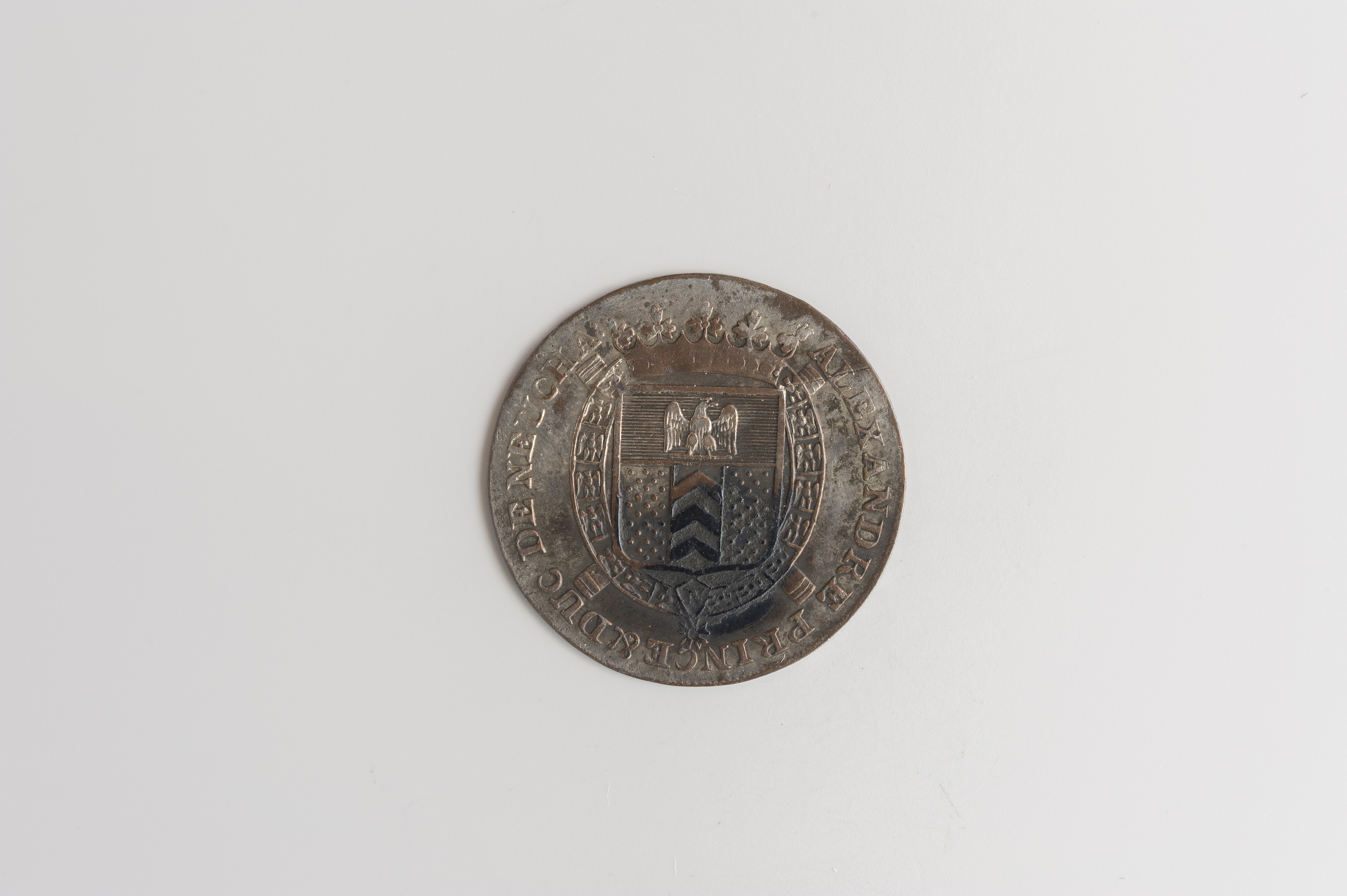
1 batz of the Principality of Neuchâtel minted during Louis-Alexandre Berthier's rule (1806–1814). The escutheon combines the coat of arms of Neuchâtel with the Napoleonic aquila.

On 15 December 1805, following his victory at the Battle of Austerlitz, French emperor Napoleon signed the Treaty of Schönbrunn with King Frederick William III of Prussia, by which he ceded Hanover (which he had conquered in 1803) to Prussia in exchange for scattered Hohenzollern possessions, including the Principality of Neuchâtel. He offered the territory to one of his most effective officers, Marshal Louis-Alexandre Berthier, France's Minister of War and Napoleon's long-time chief of staff, on 28 February 1806. In March 1806, Marshal Nicolas Oudinot occupied the Principality and Berthier assumed the title of Prince of Neuchâtel and Duke of Valangin.

Like previous princes, Berthier, who never came to Neuchâtel, managed his principality through the Council of State and a highly successful governor, François Victor Jean de Lesperut. Yet, from afar, the marshal dictated the broad outlines of Napoleonic reforms, which included improving roads, reforming judicial structures, and modernizing agriculture by abolishing old duties and taxes. Berthier reorganized the postal service and the gendarmerie, but failed in his dream of unifying the laws. He also authorized the public celebration of Mass at the collegiate church of Neuchâtel.

Austrian troops occupied the Principality of Neuchâtel in December 1813, amid the War of the Sixth Coalition, and Berthier abdicated on 3 June 1814 following Napoleon's abdication as emperor. Those who had expected him to truly modernize Neuchâtel were disappointed, while the existing power holders who had to submit to his authority did not welcome his rule. A transitional regime between two eras, Berthier's rule was too short to leave a lasting impact in the history of Neuchâtel. He did, however, outline some paths toward the model of a more dynamic state, with greater concern for the well-being of its inhabitants.

=== Second Prussian period (1814-1848) ===
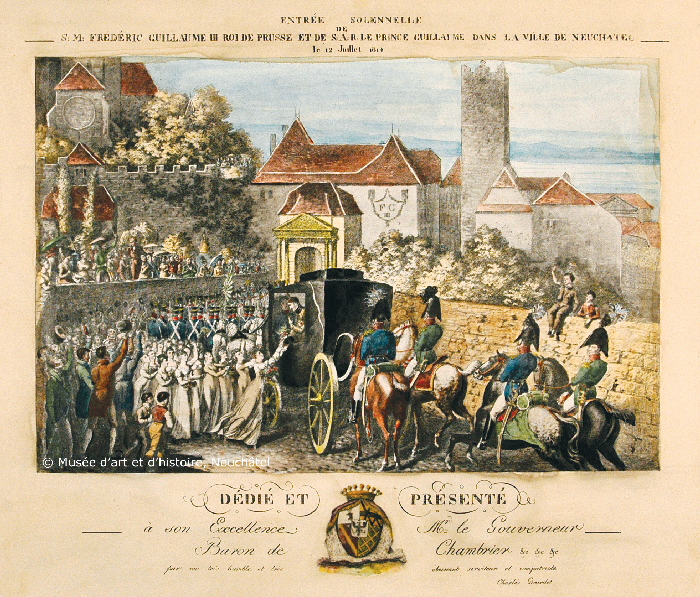
Frederick William III of Prussia entering the city of Neuchâtel on 12 July 1814, accompanied by his second son, the future German Emperor Wilhelm I (engraving by Charles Samuel Girardet, 1814)

By ceding the principality to Napoleon in 1806, Frederick William III had alienated some of his former subjects. When he recovered Neuchâtel in 1814, the territory was no longer the same: supporters of rapprochement with Switzerland, including Attorney General Georges de Rougemont, became increasingly active, and on 12 September 1814 obtained the Swiss Federal Diet's acceptance of Neuchâtel as the twenty-first canton.

Besides ratifying the principality's entry into the Confederation as a canton, the Neuchâtel authorities expected the Congress of Vienna to increase its territory by adding the lordship of Erguël, the former bailiwick of Grandson, and the strip of land south of the Doubs between the Fort de Joux and Les Brenets. All of these territorial claims were rejected, though Neuchâtel ultimately received Le Cerneux-Péquignot and the entire freehold of Lignières. Politically, it inherited an uneasy compromise. By restoring the Hohenzollern dynasty to the head of the principality while sanctioning its status as a sovereign canton—a dual status that made Neuchâtel unique in Switzerland—the Great Powers created an ambiguous situation that would largely determine Neuchâtel's future.

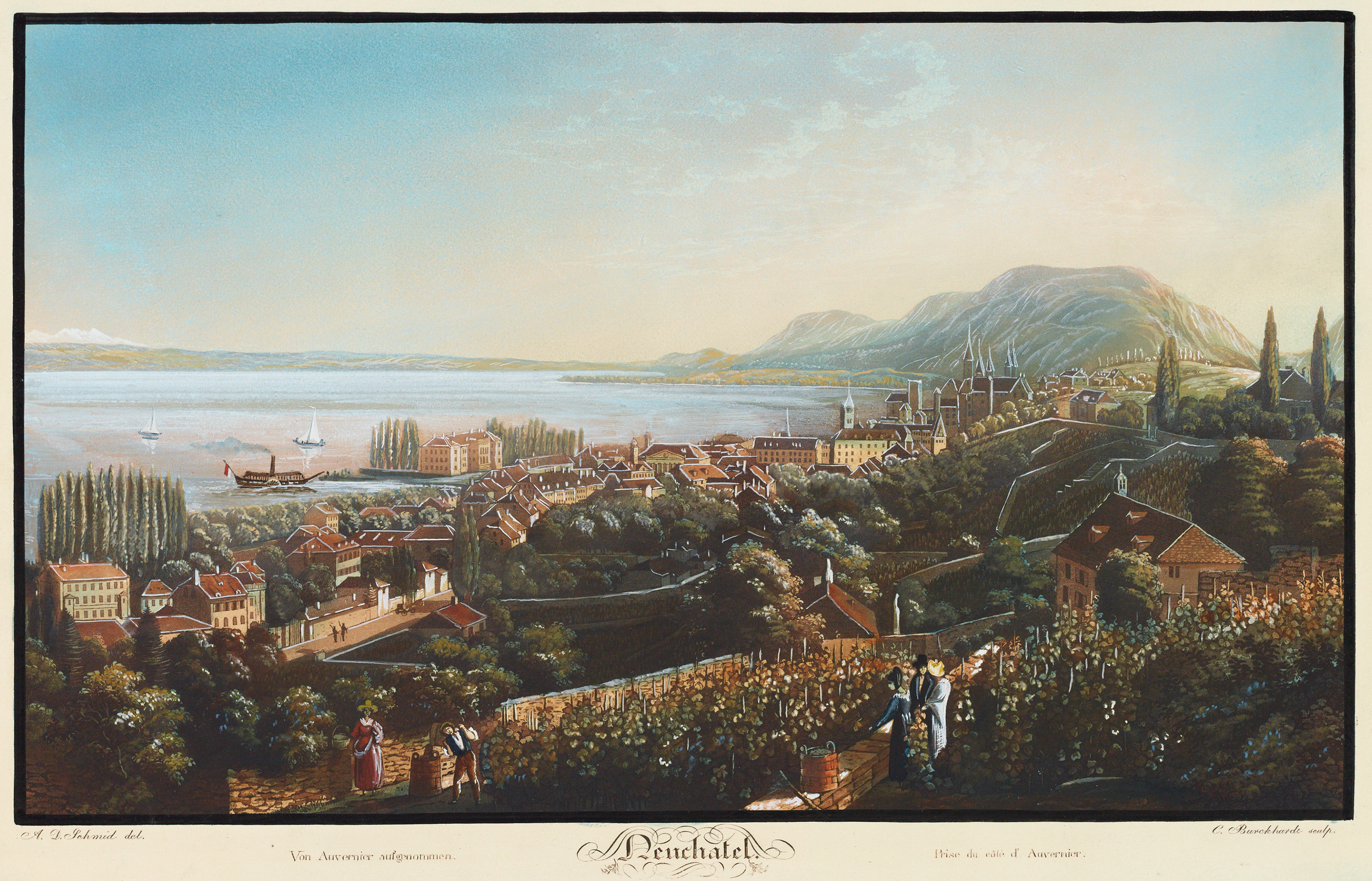
Aquatint view of the city of Neuchâtel by Johann Baptist Isenring (1831)

Without much conviction, the king created the General Audiences, the first project of a parliament for Neuchâtel, of which he appointed the majority of members. The July Revolution of 1830 in France caused some unrest in the principality. In 1831, Frederick William III replaced the General Audiences with a Legislative Body, elected by census suffrage, the beginning of a separation of powers. However, the frustration of Neuchâtel democrats persisted, culminating in an insurrection in 1831 led by Alphonse Bourquin. The revolt, which forced the authorities to call on Swiss federal mediation, was finally quelled and its leaders severely punished. The abolition of certain privileges and a visit by Frederick William IV in 1842 attempted to create an illusion of popularity for the regime, but ever-stronger ties were being forged between part of the local elite and the Swiss political class.

The Neuchâtel militias were subject to federal military regulations, and Neuchâtel kept an elite contingent and a reserve, numbering nearly 2,000 men, at the disposal of the Confederation. Federal exercises and inspections, officer schools, as well as federal festivities with a strong patriotic character contributed to the growth of the republican movement in Neuchâtel. From 1832, the authorities of the principality were increasingly suspicious of Switzerland, where radicals triumphed in elections in several cantons. Neuchâtel joined other conservative cantons in the League of Sarnen in 1832, and unsuccessfully petitioned the prince to dissolve the bond with Switzerland. This uneasiness culminated at the time of the Sonderbund War: Neuchâtel further discredited itself before the future victors by declaring itself neutral, the only Protestant canton other than Basel-Stadt to do so. With the exception of aristocratic families, whose political or material interests tied them to a system inherited from the feudal era, an increasing number of people in Neuchâtel, particularly in the mountains and the Val-de-Travers, aspired to the construction of an authentic Swiss canton.

=== Revolution of 1848 and aftermath ===
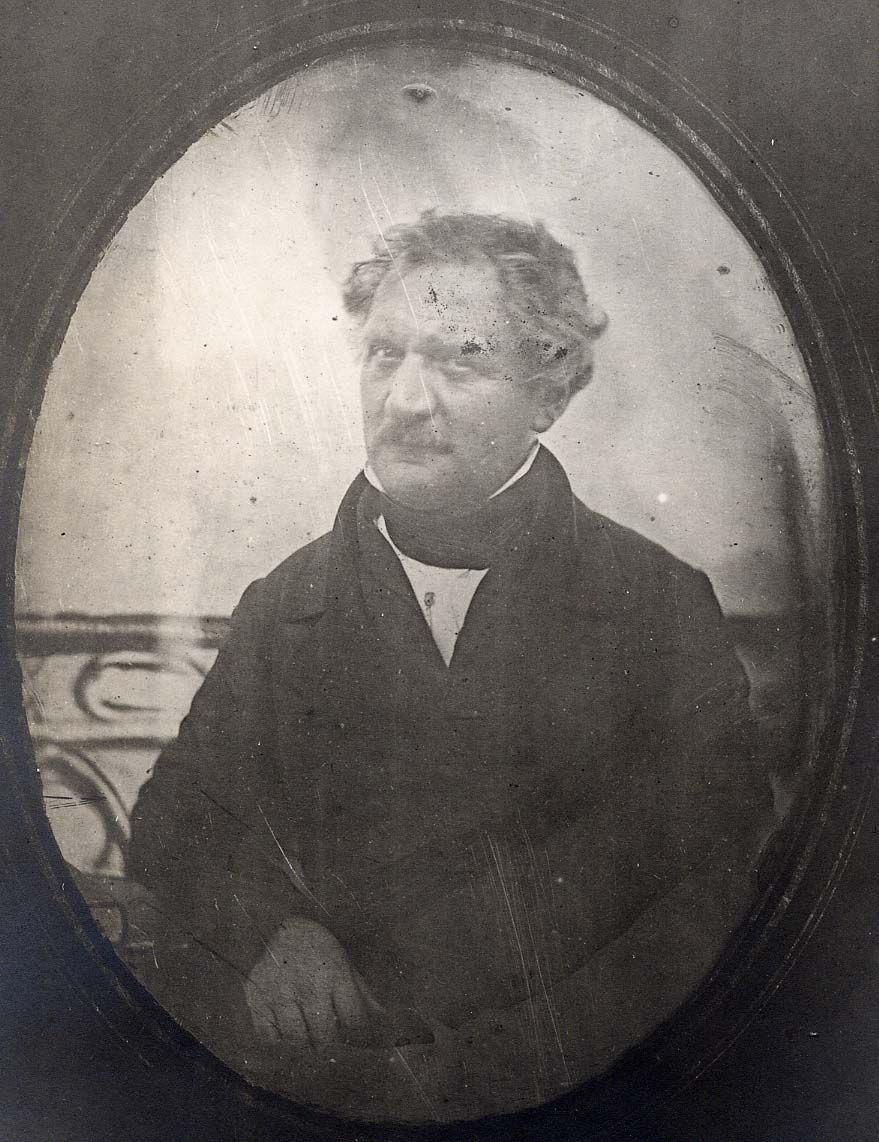
Fritz Courvoisier, one of the leaders of the republican revolution of 1848 that led to the overthrow of the Prince of Neuchâtel

The French Revolution of 1848, which overthrew the July Monarchy on 24 February 1848, sparked the revolutionary movement in Neuchâtel. On 26 February, news of the uprising in Paris reached the mountainous ares of the principality. Republicans took control of Le Locle on 29 February; the same day, the revolution spread to La Chaux-de-Fonds and the Val-de-Travers. On 1 March, the republican militias, led by Fritz Courvoisier and Ami Girard, marched on the city of Neuchâtel, captured Neuchâtel Castle and proclaimed the Republic and Canton of Neuchâtel.

A provisional government of ten members was formed to make the initial decisions and convene a constituent assembly, and administrative committees were appointed in each municipality to organize elections. The Constitution of 1848, quickly prepared, was accepted by a narrow majority, with 5,813 votes and 4,395 against. Only residents with Neuchâtel as their place of origin participated in the vote, and numerous royalists abstained. Voters also agreed to re-elect the constituent assembly, which became the first Grand Council of Neuchâtel, and a new seven-member Council of State then began its legislative work.

The royalists of Neuchâtel, however, did not abandon their goal of restoring the principality and launched an armed insurrection on 3 September 1856. The republicans quickly regained control of the situation, supported by Swiss troops sent by the Federal Council. The subsequent Neuchâtel Crisis then took on a European dimension: King Frederick William IV threatened to invade Switzerland, which, for its part, mobilized its army. Nevertheless, the mediation of the European powers led to the signing of the Treaty of Paris, on 26 May 1857, by which the King of Prussia finally renounced his claims to Neuchâtel in exchange for amnesty for the insurgents.

Of the many revolutions of 1848 in Europe, the Neuchâtel Revolution was one of the few to achieve permanent change. Despite its precarious beginnings, the fledgling republic of 1848 quickly succeeded in establishing stable and lasting institutions. As soon as the revolution was over, the prince released his subjects from their oath, though without relinquishing his rights to his principality. The royalists thus refrained from overtly obstructing the new regime. Furthermore, under the protection of the Swiss Confederation, the new authorities were able to consolidate the revolution and its aspirations in relative peace. The revolution of 1848 managed, without bloodshed, to overturn the established order and definitively overthrow the ancien régime.

== Economy ==
=== Agriculture ===
Traditional agricultural activities dominated Neuchâtel's economy until the mid-18th century. Around 1848, a third of the working population was still employed in this sector, but production was no longer sufficient to meet the growing demand resulting from steady population increase. Agricultural prices were also subject to significant fluctuations due to adverse weather conditions or political crises. Nevertheless, improved yields were achieved with the gradual introduction of farming methods stemming from the Physiocratic school during the 18th century. Despite some evident progress in agricultural practices, the country had to rely heavily on food imports, primarily from France and southern Germany. Viticulture remained the dominant activity on the shores of Lake Neuchâtel: in the early 19th century, vineyards covered more than 1,200 hectares.

=== Industry ===
Despite severe times of crisis, the period of 1750 to 1848 was decisive for the development of export-oriented manufacturing: lacemaking, indiennes and watchmaking. Watchmaking gradually supplanted textile-related activities. Neuchâtel's industrialization was based primarily on a craft-based organization of labor; in watchmaking, for example, the first true factories did not appear until the second half of the 19th century. Home-based work was predominant, except in rare cases in the indiennes industry and the production of watch blanks. The Fabrique-Neuve factory in Cortaillod (1752–1854) and the watch blank factory in Fontainemelon (1793, now ETA SA) were the only establishments with a large workforce. Before the emergence of these factories, Neuchâtel had little more than limited raw material production (iron and asphalt mines in the Val-de-Travers) and intensive use of watermills.

The transition of Neuchâtel's economy from traditional activities to early industries was facilitated by the expertise acquired in the forges and workshops of metalworkers. Factors that contributed to industrialization include, most notably, the culture that originated with the Reformation and the second wave of Huguenot refugees, who brought new practices to Neuchâtel. Furthermore, the principality adopted the principles of economic liberalism and encouraged the free establishment of trades that were protected elsewhere, while maintaining virtually no taxation on legal entities.

==== Watchmaking ====
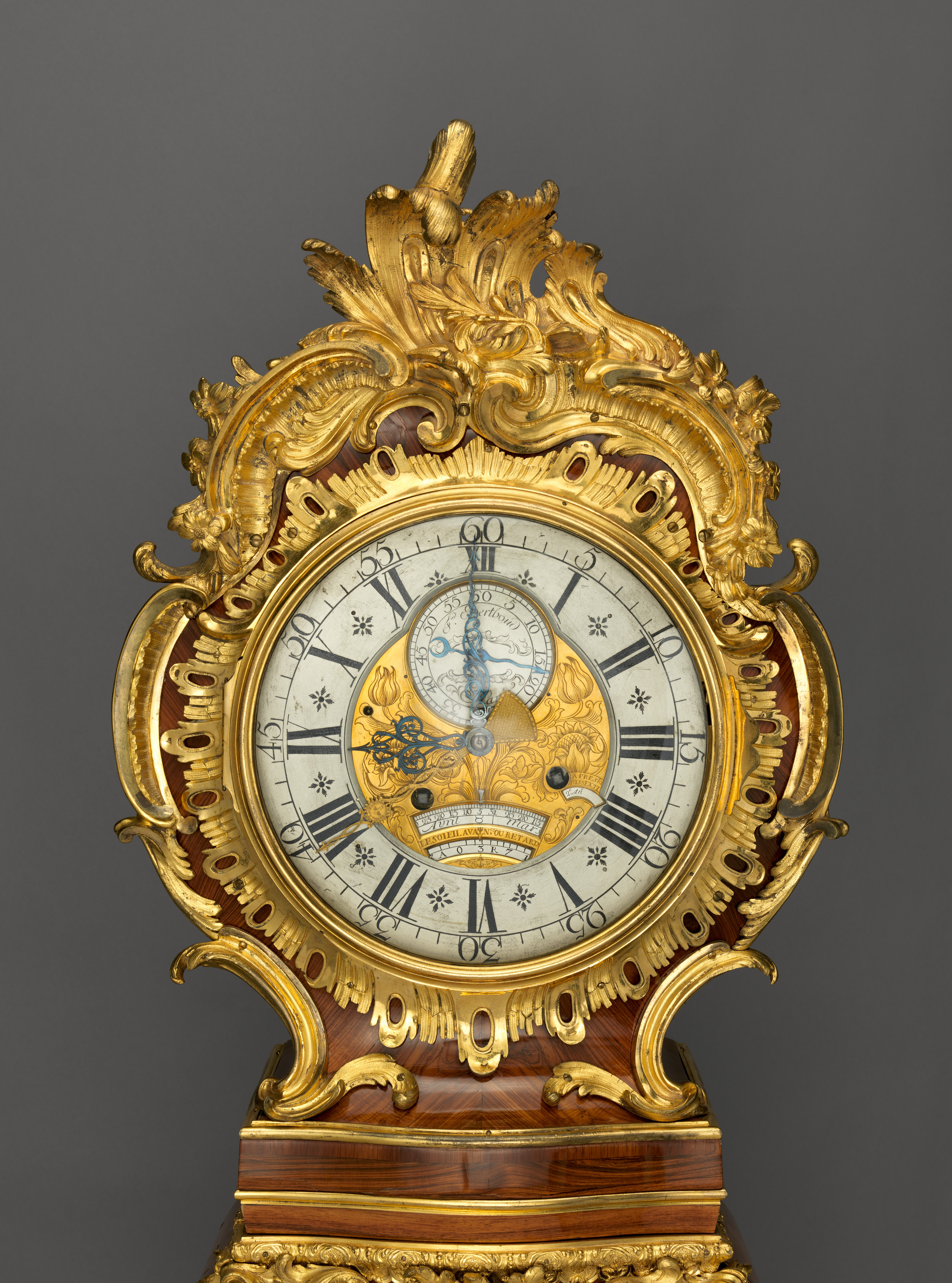
Longcase equation regulator by Ferdinand Berthoud, c. 1752

Among all the manufacturing industries of Neuchâtel, only watchmaking (and clockmaking) survived the various industrial crises. The first watchmaking workshops appeared in the mountainous countryside as early as the 17th century, and were also organized according to the Verlagssystem, similarly to lacemaking. Taken to its extreme, the division of labor allowed the watchmaker to obtain the necessary parts for manufacturing a watch or clock cheaply. While many peasants benefited from this employment opportunity, their role has often been exaggerated, as very quickly, urban workshops established in Le Locle or La Chaux-de-Fonds laid the foundations of an extremely demanding industry in technical skill.

It was indeed around famous watchmakers such as Henri-Louis Jaquet-Droz, Pierre Jaquet-Droz, Ferdinand Berthoud, Jacques-Frédéric Houriet, and Abraham-Louis Breguet that a solid industry was created, one that would leave a lasting mark and influence Neuchâtel's economy to the present day. From the 18th century onwards, Neuchâtel's watchmaking spread to all continents and ensured the prosperity of mountain towns such as Le Locle and La Chaux-de-Fonds.

==== Indiennes ====
Imported from Republic of Geneva in the first half of the 18th century, the indiennes industry took root on the lake shore thanks to Huguenot merchants like Jean-Jacques Deluze. Several factories were established around the river Areuse, producing for trading companies based in Neuchâtel. This international trade generated considerable wealth, which benefited the city of Neuchâtel. Notable centers of indiennage included the towns of Boudry and Cortaillod. Like lacemaking, the indiennes industry disappeared in the second half of the 19th century, having contributed Neuchâtel's international renown.

==== Lacemaking ====
Lacemaking, which emerged in Neuchâtel in the 17th century, provided work for a large female workforce scattered across farms in Neuchâtel's mountains. Entrepreneurs who supplied the raw materials and sold the finished products in European markets. This industry declined from the 1820s onwards due to a failure to mechanize and, most importantly, because it could not compete with watchmaking.

=== Finance and international trade ===
In the 18th century, Neuchâtel's commercial center became very attractive to foreign investors, and the principality's attachment to the Prussian crown further enhanced this appeal. While not pursuing an interventionist policy, the Council of State nevertheless supported industrial and commercial development that would generate a significant rise in the population's standard of living. Several Neuchâtel natives distinguished themselves in trade and banking at the international level, such as David de Pury in Lisbon, Jean-Frédéric Perregaux and Denis de Rougemont in Paris, and the Pourtalès family, particularly Jacques-Louis de Pourtalès.

== Government ==
=== Governor ===
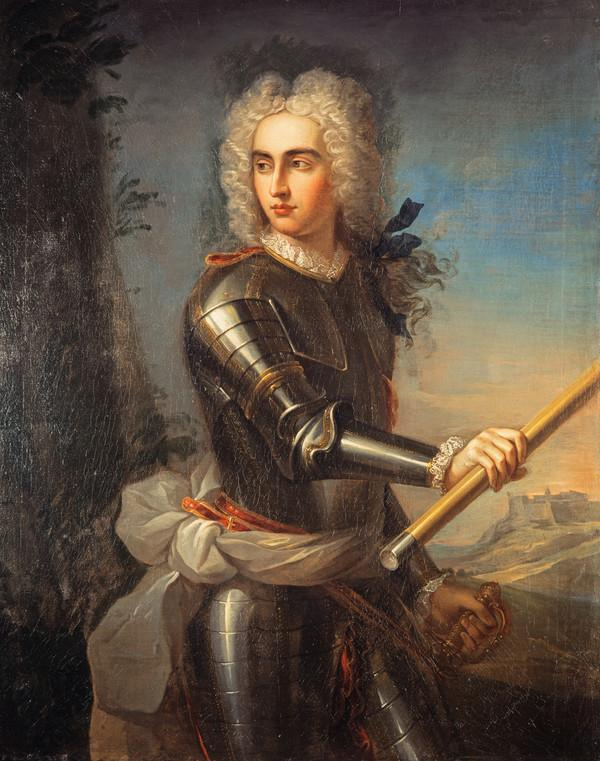
George Keith, 10th Earl Marischal, a Scottish-born Prussian officer who served as governor of Neuchâtel from 1754 to 1768

The office of governor (gouverneur) of Neuchâtel was created in the 15th century by Jeanne of Hachberg-Sausenberg, when Neuchâtel was still a county, as the representative of the sovereign, who only visited to Neuchâtel occasionally. This post remained in place throughout the existence of the principality. The Orléans-Longueville family generally selected governors from prominent families from Catholic cantons, such as Fribourg and Solothurn. The Hohenzollerns, on the other hand, tended to appoint Huguenots who had taken refuge in Prussia. The governors of Neuchâtel were often absent from the principality, a situation that changed after the restoration of 1815.

The governor's duties were to represent the sovereign's interests, preside over the Council of State and the tribunal of the Three Estates, resolve eventual conflicts within the Council of State, and exercise the right of pardon, a prerogative that was however usually left to the Council of State.

=== Council of State ===
The establishment of the Council of State (Conseil d'État) dates back to the 1530s, though it was not until the 1580s that the body acquired its definitive name. It gradually gained importance, evolving from a simple advisory body to the executive government of the principality. The Council of State possessed broad powers, including financial matters, relations with the Swiss, judicial powers (administration of high justice, appointment of judges to the various courts) and public order. The powers of the Council of State declined after the restoration of 1815, the return of a resident governor to the principality, and the successive establishment of the General Courts and then the Legislative Body.

The number of members of the Council of State varied considerably over time, ranging from eight after 1831 to around twenty in the 18th century. Members of the council were appointed by the Prince of Neuchâtel, but upon the recommendation of the Council of State itself, thus a form of co-optation. The State Councilors were drawn from the families of Neuchâtel, initially from old feudal nobility, then also from bourgeois families of the capital and the countryside. Between 1707 and 1806, a quarter of State Councilors came from the Montmollin and Chambrier families. The bourgeois families represented on the Council of State were often ennobled by the Prince of Neuchâtel. The body survived the 1848 revolution, an exception among the institutions of the principality, and exists to this day as the Council of State of the Canton of Neuchâtel.

=== Tribunal of the Three Estates ===
The tribunal of the Three Estates (tribunal des Trois-Etats) constituted the supreme court of the Principality of Neuchâtel. It was composed of twelve judges divided into three groups: the four most senior State Councilors, all nobles, formed the first group. The second group comprised the four châtelains of Le Landeron, Boudry, Val-de-Travers, and Thielle, and the third was composed of four city councilors from Neuchâtel.

=== General Audiences and Legislative Body ===
In 1815, after the restoration of the Principality of Neuchâtel to the King of Prussia and its parallel accessation to the Swiss Confederation, the prince established the General Audiences (Audiences générales), of which he appointed the majority of members. Following the July Revolution in France and the unrest it provoked in Neuchâtel, the Legislative Body (Corps législatif) was instituted in 1831 by Frederick William III of Prussia to replace the General Audiences. Members of the body were elected by census suffrage. While the establishment of the Legislative Body marked the beginning of a separation of powers, it failed to convince the republicans, who revolted unsuccessfully that same year. The Legislative Body was dissolved after the 1848 revolution and replaced by the Grand Council of the Canton of Neuchâtel.

== Religion ==
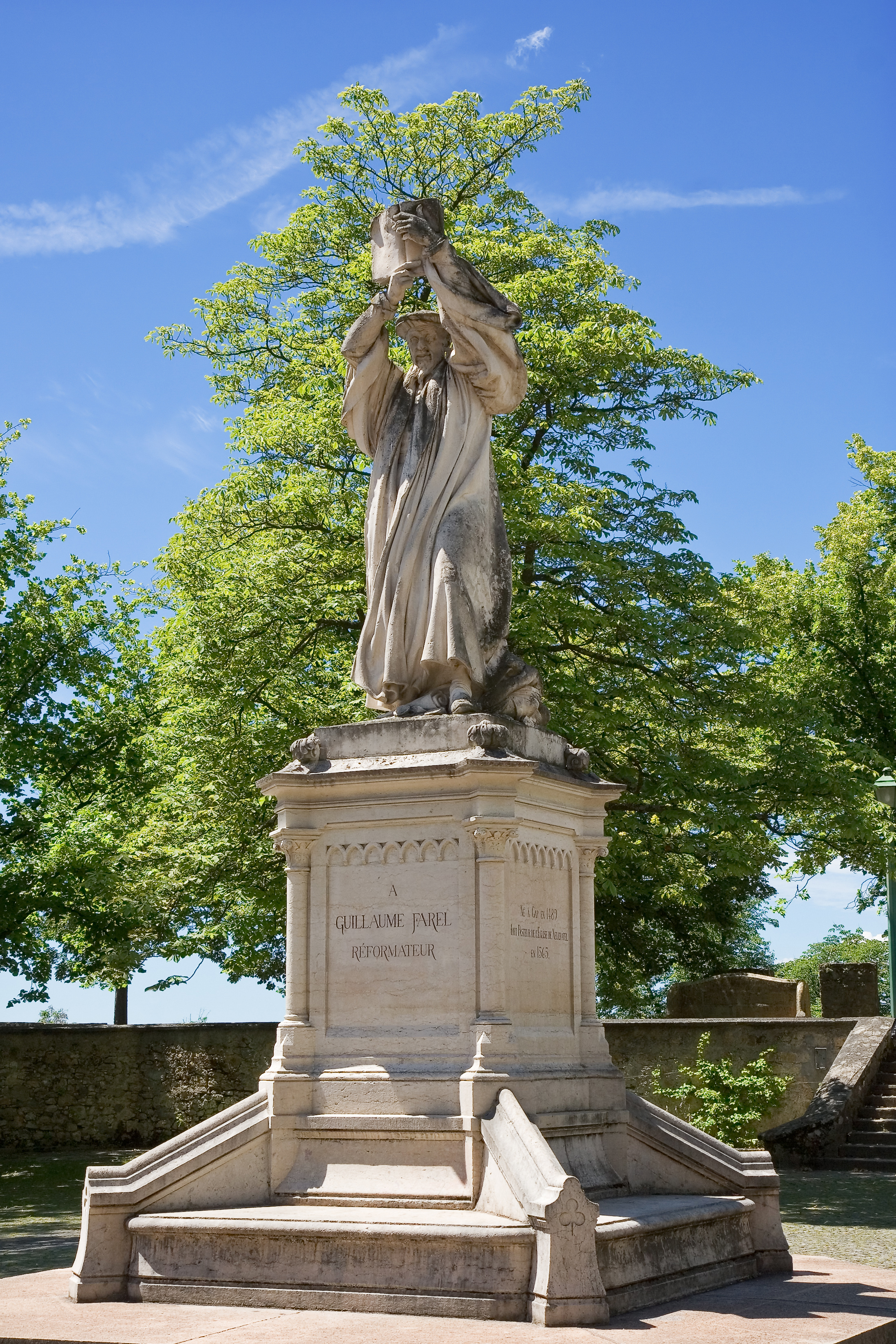
Statue of Guillaume Farel, the Protestant reformer of Neuchâtel

In the Middle Ages, the County of Neuchâtel fell under the diocese of Lausanne except for two parishes, Les Verrières and Les Brenets, which were under the diocese of Besançon. Of the 19 parishes in the region on the eve of the Reformation, 15 are attested before the 13th century. In addition to the priory of Bevaix, whose founding charter dated to 998 represents the first document used for the history of the local Church, there were two other Benedictine priories at Môtiers and Corcelles, as well as the Premonstratensian Abbey of Fontaine-André. The presence of a chapter of canons in Neuchâtel is attested in 1185; construction of the collegiate church at Neuchâtel had begun shortly before. A collegiate church and chapter existed in Valangin as early as 1505.

The weakness of comital power after the Swiss occupation of Neuchâtel (1512–1529), the absence and negligence of Jeanne of Hachberg-Sausenberg, and the emancipation of the Neuchâtel burghers and their Burgrecht with Bern all contributed to the adoption of the Protestant Reformation. The movement was sparked by French preacher Guillaume Farel, an emissary from Bern who was present intermittently in the city and in the lordship of Valangin since 1529. After the looting of the collegiate church of Neuchâtel during a popular uprising on 23 October 1530, a thin majority of the city's burghers voted to abolish the Mass on 4 November.

The Reformation spread quickly along the shore and more slowly in the Val-de-Travers and the lordship of Valangin. The lord of the latter, René de Challant, represented by his grandmother Guillemette de Vergy, fiercely opposed to the new ideas and only yielded in 1536, when the occupation of neighboring Vaud by Bern threatened his estates. Only the parishes of Cressier and Le Landeron (including Lignières), in the east of the territory, remained Catholic thanks to the Burgrecht between Le Landeron and Solothurn and the influence of the powerful Vallier family. Neuchâtel became a center of Protestant propaganda for French-speaking countries; the press of Pierre de Vingle published numerous pamphlets, including Le Livre des Marchans (1533) and Antoine Marcourt's Placards contre la messe (1534), and most notably, Pierre Robert Olivétan's Bible (1535), the first Protestant Bible in French.

Despite the Church's strong hold on society, dissenting voices emerged as early as the Reformation. The Anabaptists were expelled from the territory in the mid-16th century. In 1707, persecuted Bernese Anabaptists settled in the mountains and the Val-de-Ruz. In the second half of the 18th century, the Moravian Brethren founded a boarding school for girls in Montmirail (municipality of La Tène), taking advantage of the relative religious tolerance granted by the King of Prussia.

Marshal Berthier's rule saw the beginning of a gradual re-establishment of Catholic worship, first in the city of Neuchâtel and then throughout the principality. In 1806, Mass was celebrated in the collegiate church of Neuchâtel for the first time since the Reformation. In 1811, a chapel was set up for the Hospitaller Sisters of Besançon, who were called upon to run the first modern hospital in Neuchâtel, founded by Jacques-Louis de Pourtalès. Upon his restoration, Frederick William III of Prussia proclaimed the free exercise of the Protestant and Catholic religions "without regard to domicile". In 1828, the chapel of Maladière, which replaced that of the hospital, became the first Catholic place of worship to be built since the Reformation, and was later turned into a parish church.

== Society and culture ==
Rare documents suggest the existence of elementary schools in Neuchâtel at the end of the Middle Ages. However, schooling in the country only began to flourish after the Reformation. It developed within the framework of the bourgeoisie and the communities under the control of the Church. Initially concentrated on the shore and in the valleys, schooling only reached the mountains in the 17th century. The city of Neuchâtel had a college as early as the 16th century, preparing students for higher education. The first forms of academic teaching were established in the 18th century; in 1731, the city instituted a chair of philosophy and mathematics, with Huguenot refugee Louis Bourguet as its first occupant. In 1737, a chair of literature was added to that of philosophy. Teaching was nevertheless irregular; to complete their studies, students from Neuchâtel enrolled in Swiss academies and universities (Lausanne, Geneva, Basel, and Zurich), with a few studying abroad.

Until the late 17th century, religion profoundly influenced social and cultural behavior. For most people in Neuchâtel, literature was limited to books of practical use and devotion. Utilitarian concerns kept them from cultivating the sciences and arts, which still clashed with the conservatism of civil and religious authorities. Neuchâtel's society began to open up at the beginning of the 18th century with the development of trade and commerce, and the emergence of the first media outlets that facilitated the circulation of ideas. Newspapers gradually spread throughout the principality thanks to the formation of small groups of enthusiasts who shared the subscription costs (reading societies). Launched in Neuchâtel in 1732, the Mercure suisse helped to stimulate intellectual curiosity and cultivate a taste for literature and science. The journal stimulated the activities of a number of scholars, such as Laurent Garcin and Jean-Antoine d'Ivernois, who formed a circle around Louis Bourguet, whose work paved the way for the study of geology, paleontology, and botany. During his stay in Môtiers from 1762 to 1765, Jean-Jacques Rousseau helped popularize botany with his plant-collecting expeditions.

Intellectual and artistic life began to expand in the 1750s and 1760s. Having embraced French intellectual ideas and trends, the Neuchâtel elite discovered refined manners and entertainment arts and started to cultivate music and theatre. In 1754, the capital established a music academy, and in 1769, a music hall was built where balls and theatrical performances were also held. A music academy was also active in La Chaux-de-Fonds in the 1770s. The interior decoration of elegant homes stimulated artistic creation, which was primarily focused on miniature and family portraits, the finest example of which was the work Jean-Pierre Preudhomme. Engraving flourished thanks to Henri Courvoisier-Voisin and the sons of the Locle bookseller Samuel Girardet: Charles Samuel, Abraham Louis, Alexandre, and Abraham. However, emigration was the fate of the most talented artists, such as the painter Louis Léopold Robert, who spent his entire career in Italy.

The principality was influenced very early on by the Enlightenment. The new ideas were stirred in small circles formed around individuals associated with anticlerical and freethinking movements, such as Pierre-Alexandre DuPeyrou, Jean-Jacques Rousseau, and Isabelle de Charrière. From the 1770s onward, publisher Samuel Fauche and the Société typographique de Neuchâtel played a crucial role in disseminating Enlightenment thought by specializing in reprinting and trading encyclopedic and philosophical literature.

== See also ==
- List of consorts of Neuchâtel
