= Pierre Dubois =

Pierre Dubois may refer to:

- Pierre Dubois (scholastic) (c. 1255–after 1321), a French publicist in the reign of Philip the Fair
- Pierre Dubois Davaugour (before 1620–1664), Governor of New France from 1661 to 1663
- Pierre Joseph Dubois (1852–1924), French World War I general
- Pierre H. Dubois (1917–1999), Dutch writer and critic
- Pierre Max Dubois (1930–1995), French composer of classical music
- Pierre Dubois (politician) (1938–2025), Swiss politician
- Pierre du Bois de Dunilac (1943–2007), Swiss writer
- Pierre Dubois (author) (born 1945), French author
- Pierre-Luc Dubois (born 1998), Canadian professional ice hockey player
