= Peter Caulitz =

German painter

Peter Caulitz (c.1650–1719) was a German painter of landscapes and animals, especially domestic fowl. Born in Berlin, he studied in Italy, and was a court painter to Frederick the Great.

== Background ==
Peter Caulitz was born to poor parents in Berlin in about 1650. He served as a drummer in a regiment of dragoons before becoming an assistant to a young painter who took him to Rome where he developed his skills as an artist.

== Paintings ==
Caulitz was back in Berlin by 1681, and in 1695 was appointed court painter to Frederick I of Prussia. He made a second visit to Italy in the company of his fellow court painter, Samuel Theodor Gericke. He retained his post at court until his death in Berlin in 1719.

Caulitz' work consists of landscapes, including views of Prussian royal castles, and pictures of animals, especially hens and turkeys. His animal paintings show the influence of the Dutch artists Melchior d'Hondecoeter and Jan Weenix. The Berlin Museum has a scene representing a poultry-yard by him; there are other examples at Potsdam and at Brunswick. Caulitz' washed pen piece, Landscape with a Ruin, became part of The Museum of Fine Arts, Budapest.

Caulitz also worked in mosaic and restored paintings. His widow continued the restoration business after his death.
