= Pierre Dubois (politician) =

Swiss politician (1938–2025)

Member of the Council of State of the Canton of Neuchâtel
- In office 15 June 1980 – 19 May 1997
- Preceded by: René Meylan

Grand Council of Neuchâtel
- In office 1973–1980

Personal details
- Born: 22 October 1938 Peseux, Switzerland
- Died: 9 June 2025 (aged 86) Neuchâtel, Switzerland
- Party: PS
- Education: University of Neuchâtel
- Occupation: Teacher

Pierre Dubois (22 October 1938 – 9 June 2025) was a Swiss politician of the Swiss Socialist Party (PS).

== Life and career ==
Born in Peseux on 22 October 1938, Dubois studied and subsequently taught economics at the University of Neuchâtel. He was a member of the Nouvelle Gauche socialiste from 1958 to 1962 before joining the PS. He was a member of the Grand Council of Neuchâtel from 1973 to 1980, sitting on the financial and legal committees and heading a special committee for studying the problems in inter-municipal relations.

In 1980, Dubois was elected to the Council of State of the Canton of Neuchâtel in a by-election to replace René Meylan. He served four terms as president of the Council. In 1991, he was an unsuccessful candidate for the Council of States, losing in the first round to right-wing candidates Thierry Béguin and Jean Cavadini. In 1983, he was president of the cantonal Council of State during French President François Mitterrand's official visit to the Canton. In addition to his political career, he was an avid football fan, supporting Neuchâtel Xamax FCS.

Dubois died in Neuchâtel on 9 June 2025, at the age of 86.
