= Charles Girardet =

Charles Girardet may refer to:

- Karl Girardet (Charles Girardet, 1813–1871), Swiss painter and illustrator
- Charles Samuel Girardet (1780–1863), his father, Swiss engraver and lithographer
