= Louis Bourguet =

French polymath (1678-1742)

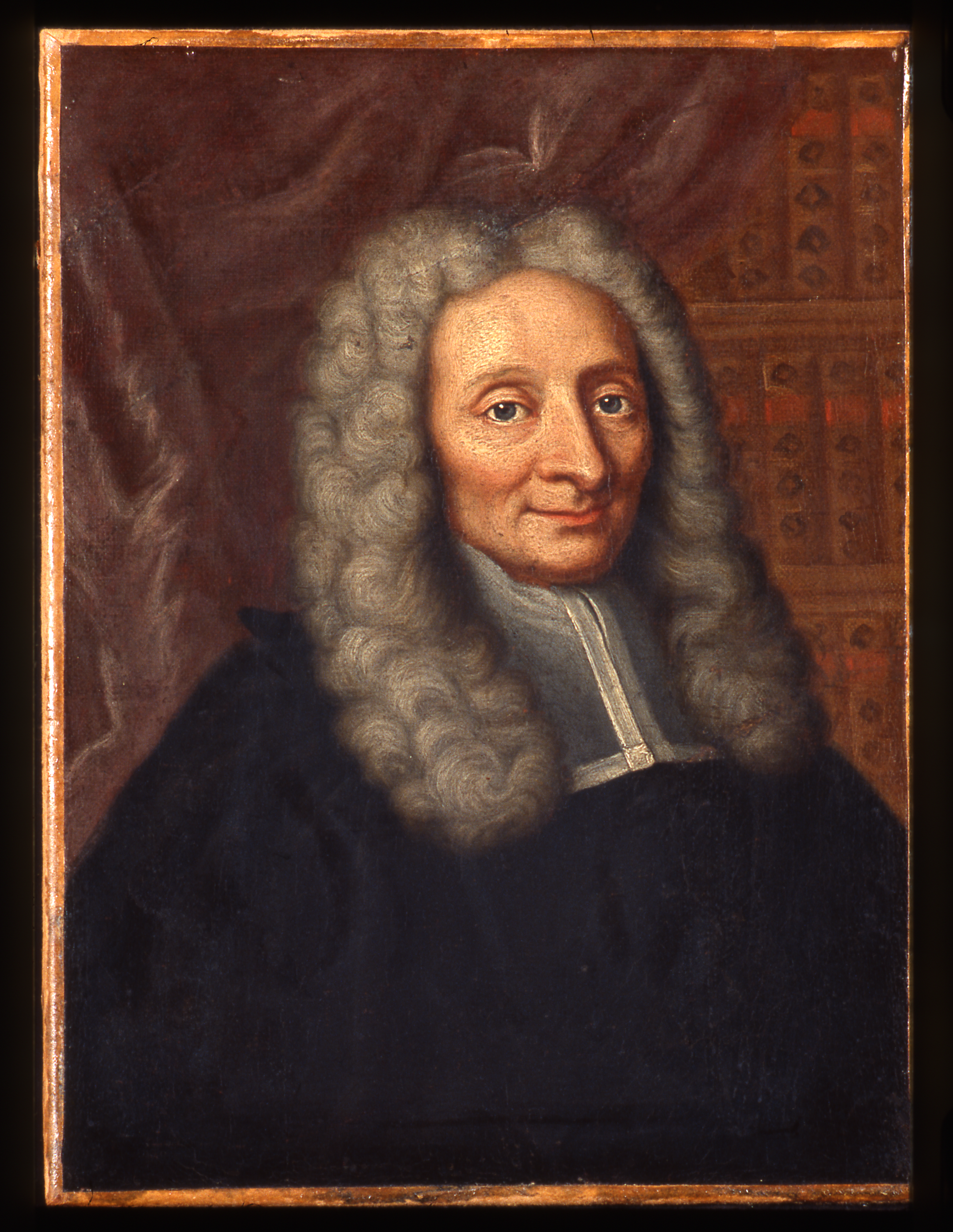
Portrait by Robert Gardelle, 1742

Louis Bourguet (23 April 1678 – 31 December 1742) was a French-born polymath and correspondent of Leibniz who wrote on archaeology, geology, philosophy, Biblical scholarship and mathematics.

Bourguet came to Switzerland as religious refugee and studied in Zurich. He traveled extensively before settling in Neuchâtel, where became Professor of Philosophy and Mathematics in 1731. He tried to integrate Leibnizian philosophy with issues in natural philosophy.

== Biography ==
Bourguet was born on 23 April 1678 into a Huguenot family in Nîmes, southern France, the son of Jean Bourguet, a merchant, and Catherine Rey. His family left France for Switzerland following the revocation of the Edict of Nantes. Bourguet studied in Zurich, where he was a pupil of Johann Jakob Scheuchzer, and traveled extensively, particularly in Italy, where he learned Hebrew, mathematics, and natural sciences.

In 1702, Bourguet married Susanne Jourdan, a fellow Huguenot refugee. He settled in Neuchâtel, in the Principality of Neuchâtel, temporarily after his marriage and then permanently in 1715, and was naturalized by Prince Frederick I in 1710. Bourguet gathered around him a circle of botanists, geologists, and meteorologists. He was one of the founders of the Bibliothèque italique in 1728 and of the journal Le Mercure suisse in 1732.

Bourguet was appointed professor of philosophy and mathematics in Neuchâtel in 1731. He also gave public lectures, which he opened to women. Bourguet was a member of the academies of sciences in Paris, Berlin, and Cortona, and corresponded with Gottfried Wilhelm Leibniz, Johann Bernoulli, and René Antoine Ferchault de Réaumur, among others. He died on 31 December 1742 in Neuchâtel, aged 64.

== Works ==
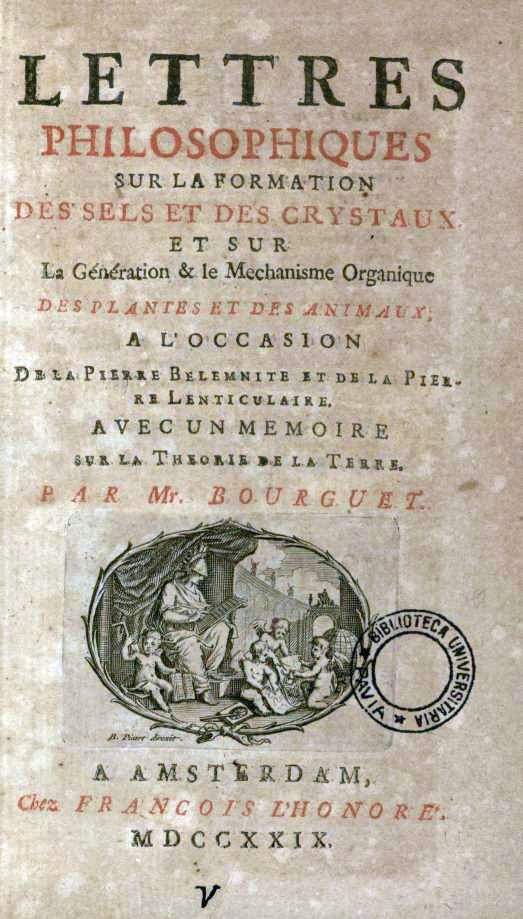
Lettres philosophiques sur la formation des sels et des crystaux et sur la génération et le mechanisme organique des plantes et des animaux, 1729

- Lettres philosophiques sur la formation des sels et des crystaux et sur la génération et le mechanisme organique des plantes et des animaux (in French). Amsterdam. 1729 – via François L'Honoré.
- Traité des petrifications, 1742
