= Fritz Courvoisier =

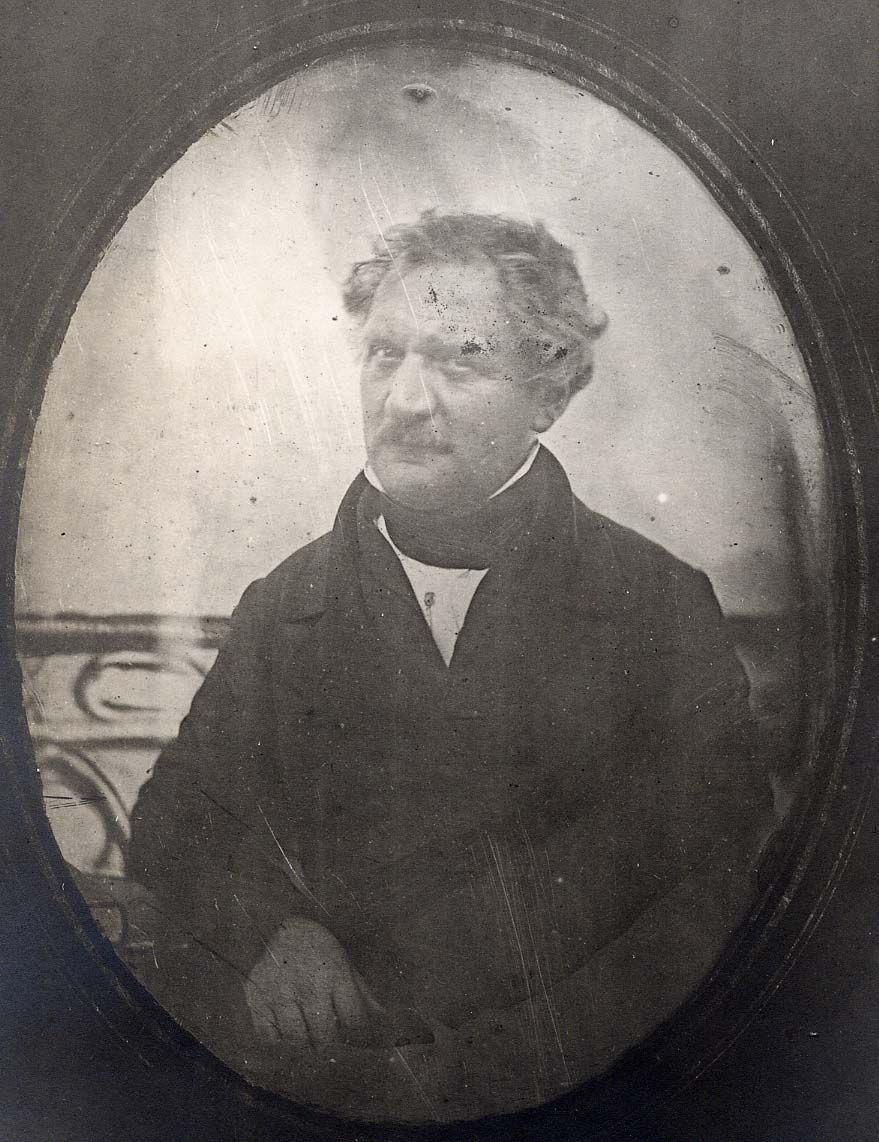
Fritz Courvoisier

Frédéric Alexandre 'Fritz' Courvoisier (1 July 1799 – 10 December 1854) was a watchmaker for the first part of his life, then joined the military and later on became a political figure.

== Biography ==
Courvoisier was born at La Chaux-de-Fonds into a family of watchmakers and clockmakers; he worked in the trade of his family with his father and brothers before creating his own enterprise in 1832.

in 1826, he married Anna Rothpletz, with whom he had two sons, Paul and Emile. His wife, Anna, died in 1836 at age of 30. He then travelled to examine the watchmaking and clock making industry in many places such as France, Italy, Portugal and Russia.

When he returned to Switzerland, he then became elected the captain of the "Carabiniers" of La Chaux-de-Fonds. in 1847, he participated in the Sonderbund War (in which Neuchatel was neutral).

== Revolution of Neuchatel ==
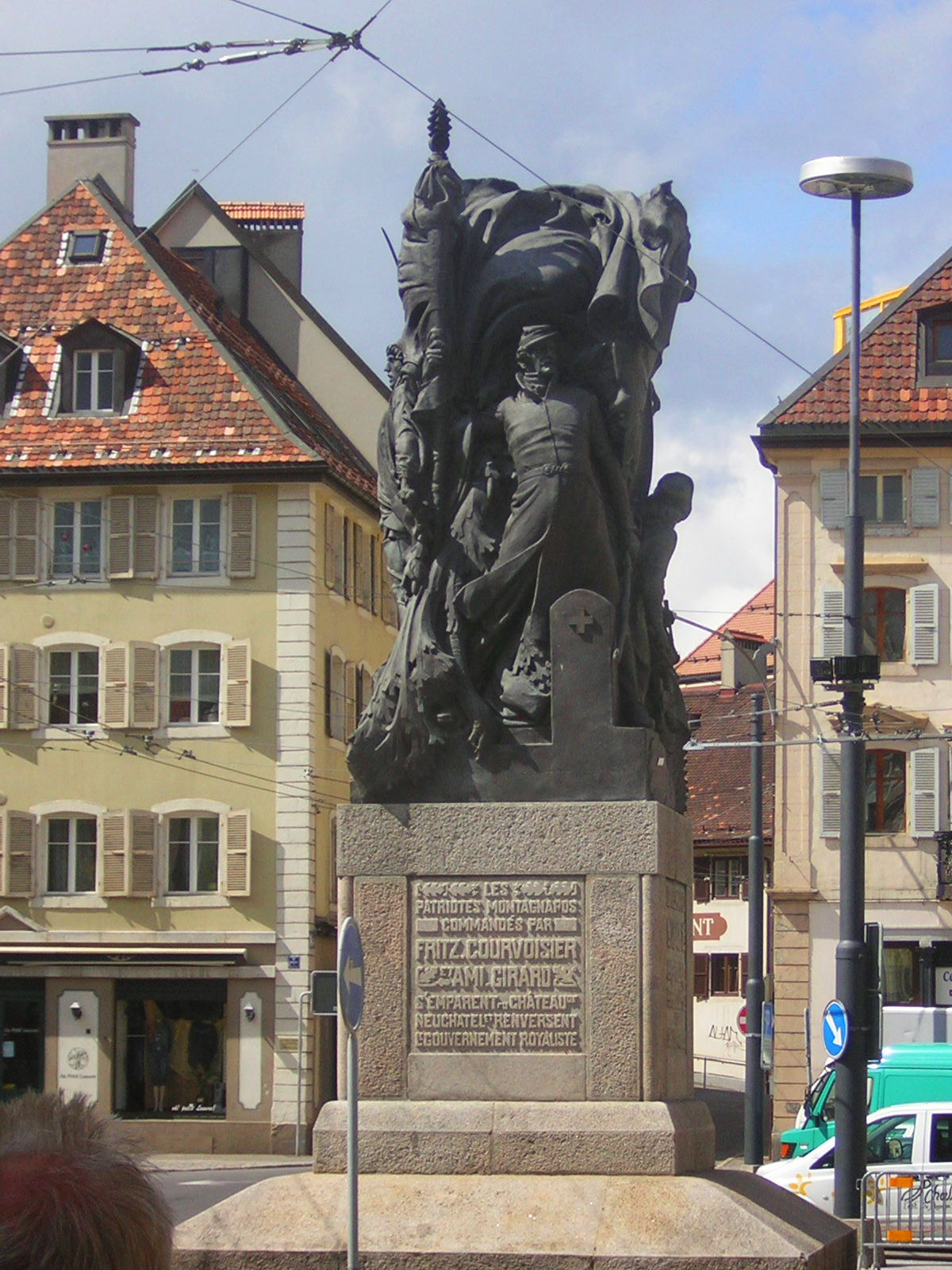
monument of Fritz Courvoisier and Girard at La Chaux-de-Fonds

Following the French Revolution of 1848 the people of the canton de Neuchatel, especially from Le Locle and La Chaux-de-Fonds elected Fritz Courvoisier as their commander in chief in a republican coup.

On 29 February 1848 a soldier called Ami Girard arrived from Saint-Imier and agreed to march with Fritz Courvoisier from la Chaux-de-Fonds Neuchâtel along with 200 volunteers. On 1 March at 8pm the Castle of Neuchâtel fell into the hands of the revolutionaries. By the 5th ambassadors from Switzerland had recognized the new government and the Republic of Neuchatel was formed.

== After the Revolution ==
From 1851 to 1854, he was elected in the radical-democratic party as national advisor and fought for the reconstruction of railways between the Swiss plains and France, passing through Morteau, Le Locle, La Chaux-de-Fonds, Saint-Imier via the Val-de-Travers. After disputes between the various cantons they agreed to build a railway, but Courvoisier's preferred line was not chosen.

Fritz Courvoisier died on 10 December 1854 at Neuchâtel, by an attack of apoplexy.

== Archive sources ==
- COURVOISIER, Fonds: Louis et Fritz Courvoisier (1740-1913). Archives de l'État de Neuchâtel.
