= Abraham Girardet =

Swiss engraver and illustrator

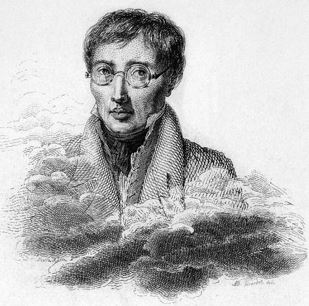
Self-portrait (c.1800)

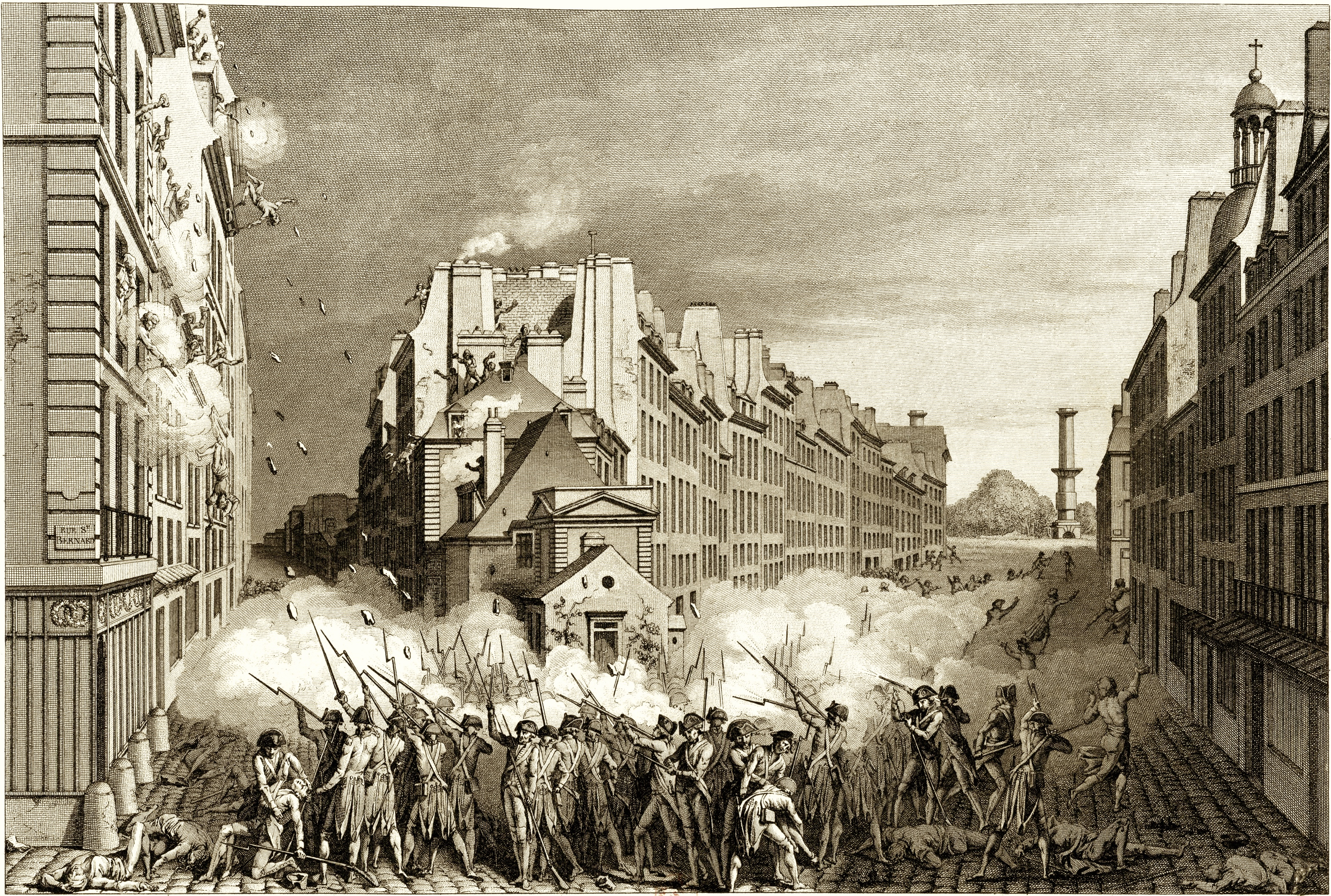
Fusillade at Faubourg Saint-Antoine (Réveillon riots)

Abraham Girardet (30 November 1764, Le Locle - 2 January 1823, Paris) was an engraver and illustrator born in the Principality of Neuchâtel.

== Biography ==
He was the eldest son of the publisher and bookseller, Samuel Girardet (1730–1807). In 1783, he moved to Paris, where he took lessons in drawing and printmaking from Bénédict Alphonse Nicollet (1743–1807). His siblings, Abraham Louis, Alexandre, Charles Samuel, and Julie (1769–1817) also worked as engravers.

He remained in Paris during the early stages of the Revolution, creating depictions of major events. From 1792 to 1794, however, he returned to Neuchâtel and became a teacher there. This was followed by an extended trip to what is now Italy. When he returned to Paris in 1795, he focused on making prints.

Many of his best known engravings are taken from the Old Masters; notably, the Transfiguration (after Raphael), the Rape of the Sabine Women (after Nicolas Poussin), the Triumph of Titus and Vespasia (after Giulio Romano) and the Dead Savior (after Andrea del Sarto).

He received awards at the Salon of 1806 and 1808. In his later years, he was a drawing teacher at the Gobelins Manufactory.

== Sources ==
- "Girardet, Abraham" in German, French and Italian in the online Historical Dictionary of Switzerland.
- (in German) Valérie Louzier-Gentaz: Girardet, Abraham. In: Allgemeines Künstlerlexikon. Die Bildenden Künstler aller Zeiten und Völker (AKL). Band 55, Saur, München u. a. 2007, ISBN 978-3-598-22795-0, S. 181
- René Burnand: L’étonnante histoire des Girardet. Artistes suisses. La Baconnière, Neuchâtel 1940.
- René Burnand: Les Girardet au Locle et dans le monde. Éd. de la Baconnière, Neuchâtel 1957.
