= Samuel Theodor Gericke =

German painter

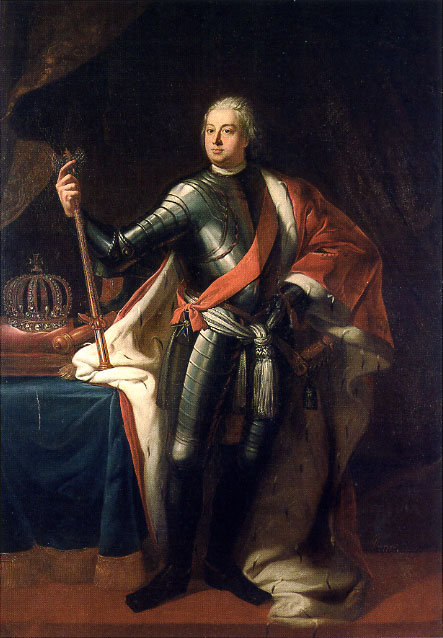
Frederick William I of Prussia, 1713

Samuel Theodor Gericke or Gerike (1665–1730) was a German painter. Born in Spandau in 1665, he became at first a student of Rutger van Langevelt, and later of Gedeon Romandon.

In 1694 he went to Rome to get prints, books, drawings and plaster casts for the Prussian Academy of Arts in Berlin, which would be established in 1696. In Rome, he was a student of Carlo Maratta. Gericke returned to Berlin in 1696 and was appointed court painter. In 1699 he became Professor of Perspective at the Academy, and one of its first 8 rectors. He served as the annual Director of the Academy a few times.

He translated De Arte Graphica, the famous 1668 poem by Charles Alphonse du Fresnoy, into German in 1699. Other art theoretical works he translated include the Grondlegginge der teekenkonst by Gerard de Lairesse (original 1701, translation 1705).
