= Jacques-Louis de Pourtalès =

Swiss plantation owner, entrepreneur and banker

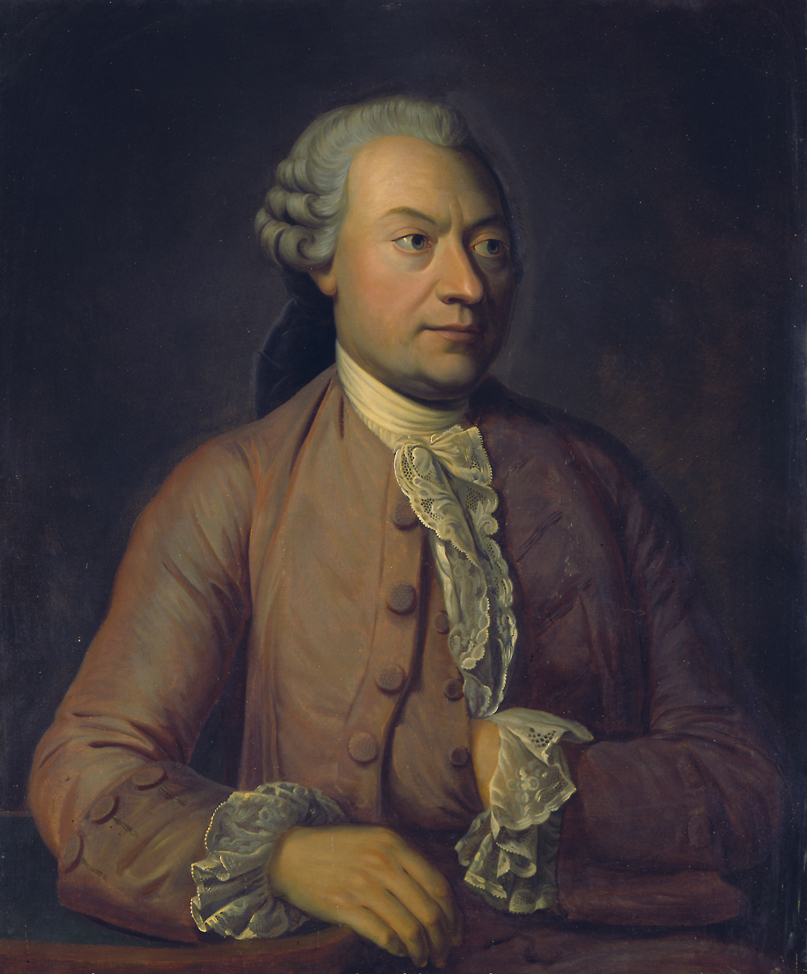
Portrait of Jacques-Louis de Pourtalès, 1766

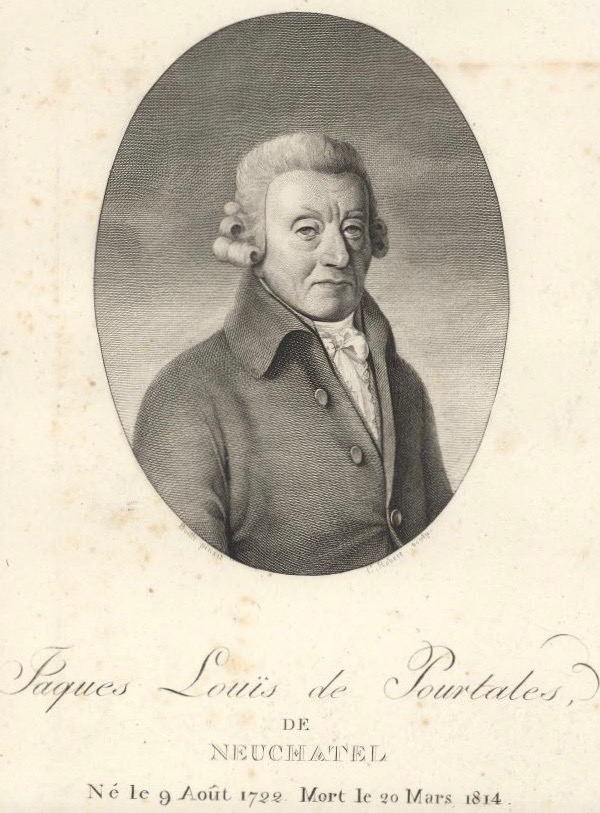
Portrait of Jacques-Louis de Pourtalès, before 1814

Jacques-Louis de Pourtalès (from 14 February 1750 Jacques-Louis de Pourtalès, also Jakob Ludwig von Pourtalès; 9 August 1722 in Geneva – 20 March 1814 in Neuchâtel), was a plantation owner, entrepreneur and private banker.

== Family ==
Jacques-Louis de Pourtalès came from the Huguenot family Pourtalès, which had fled to Neuchâtel from religious persecution in France. He was the eldest son of Jérémie Pourtalès (born 14 January 1701 in Lasalle in the department Gard; died 7 February 1784 in Neuchâtel) and his wife Esther Marguerite (born 20 March 1695 in Neuchâtel; died 21 April 1778 there), the daughter of the French merchant Jacques de Luze (1665–1733). His father had left his home village in the Cévennes and had first settled in Lyon, then in Geneva and finally in Neuchâtel. His mother's family had also had to flee from France and was actively involved in Neuchâtel in founding the first calico printing works (Indiennes). He had six more siblings.

Due to his father's absence, Jacques-Louis de Pourtalès grew up with his maternal grandparents and was raised in a strictly Protestant spirit, which he maintained throughout his life.

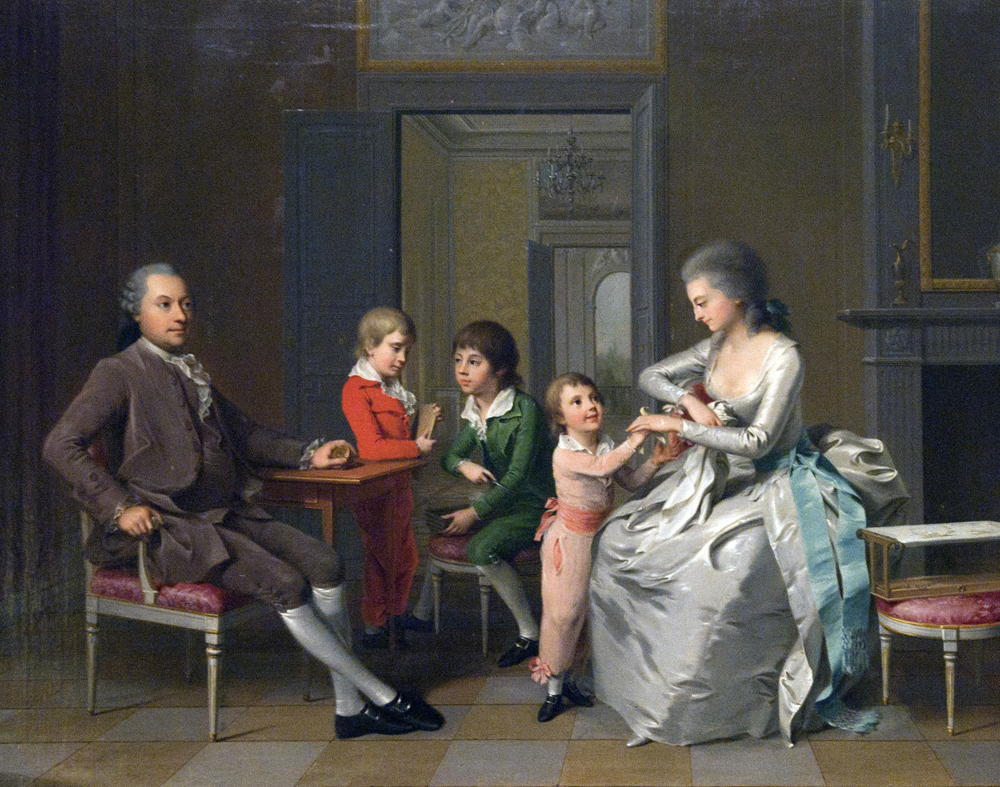
Jacques-Louis de Pourtalès with his family, 1784

In 1769, Jacques-Louis de Pourtalès married his cousin Rose-Augustine (born 6 January 1752 in Neuchâtel; died 5 February 1791 there), who was 30 years younger, the daughter of his uncle, the Indienne manufacturer Jean-Jacques Deluze (1728–1777). The couple had two daughters and four sons, of whom only Louis, James-Alexandre and Frédéric (born 28 February 1779 in Neuchâtel; died 30 January 1861 in Clarens) reached adulthood.

His descendants were the sailor Hermann de Pourtalès, the writer Guy de Pourtalès, the painter Horace de Saussure, the linguist René de Saussure, the linguist Ferdinand de Saussure, the sinologist Léopold de Saussure, the clergyman Jean de Saussure and the psychoanalyst Raymond de Saussure.

== Career ==
At the age of 14, Jacques-Louis de Pourtalès moved to London for a few months to learn from his father, who was a partner in the wholesale firm Pourtalès, Simons et Cie dealing in cambric. This early experience in an international trading city laid the foundation for his later career and opened perspectives for him in the trading world.

From 1736 to 1738 he worked at the transport company Faesch in Basel, before continuing his training in Basel in the family-run firm De Luze, Chaillet et Pourtalès and later acquiring shares in the company. From 1744 he was a partner in the firm De Luze, Meuron et Cie, which was active in the India trade and calico printing. In 1753 he founded, together with Claude-Abram DuPasquier (1717–1783) and Jean-Jacques Bovet (1728–1793), who had founded the company Fabrique-Neuve de Cortaillod a year earlier, the trading company Pourtalès et Cie, which quickly gained importance. His goal was to control the entire trade chain in the Indienne business – from purchasing the raw materials to printing the fabrics to selling them on the European markets, which he regularly visited until old age. This enabled him to take control of the entire trade chain in the Indienne business, a sector that was decisive for his economic rise.

Jacques-Louis de Pourtalès created an industrial, commercial and financial empire that was active in Europe, India, Africa and America. In addition to his role as a successful merchant, he was also a plantation owner and banker. His involvement in overseas trade meant that a significant part of his wealth came from colonial trade and slavery. He was involved both directly and indirectly in the slave trade, for example through the purchase of plantations on Grenada in 1770, where he employed around 350 slaves for the cultivation of sugar, coffee, cocoa and cotton.

Jacques-Louis de Pourtalès was not only successful with his firm Pourtalès & Cie. (which took six different forms from 1753 until its liquidation in 1801), he also profitably invested his private fortune. When the classic sales system with the purchase of white linen in India and the resale of painted fabrics in Europe collapsed with the Revolutionary and Coalition Wars and the Industrial Revolution in England, Jacques-Louis de Pourtalès reacted immediately: He diversified his capital returns by increasingly investing in real estate funds, shares in limited partnerships and other companies as well as in trade and industry, loans and stocks.

His entrepreneurial spirit and innovation made him an influential figure in the trading world, capable of adapting to changing economic conditions.

In addition to his business success, Jacques-Louis de Pourtalès was also active as a philanthropist. In 1808 he donated 700,000 Swiss francs for a hospital for the poor, which still bears his name today. His merits were honored with awards, including being named an honorary citizen in Fleurier, Valangin, Le Locle and in 1811 Les Ponts-de-Martel. He also owned numerous properties, including the townhouse in the Faubourg de l'Hôpital built by the architect Louis Châtelain (1805–1885) and the Villa La Petite Rochette in Neuchâtel as well as the Hôtel DuPeyrou in the city of Neuchâtel, a country house near Areuse, the former La Lance Charterhouse, a townhouse on the Rue de Richelieu in Paris and the castle Malérargues located in the Cévennes. In 1802 Jacques-Louis de Pourtalès bought the Bohemian lordship of Tloskov, through which he acquired the Austrian knightly rank in 1811. His distribution of assets to his sons and his generous donations for social purposes show his commitment to the community and his desire to leave a positive influence.

When he died, he left behind approximately thirty million Swiss francs despite large losses during the war years.

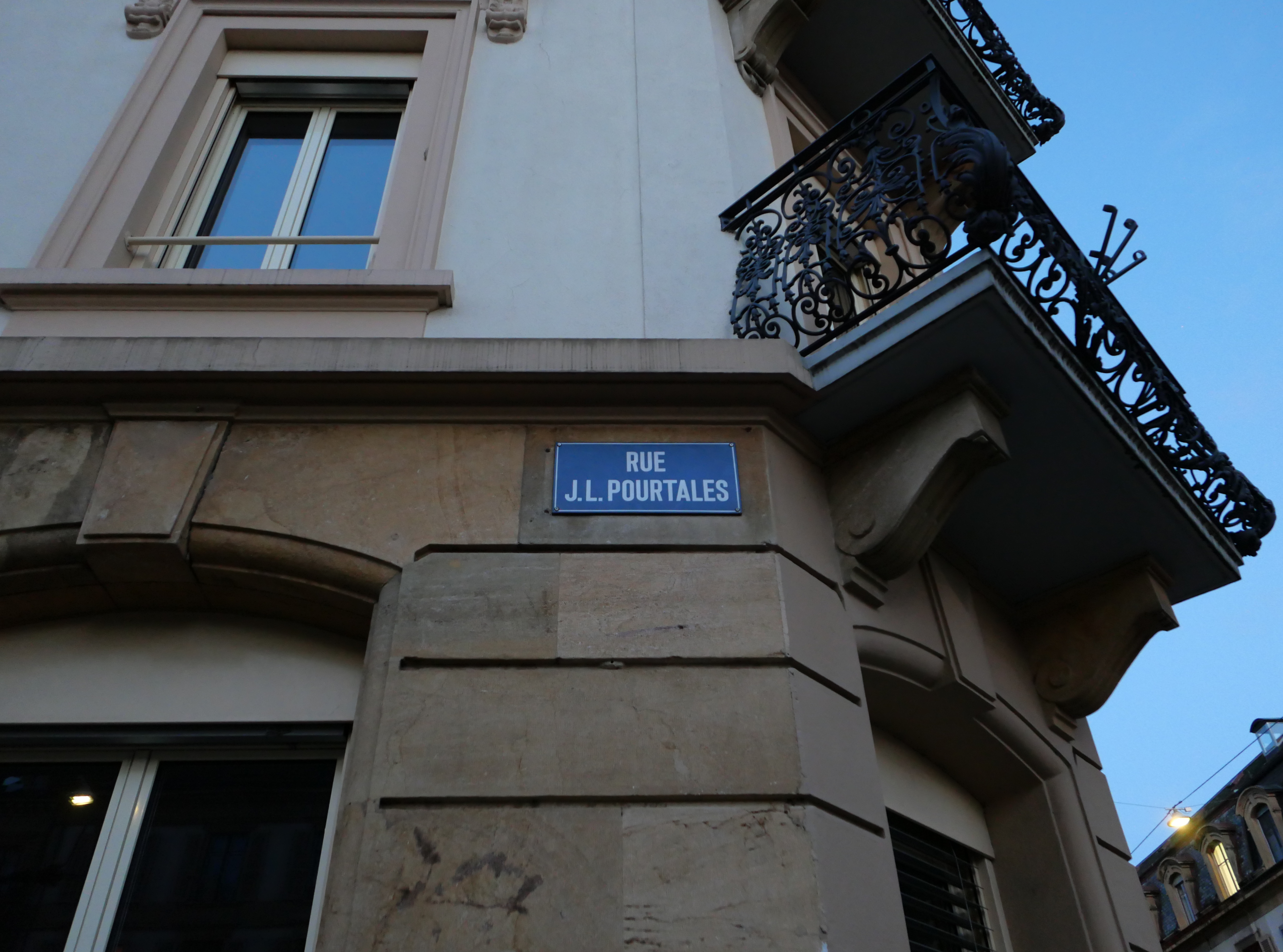
Street sign "Rue J.-L.-Pourtalès" in Neuchâtel

== Honors and awards ==
On 14 February 1850, the Prussian King Frederick William IV elevated the Pourtalès family to the nobility.

In Neuchâtel, the Rue J.-L.-Pourtalès was named after Jacques-Louis de Pourtalès.

== Bibliography ==
- Louis Bergeron: Pourtalès & Cie (1753–1909). In: Annales, Volume 25, No. 2. 1970. pp. 498–517 (Digitalisat).
- Niklaus Röthlin: Koloniale Erfahrungen im letzten Drittel des 18. Jahrhunderts: die Plantagen der Firmen Thurneysen aus Basel und Pourtalès aus Neuchenburg auf der westindischen Insel Grenada. In: Basler Zeitschrift für Geschichte und Altertumskunde, Volume 91. 1991. pp. 129–146 (Digitalisat).
- Myriam Volorio Perriard, Ruth Ammann. "Jacques-Louis de Pourtalès".
