= Council of State of the Canton of Neuchâtel =

Cantonal government of Neuchâtel

- French: Conseil d'État du canton de Neuchâtel; German: Staatsrat des Kantons Neuenburg
- Formation: 1848 (modern form)
- Headquarters: Château de Neuchâtel, Neuchâtel, Switzerland
- Members: 5
- President: Laurent Kurth (2025)
- Website: ne.ch/autorites/CE

The Council of State of the Canton of Neuchâtel is the executive organ of the government of the Canton of Neuchâtel in Switzerland. Comprising five members, it is responsible for implementing laws passed by the Grand Council of Neuchâtel, managing the cantonal administration, and representing the canton in inter-cantonal and federal affairs.

The Council meets at the Château de Neuchâtel and operates as a collegial body, with decisions made collectively and a presidency that rotates annually among its members, based on seniority. Members are elected every four years using a proportional representation system.

== Directorates ==
Each member of the government heads a department (a subdivision of the cantonal administration). The departments are currently named as follows:

- Department of Health, Regions, and Sports (French: Département de la santé, des régions et des sports, DSRS)
- Department of Economy, Security, and Culture (French: Département de l’économie, de la sécurité et de la culture, DESC)
- Department of Education, Finance, and Digitalization (French: Département de la formation, des finances et de la digitalisation, DFFD)
- Department of Territorial Development and Environment (French: Département du développement territorial et de l’environnement, DDTE)
- Department of Employment and Social Cohesion (French: Département de l’emploi et de la cohésion sociale, DECS)

== Members ==
=== 2021–2025 Legislature ===
As of April 2025, the current members of the Council of State, elected for the 2021–2025 term, are:

- Laurent Favre (FDP.The Liberals)
- Alain Ribaux (FDP.The Liberals)
- Crystel Graf (Social Democratic Party)
- Florence Nater (The Centre)
- Laurent Kurth (Social Democratic Party)
- Frédéric Mairy (Social Democratic Party)

Elections occurred on 18 April 2021.

The socialist Frédéric Mairy was elected to replace Laurent Kurth on November 26, 2023. He took office on March 1, 2024.

=== 2017–2021 Legislature ===
The previous legislature (2017–2021) included:

- Jean-Nathanaël Karakash (Social Democratic Party)
- Laurent Favre (FDP.The Liberals)
- Monika Maire-Hefti (Social Democratic Party)
- Alain Ribaux (FDP.The Liberals)
- Laurent Kurth (Social Democratic Party)

Elections took place on 2 April 2017.

== See also ==
- Canton of Neuchâtel
- Grand Council of Neuchâtel
