= Alexandre Girardet =

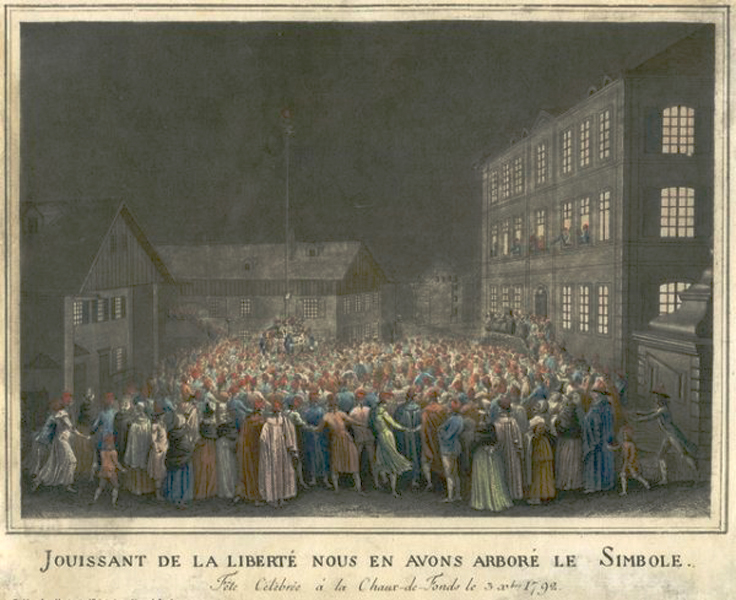
"Enjoying Freedom", festival celebrated at La Chaux-de-Fonds

Alexandre Girardet (22 May 1767, Le Locle - 15 June 1836, Neuchâtel) was a Swiss engraver, illustrator and watercolorist.

== Life and work ==
He was born to Samuel Girardet (1730–1807), a bookseller and publisher, and his wife Marie-Anne, née Bourquin. His siblings, Abraham, Charles Samuel, Abraham Louis, and Julie (1769-1817), also became engravers. He was married to Catherine, née Guion

The brothers all studied engraving together. In 1783, he moved to Paris, to join Abraham, and work under his direction. He signed his works, "A.-G. le jeune", to distinguish them from the two Abrahams. He also painted in oils and watercolors. Among his illustrations are those for the picture book, La Suisse Romande (the French-speaking parts of Switzerland).

In 1792, he and Abraham returned to Switzerland. Two years later, Abraham went back to Paris, and Alexandre took over his position as a teacher. Due to mental illness, he had to give up teaching in 1801. He eventually was forced to give up painting and most of his other activities.

== Sources ==
- "Girardet, Alexandre". In: Ulrich Thieme, Fred. C. Willis (Eds.) Allgemeines Lexikon der Bildenden Künstler von der Antike bis zur Gegenwart, Vol.14: Giddens–Gress. E. A. Seemann, Leipzig 1921, pg.164 (Online)
- René Burnand: L’étonnante histoire des Girardet. Artistes suisses. La Baconnière, Neuenburg 1940.
- Les Girardet. Trois générations d’artistes neuchâtelois XVIIIe et XIXe siècles. Peinture, gravures, dessins. Exposition, Exhibition catalog, 1948
- René Burnand: Les Girardet au Locle et dans le monde. La Baconnière, Neuenburg 1957.
- (in German) Renate Treydel: Girardet, Abraham Louis. In: Allgemeines Künstlerlexikon. Die Bildenden Künstler aller Zeiten und Völker (AKL). Band 55, Saur, München u. a. 2007, ISBN 978-3-598-22795-0, S. 182
