= Abraham Louis Girardet =

Swiss etcher, engraver, and miniaturist

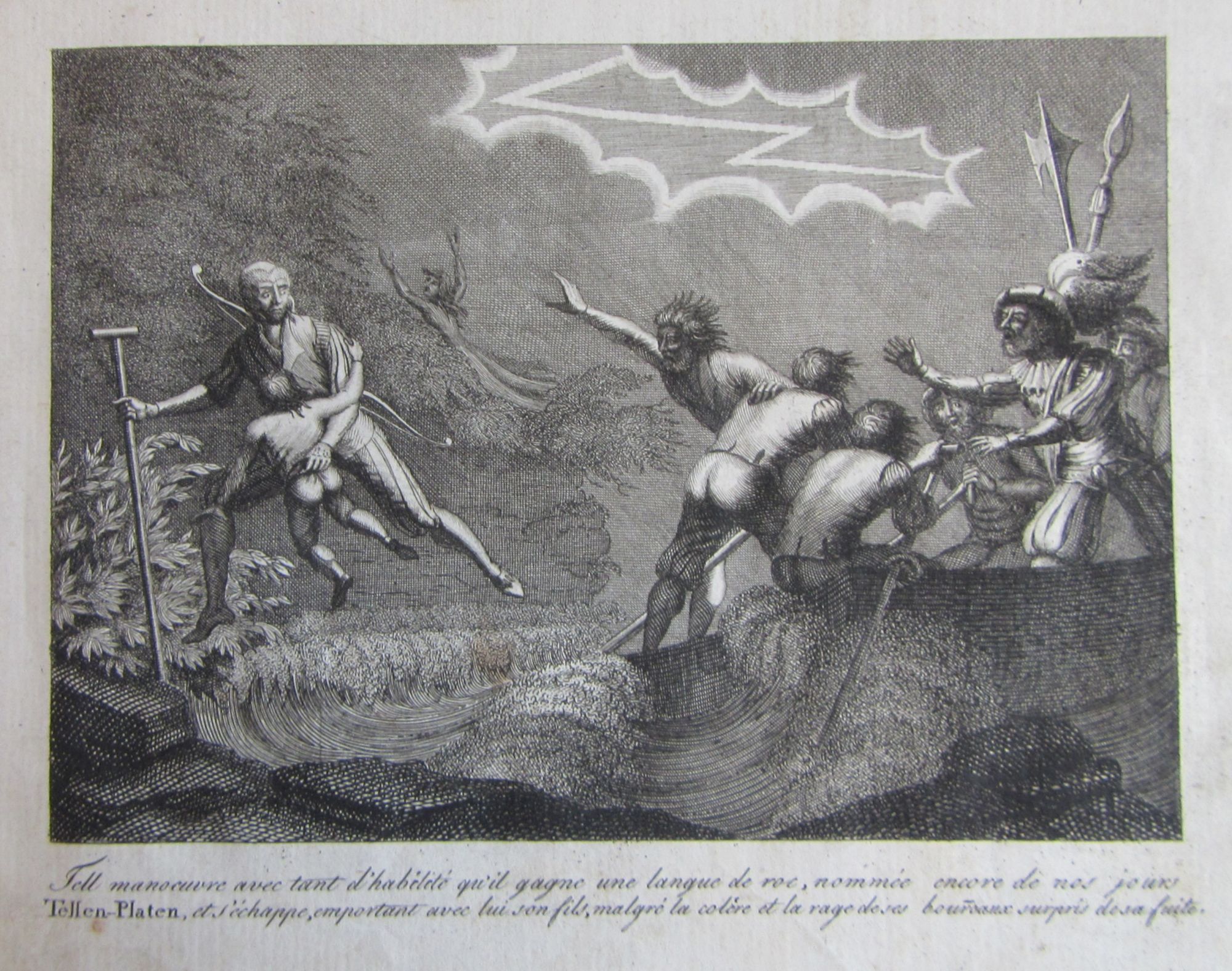
The Liberator of Switzerland (Wilhelm Tell)

Abraham Louis Girardet (27 May 1772, Le Locle - 31 October 1821, Les Planchettes) was a Swiss etcher, engraver and miniaturist.

== Life and work ==
He was born to Samuel Girardet (1730–1807), a bookseller and publisher, and his wife Marie-Anne, née Bourquin. His siblings, Abraham, Charles Samuel, Alexandre and Julie (1769–1817), also became engravers.

He studied painting and graphic design together with his brothers. His works were signed as "Ab-Ls G." or "A.L.G.", to distinguish him from the elder Abraham. He travelled extensively; to France, the Netherlands, and Germany.

From 1789, in addition to the usual scenic views, he created numerous portraits of members of the National Assembly, and satirical illustrations. He also created miniature portraits, as well as hand stamps, for sealing, and engraved tableware.

In 1804, he developed the first symptoms of mental illness. His last years were spent in an institution.

== Sources ==
- "Girardet, Abraham Louis". In: Ulrich Thieme, Fred. C. Willis (Eds.): Allgemeines Lexikon der Bildenden Künstler von der Antike bis zur Gegenwart, Vol.14: Giddens–Gress. E. A. Seemann, Leipzig 1921, pg.164 (Online)
- René Burnand: L’étonnante histoire des Girardet. Artistes suisses. La Baconnière, Neuenburg 1940.
- René Burnand: Les Girardet au Locle et dans le monde. La Baconnière, Neuenburg 1957.
- (in German) Renate Treydel: Girardet, Abraham Louis. In: Allgemeines Künstlerlexikon. Die Bildenden Künstler aller Zeiten und Völker (AKL). Band 55, Saur, München u. a. 2007, ISBN 978-3-598-22795-0, S. 182
