= Gedeon Romandon =

Italian court painter

Gedeon Romandon (1667, Venice – 1697, Berlin) was a court painter to Frederick William, Elector of Brandenburg and his son Frederick III (later King Frederick I). He was the son of the French Huguenot painter Abraham Romandon, who was recorded in Venice in 1663 - Abraham fled France in 1685 due to the revocation of the Edict of Nantes, arriving in Berlin with his family the following year.

== Sources ==
- Friedrich Nicolai: Nachrichten von den Baumeistern ... und andern Künstlern, welche ... in und um Berlin sich aufgehalten haben. Berlin und Stettin 1786.
- Rudolf G. Scharmann.: Schloss Charlottenburg. Königliches Preußen in Berlin. Prestel-Verlag, München u. a., 4. Aufl. 2010.
