= Grand Council of Neuchâtel =

Grand Council of Neuchâtel Grand Conseil du canton de Neuchâtel
- 52nd Legislature

Type
- Type: unicameral

Structure
- Political groups: FLP/PLR (30) SP/PS (27) Greens (15) SVP/UDC (12) PdA/POP (8) GLP/PVL (5) The Centre (3)

Elections
- Last election: 23 March 2025
- Next election: 2029

Meeting place
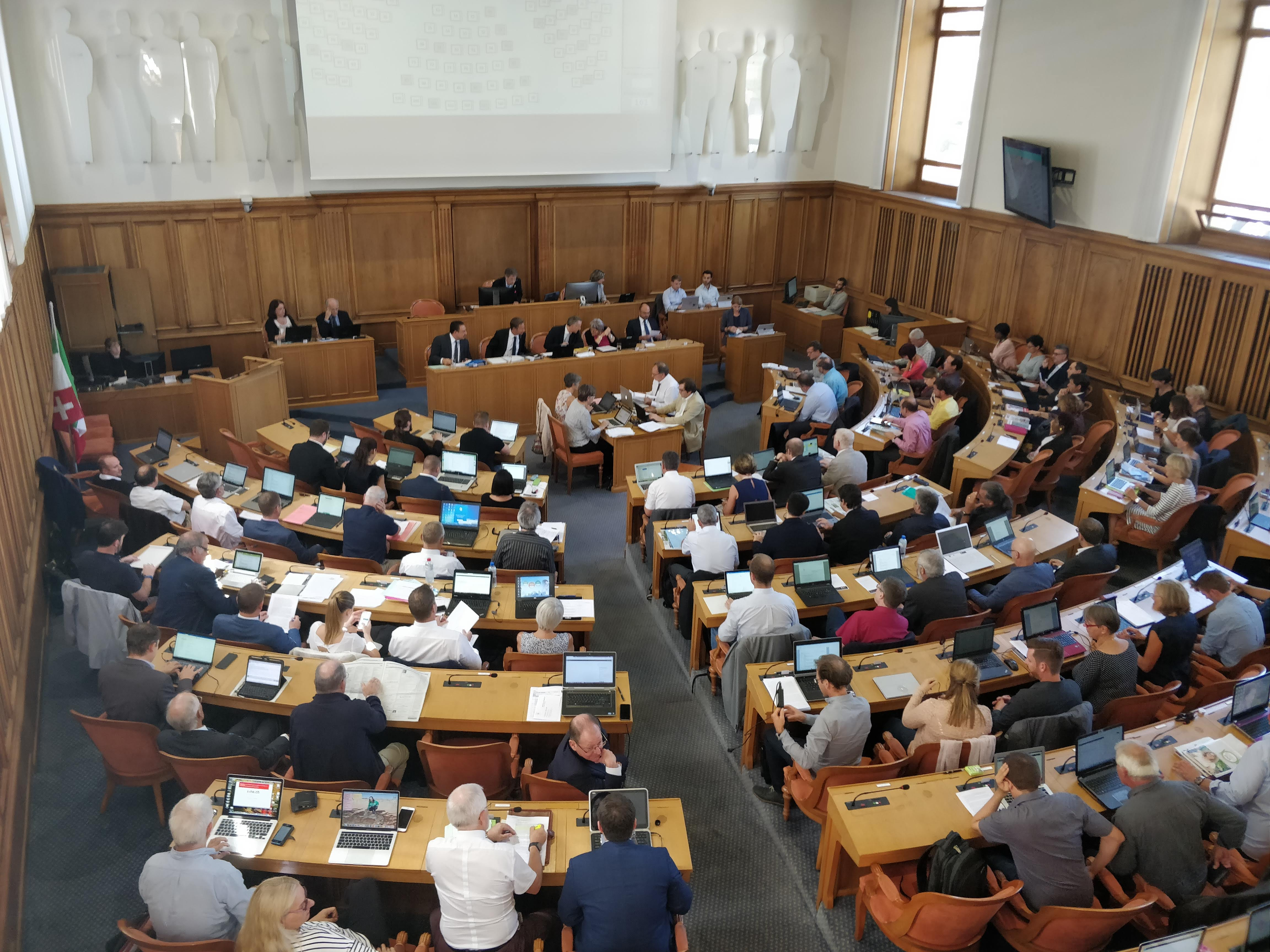
- Hemicycle of the Grand Council of Neuchâtel, in Neuchâtel Castle

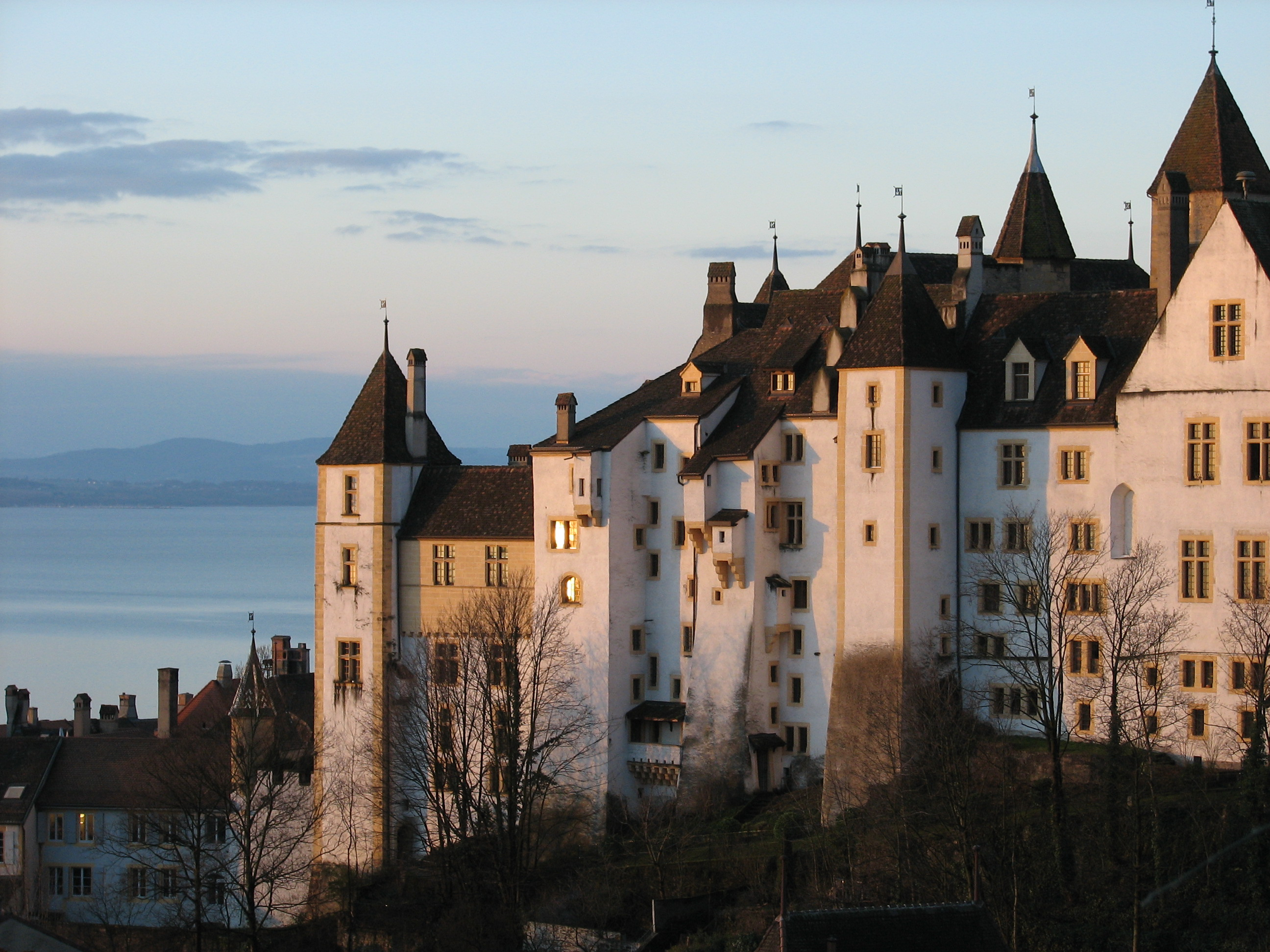
Neuchâtel Castle, where the Grand Council of Neuchâtel meets

The Grand Council of Neuchâtel (French: Grand Conseil du canton de Neuchâtel) is the legislature of the canton of Neuchâtel, in Switzerland. Neuchâtel, styled as a Republic and Canton (République et Canton), has a unicameral legislature. The Grand Council has 100 seats, with members elected every four years.

== 2021 election ==
The election of the Grand Council for the 2021-2025 legislature took place on 18 April 2021. This new legislature saw the number of deputies fall from 115 to 100, elected within a single electoral constituency at the cantonal level, replacing the former election by districts. The election is also marked by the rejuvenation of the elected members, with an average age of 44, compared to 48 in the previous legislature.

The election of 18 April 2021 saw a historic score for the election of women in a Swiss cantonal parliament and, for the first time in the history of the Grand Council of Neuchâtel, women were in the majority, with 58 out of 100 deputies. Solidarity did not reach the quorum and is no longer represented in the Grand Council.

For the 2021-2025 legislature, the distribution of seats is as follows:

- PLR.The Liberal-Radicals: 32 seats
- Socialist Party: 21 seats
- Greens: 19 seats
- Green Liberal Party: 8 seats
- Democratic Union of the Centre: 8 seats
- Swiss Party of Labour: 8 seats
- The Centre: 4 seats

The elected members take office on 25 May 2021.

== 2017 election ==
On 2 April 2017, PLR.The Liberal-Radicals won a plurality, with 43 of the 115 seats. They supplanted the Socialists, who won 32. The Greens (17 seats), Democratic Union of the Centre (9 seats), Swiss Party of Labour (8 seats), Green Liberal Party (4 seats), Solidarity (2 seats), and Christian Democratic Party (2 seats) also won representation.

== See also ==
- Politics of Switzerland

== Archive sources ==
- CHA, Fonds: Chancellerie d'État (1848-2015). Archives de l'État de Neuchâtel.
