= Charles Samuel Girardet =

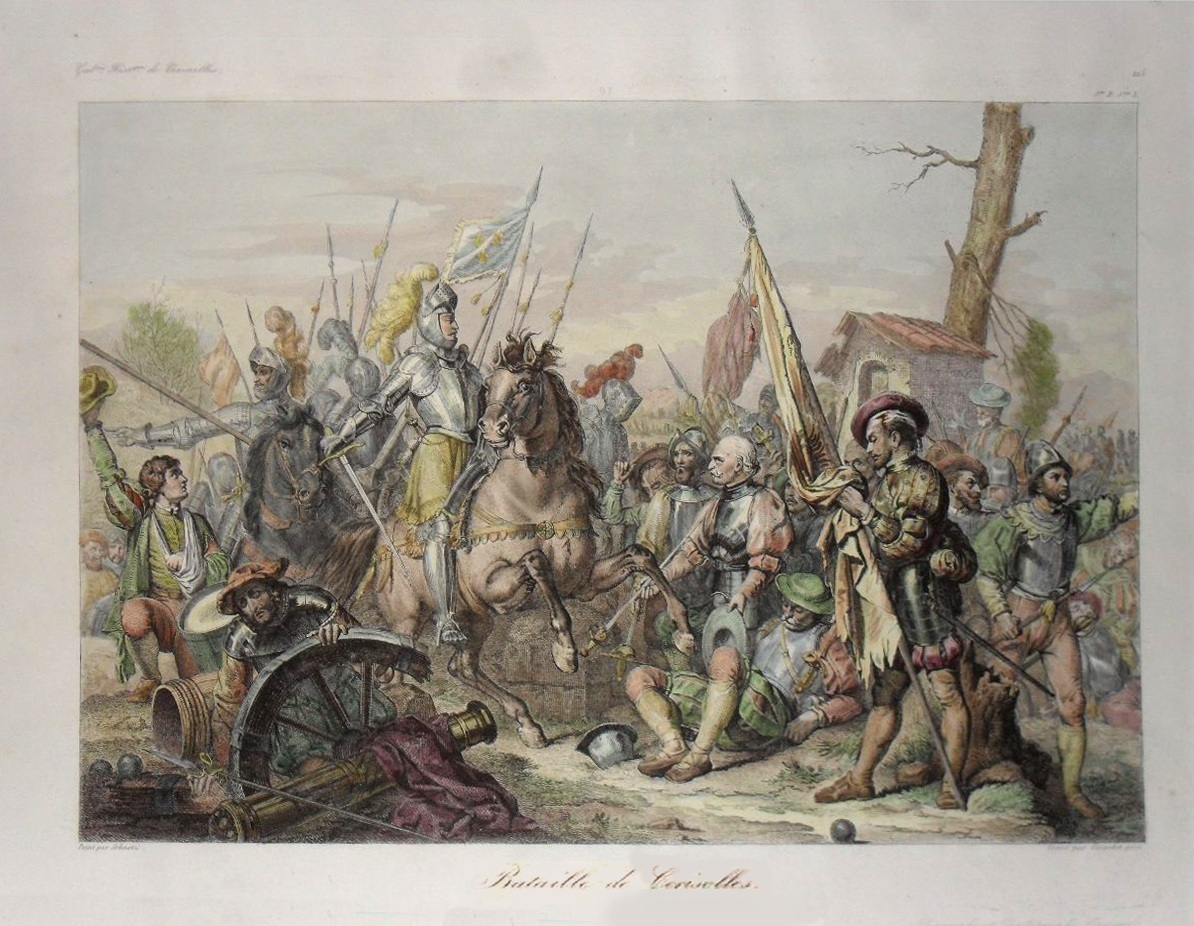
The Battle of Ceresole

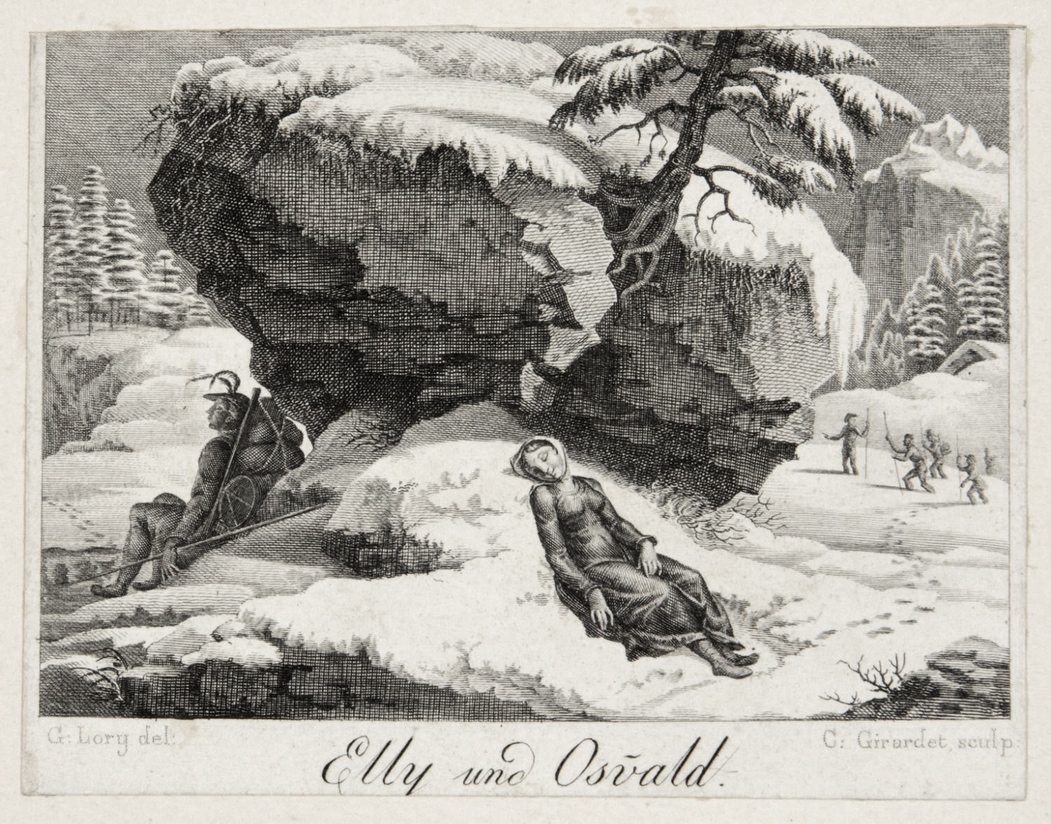
Illustration for Elly and Oswald (A Swiss folk legend)

Charles Samuel Girardet (24 November 1780, Le Locle - 16 January 1863, Versailles) was a Swiss engraver and lithographer, who spent much of his life in Paris.

== Life and work ==
He was born to Samuel Girardet (1730–1807), a bookseller and publisher, and his wife, Marie-Anne, née Bourquin. His siblings, Abraham, Abraham Louis, Alexandre and Julie (1769–1817), also became engravers.

He and his brothers studied engraving together. In 1805, he went to Paris to join Abraham, who helped provide the financial assistance he needed to complete his training and get started. In 1812, he was introduced to lithography and illustrated the Histoires de la Bible, by Johann Hübner. In 1813, he returned to his hometown, and was active there until 1822.

In 1823, he went back to Paris, where he conducted studies in the process of engraving reliefs on stone. In 1831, he was awarded a gold medal by the "Société d'encouragement à l'industrie nationale", for his application of lithography to the field of typography.

He was the first teacher of Louis Léopold Robert. His sons, Karl, Edouard and Paul, also became printmakers and painters.
