= Neuchâtel Castle =

Castle in Neuchâtel, Switzerland

- Château de Neuchâtel
- Neuchâtel
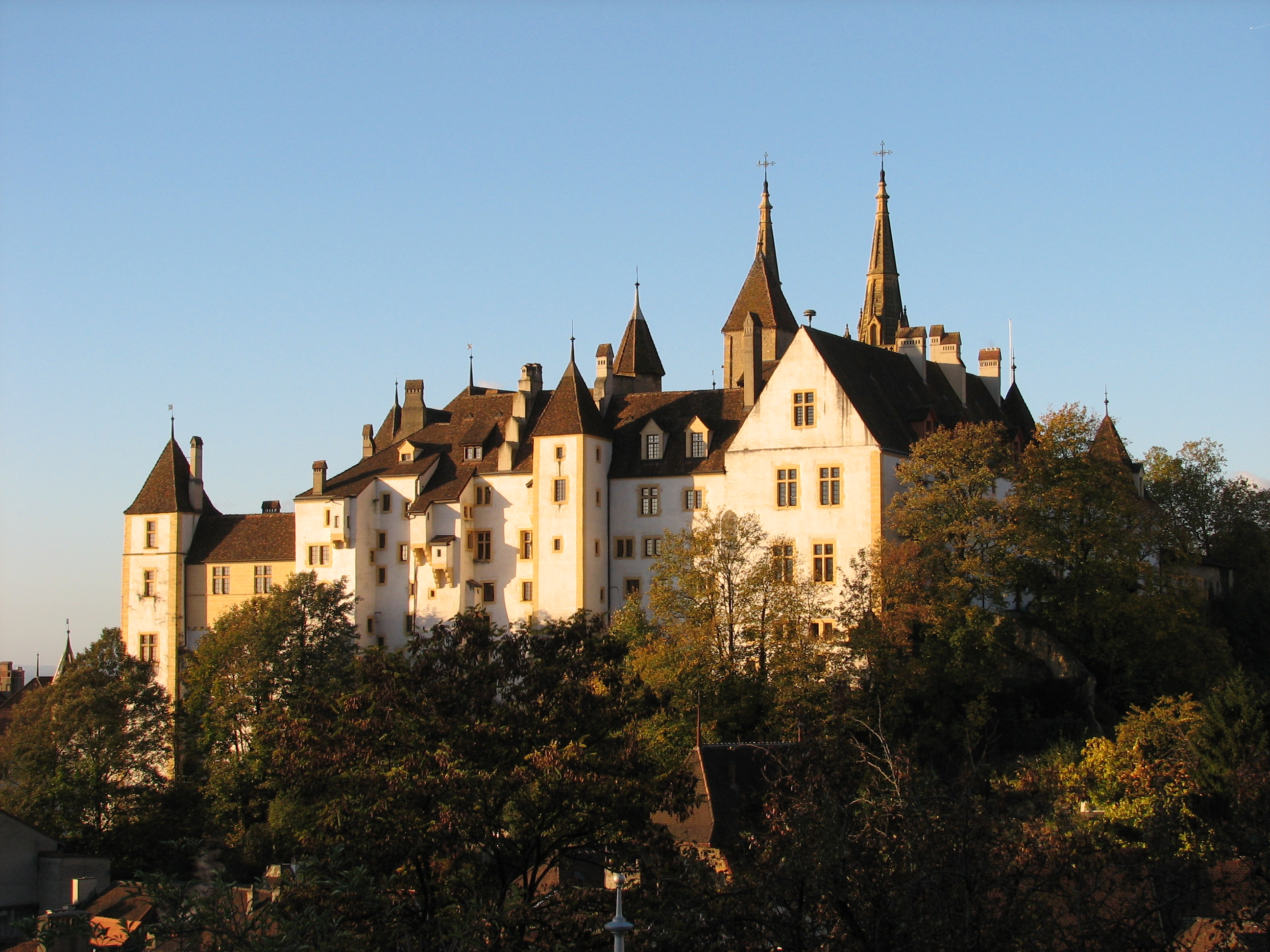

Site information
- Code: CH-NE
- Condition: preserved

Location
- Coordinates: 46°59′32″N 6°55′37″E
- Height: 450 m above the sea

Neuchâtel Castle is a castle in the municipality of Neuchâtel of the Canton of Neuchâtel in Switzerland. It is a Swiss heritage site of national significance.

== See also ==
- List of castles in Switzerland
- Château
