= Girardet =

Girardet is a surname. Articles include:

- Edward Girardet (born 1951), American journalist
- Frédy Girardet (born 1936), Swiss chef
- Herbert Girardet (born 1943), German-born British environmentalist and author
- Raoul Girardet (1917-2013), French historian
- Véronique Girardet (born 1965), French sport shooter
- The Girardet family of artists
  - Abraham Girardet (1764-1823), Swiss engraver
  - Alexandre Girardet (1767–1836), Swiss engraver
  - Abraham Louis Girardet (1772-1821), Swiss engraver
  - Charles Samuel Girardet (1780-1863), Swiss engraver and lithographer
    - Karl Girardet (1813-1871), Swiss-French engraver
    - Edouard Girardet (1819–1880), Swiss-French engraver and painter
      - Henri Girardet (1848–1917), Swiss-French lithographer and painter
    - Paul Girardet (1821–1893), Swiss-French engraver
      - Eugène Girardet (1853-1907), French painter
      - Jules Girardet (1856-1938), French painter
      - Léon Girardet (1856-1895), French painter, Jules' twin brother
      - Paul Armand Girardet (1859-1915), French painter and engraver.
      - Théodore Girardet (1861-1935), French engraver
- Berthe Girardet (1861-1948), French sculptor, Paul Armand's wife
