= Eugène Burnand =

Swiss artist (1850–1921)

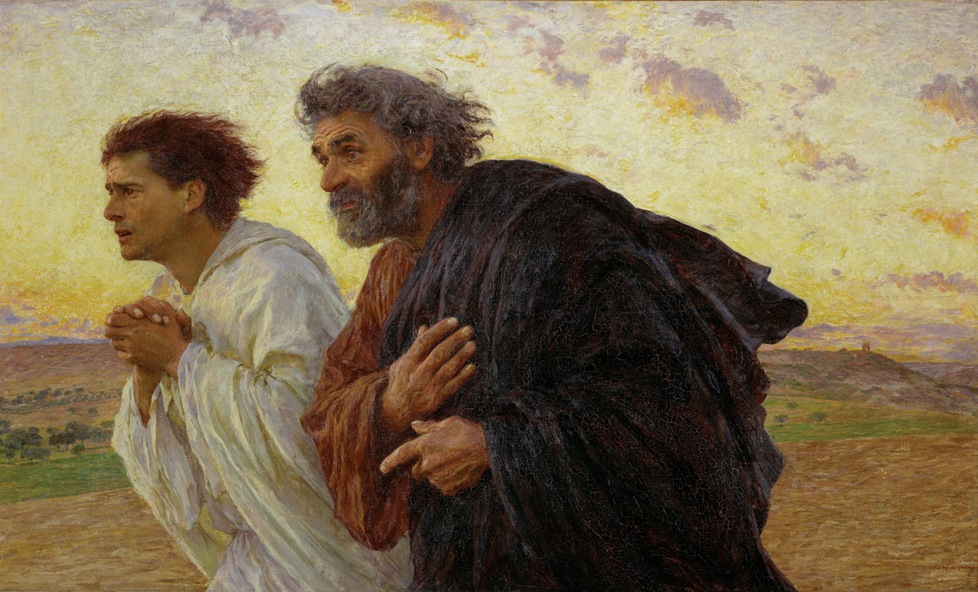
The Disciples Peter and John running to the sepulchre on the morning of the Resurrection, 1889 (Musée d'Orsay, Paris)

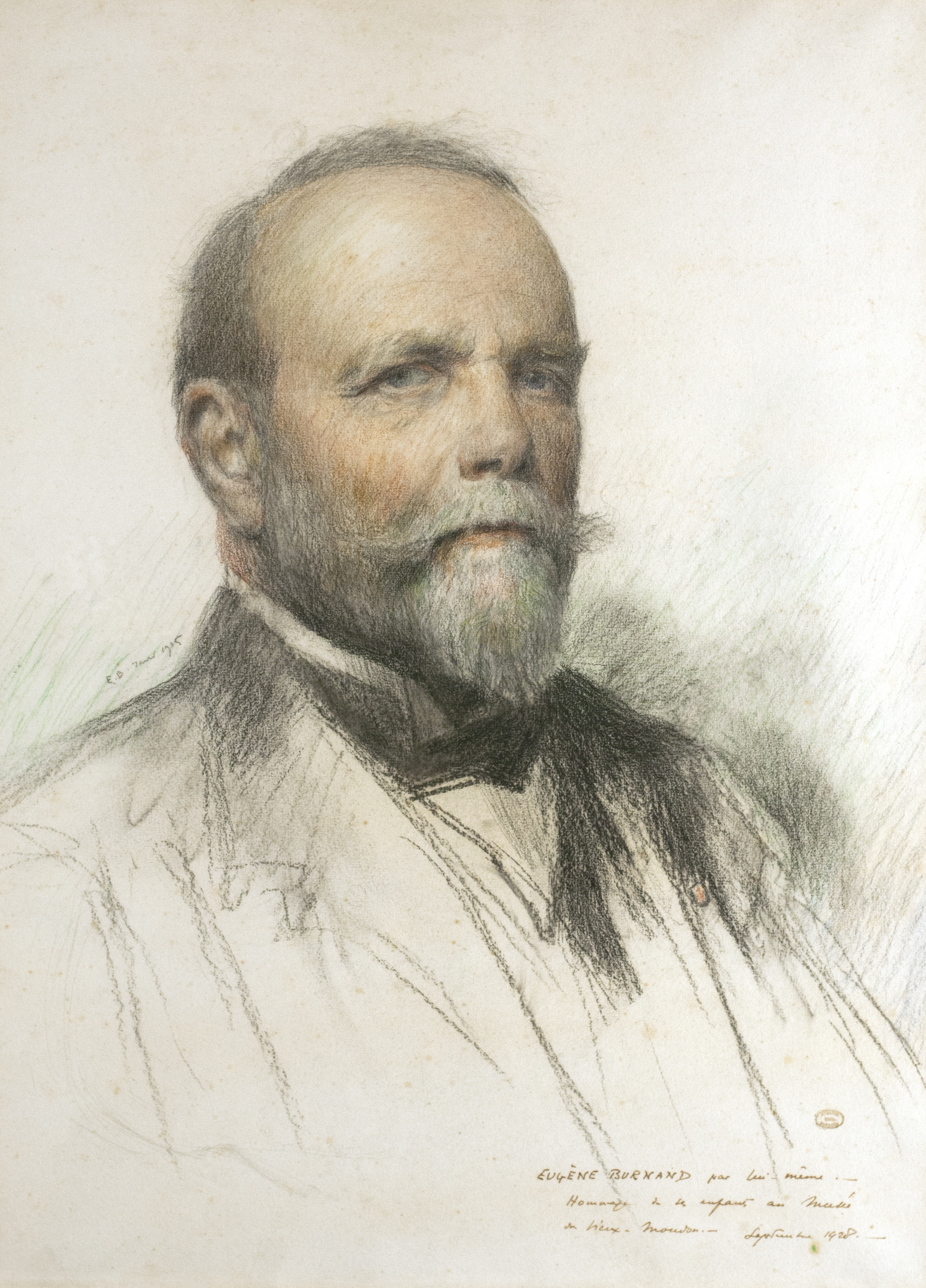
Eugène Burnand pastel and pencil self-portrait 1915

Eugène Burnand (French: [øʒɛn byʁnɑ̃]; 30 August 1850 – 4 February 1921) was a Swiss painter and illustrator. Born of prosperous parents who taught him to appreciate art and the countryside, he first trained as an architect but quickly realised his vocation was painting. He studied art in Geneva and Paris then settled in Versailles. In the course of his life he travelled widely and lived at various times in Florence, Montpellier, Seppey (Moudon) and Neuchâtel. His later years were spent in Paris where he died a celebrated and well respected artist both in Switzerland and France.

He was primarily a realist painter of nature. Most of his works were of rural scenes, often with animals, the depiction of which he was a master. He increasingly painted human figures and by the end of his career could be called a portraitist whose skill revealing character was profound.

A deeply religious man, his Protestant beliefs led him to include more religious works that he put his stamp of realism on, and he became best known in Europe for his illustrations of "The Parables", that was published in French, German and English versions over four decades. His works are now widely distributed in museums and private collections throughout the world and in his own dedicated museum in Moudon. His final project was a series of 104 pastel portraits of allied WWI participants of all nationalities that was incomplete when he died; a unique body of work that was subsequently published as a book in 1922 and recently republished in 2010.

Eugene Burnand was a family man who kept detailed records of his life and work, facilitating a thorough understanding of his methods and motives. His family, consisting of his wife Julia and eight children including two sets of twins, moved with him as his work took him around France and Switzerland. His traditional style ensured a conventional appreciation that he and his family enjoyed, but brought some criticism and conflict with contemporaries who were embracing modern art.

Burnand was greatly influenced by artists such as Jean-François Millet and Gustave Courbet. This is reflected in perhaps his best known work, The Disciples Peter and John Running to the Sepulchre on the Morning of the Resurrection 1898, which hangs in the Musée d'Orsay in Paris.

== Biography ==
=== Early life ===
Eugène Burnand was born on 30 August 1850 in Chateau Billens, the property of his grandfather Charles Burnand, in Moudon, Vaud, Switzerland, a French speaking region north of Lausanne. His parents, (Colonel) Édouard Burnand and Henriette (née Foltz) were part of the Protestant bourgeois establishment of the town. His father was a forestry inspector who travelled considerably, invented the Prélaz-Burnand rifle in 1859 and had "the gifts and temperament of an artist, and drew and painted all his life as an amateur".

Eugène was the youngest of three surviving children. His older brothers had already left home when he was born and were working in France. The family soon moved to Chateau Carouge in the Moudon Ville Haute. Both his parents were well educated and cultured and he had a mature relationship with them. He travelled often with his father throughout the Canton of Vaud in the course of his work and this instilled in him a love of, and familiarity with the region. Up to the age of ten his formal education was in Moudon. The family moved to Florence in late 1860 where his father was charged with introducing the Prélaz-Burnand rifle to the Tuscan army. Seven months later they returned to Switzerland and set up residence in Schaffhausen, but meantime Eugène had done well at school in Florence and its artistic heritage had made a lasting impression on him. His secondary education continued in Schaffhouse in German and in 1867 he somewhat reluctantly took his father's advice to study architecture at Zurich so he might have a reliable means of earning a living. His artistic talents shone however, and he changed over to study painting, and after four years in Zurich he gained his architecture diploma and went to Geneva to study for a short time under the celebrated Barthélemy Menn whose style he greatly admired.

=== Artistic career, 1872 to 1895 ===
In 1872 he entered the Fine Arts School in Paris under Jean-Léon Gérôme and he later became a pupil. He spent time with his brother Ernest in Provence in 1873 and loved this region in which he painted many scenes over the years. One of his first works from that time 'Donkeys in the Midi' is shown here. In 1877 he spent time in Florence and Rome but returned to France the following year when he married and settled in Versailles, acquiring new skills from the workshop of his wife's family, who were the well known painters and engravers Girardet.

He produced many successful paintings of animals in Provence, particularly in the Camargue region. 'Troupeau de boeufs au bord de la mer" was another typical study at this time. In 1879 he produced one of his impressive large works, 'La Pompe à Feu' measuring 200 x 310 cm, an action picture with men and horses. The beautiful and sunny 'Gleaners' followed in 1880. He became publicly noticed in 1884 with the publication of 'Mireille', an epic poem by Frédéric Mistral illustrated by Burnand. The same year he produced 'Bull in the Alps', another large striking picture which further demonstrated his skill painting animals.

He moved to Paris in 1885 and stayed four years, during which time he, with other Swiss artists organised the Swiss fine arts section for the Paris International Exhibition of 1889, a task that caused some difficult relationships with other artists later on. Moving from Paris to Montpellier he completed 'La Descente des troupaux' 200 x 120 cm OOC in 1890. He moved back to Switzerland to be near his sick father in 1892 and completed several canvases of Swiss scenes including Lake Geneva. Following the death of his father and soon after his mother in 1894 he remained in the family home at Seppey near Moudon and produced 'The Peasant farmer' and his only major historical painting 'La Fuite de Charles le Téméraire (après la bataille de Morat)', 'The flight of Charles the Bold after the battle of Morat'. By this time he had produced over one hundred catalogued works.

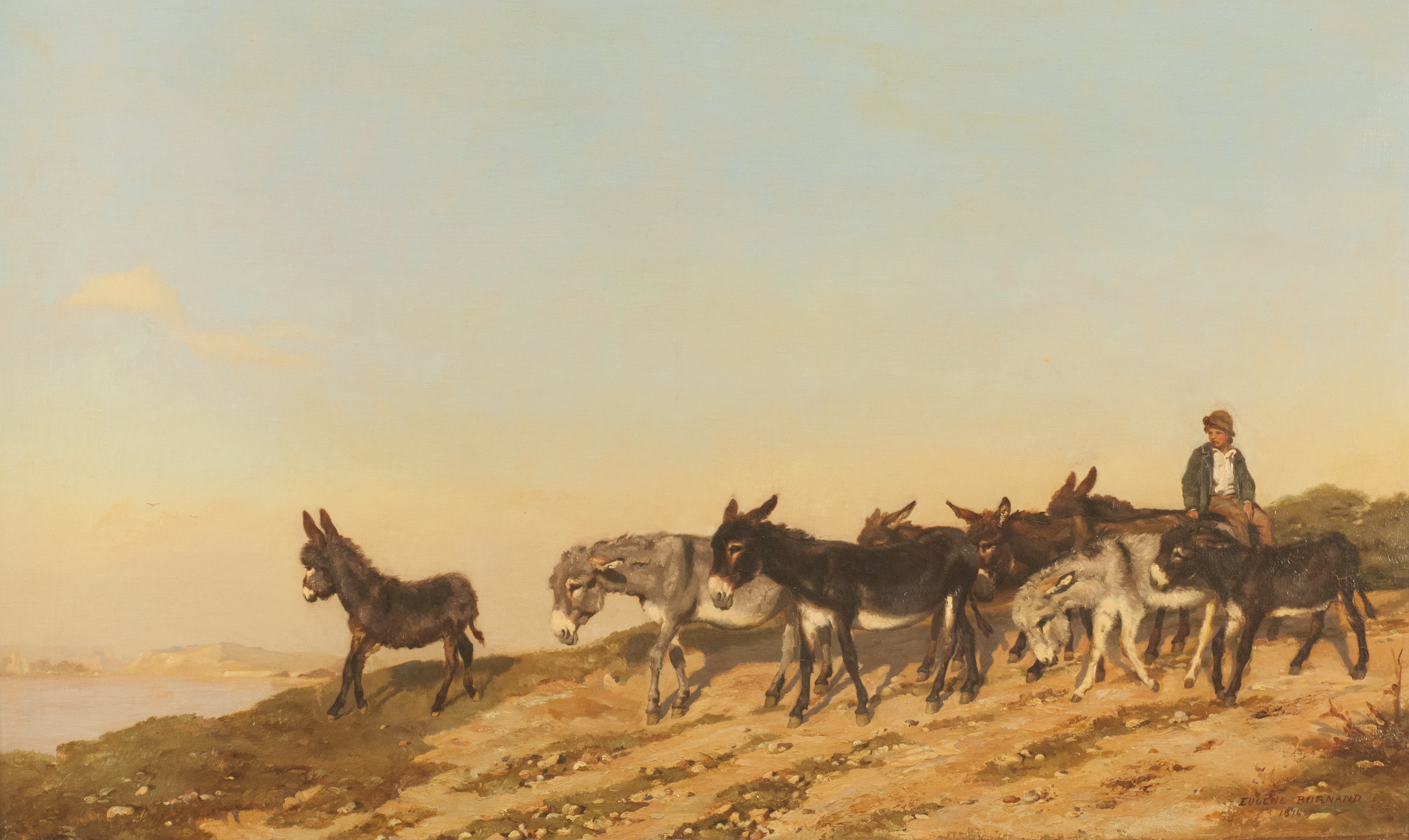
'Les Anes dans le Midi', 'Donkeys in the Midi' 1873 OOC 65 x 90 cm

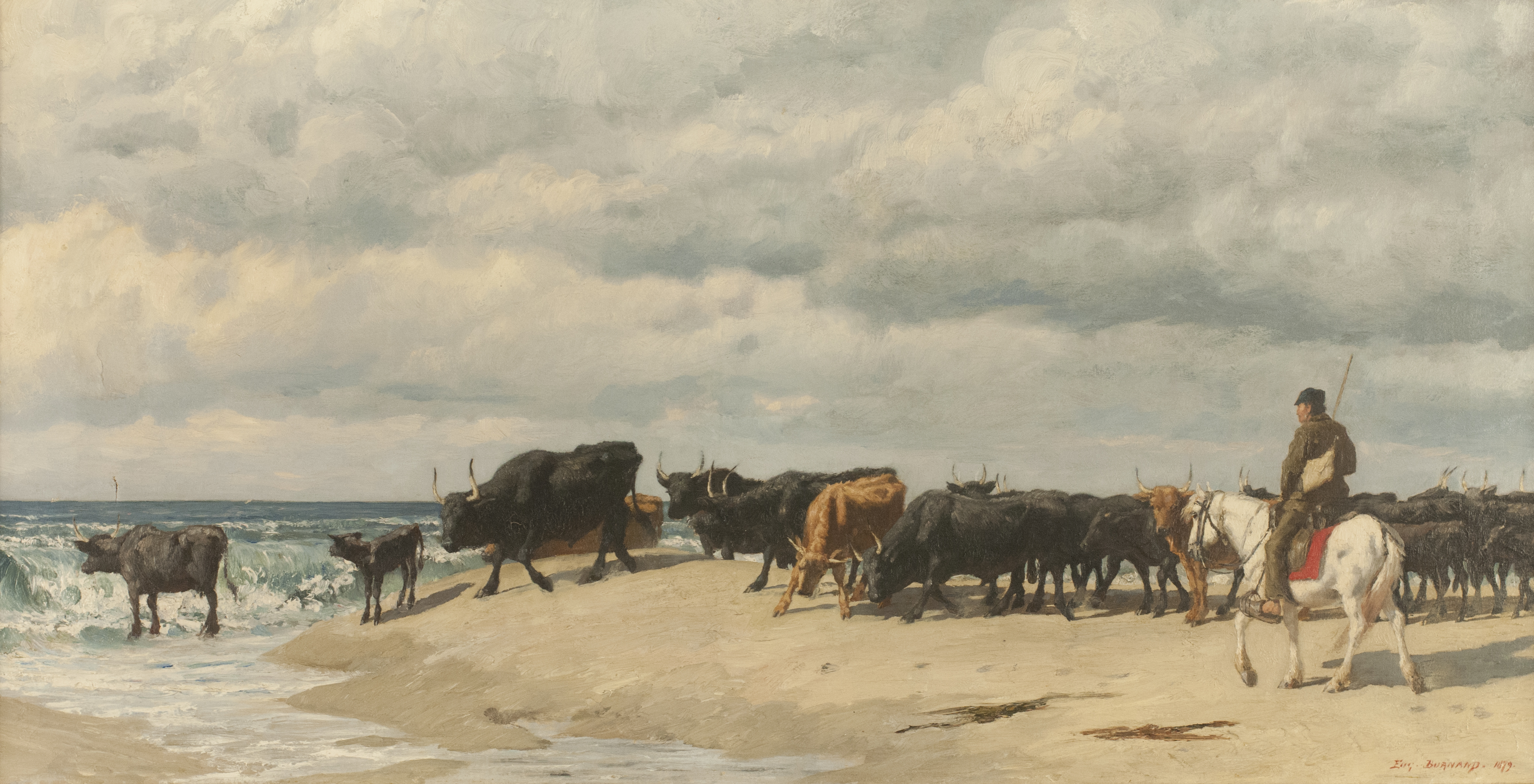
'Troupeau de boeufs au bord de la mer', 'Herd of cattle beside the sea' 1878 OOC 30 x 40 cm

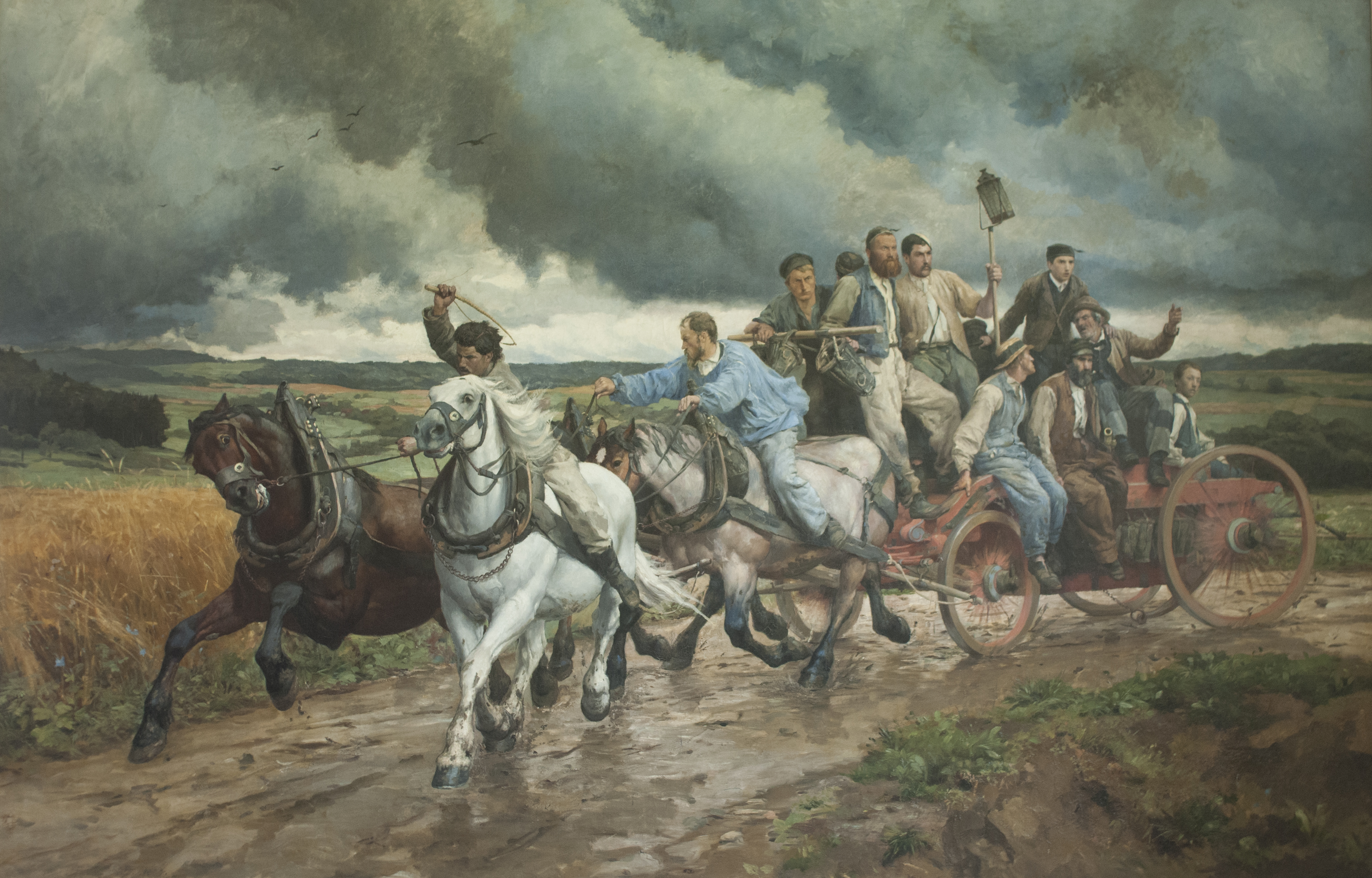
'La Pompe à Feu', 'The Fire Engine' 1879 OOC 200 x 310 cm

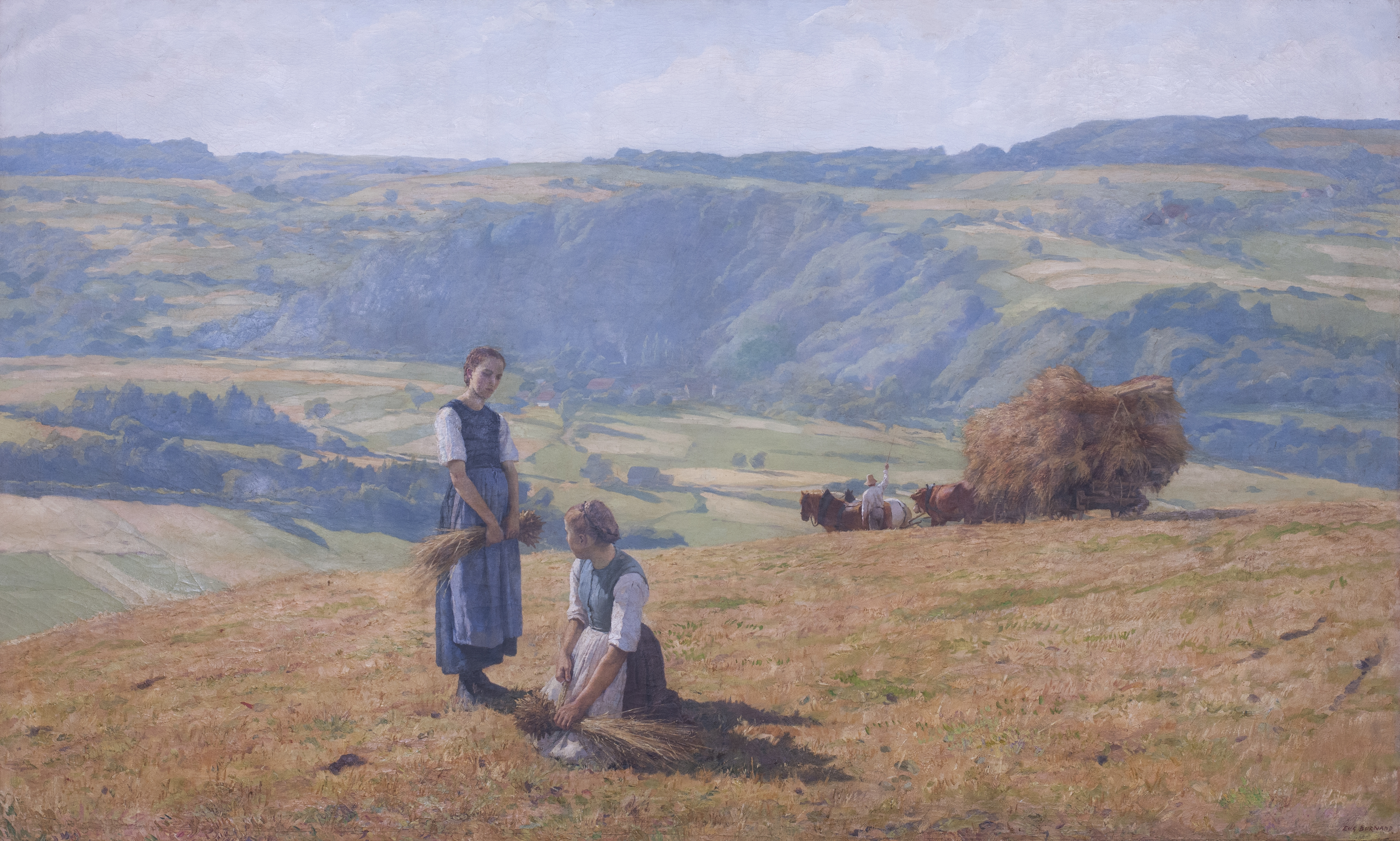
'Les Glaneuses', 'The Gleaners' 1880 OOC 150 x 200 cm

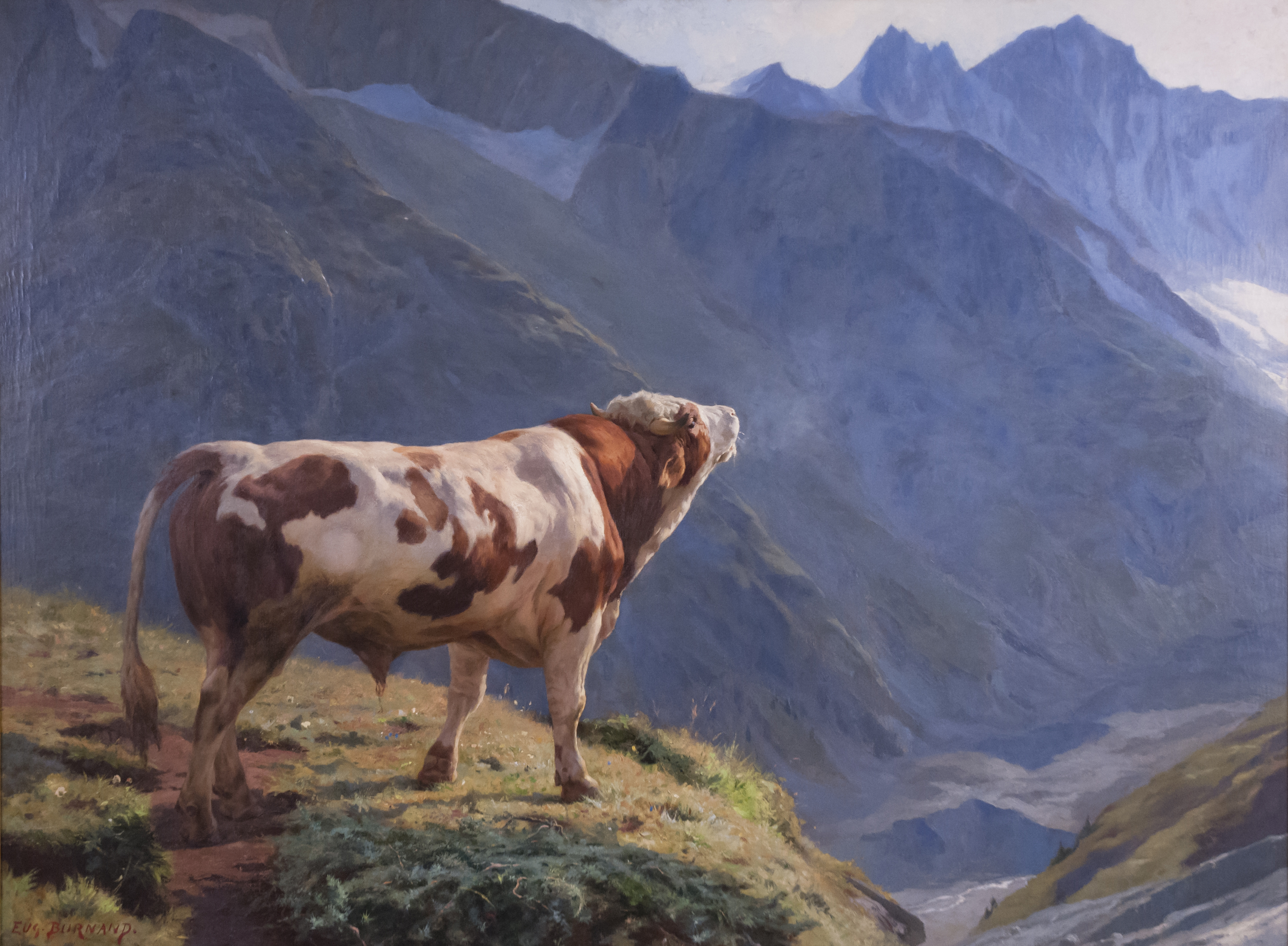
'Taureau dans les Alpes', 'Bull in the Alps' 1884 OOC 200 x 270 cm

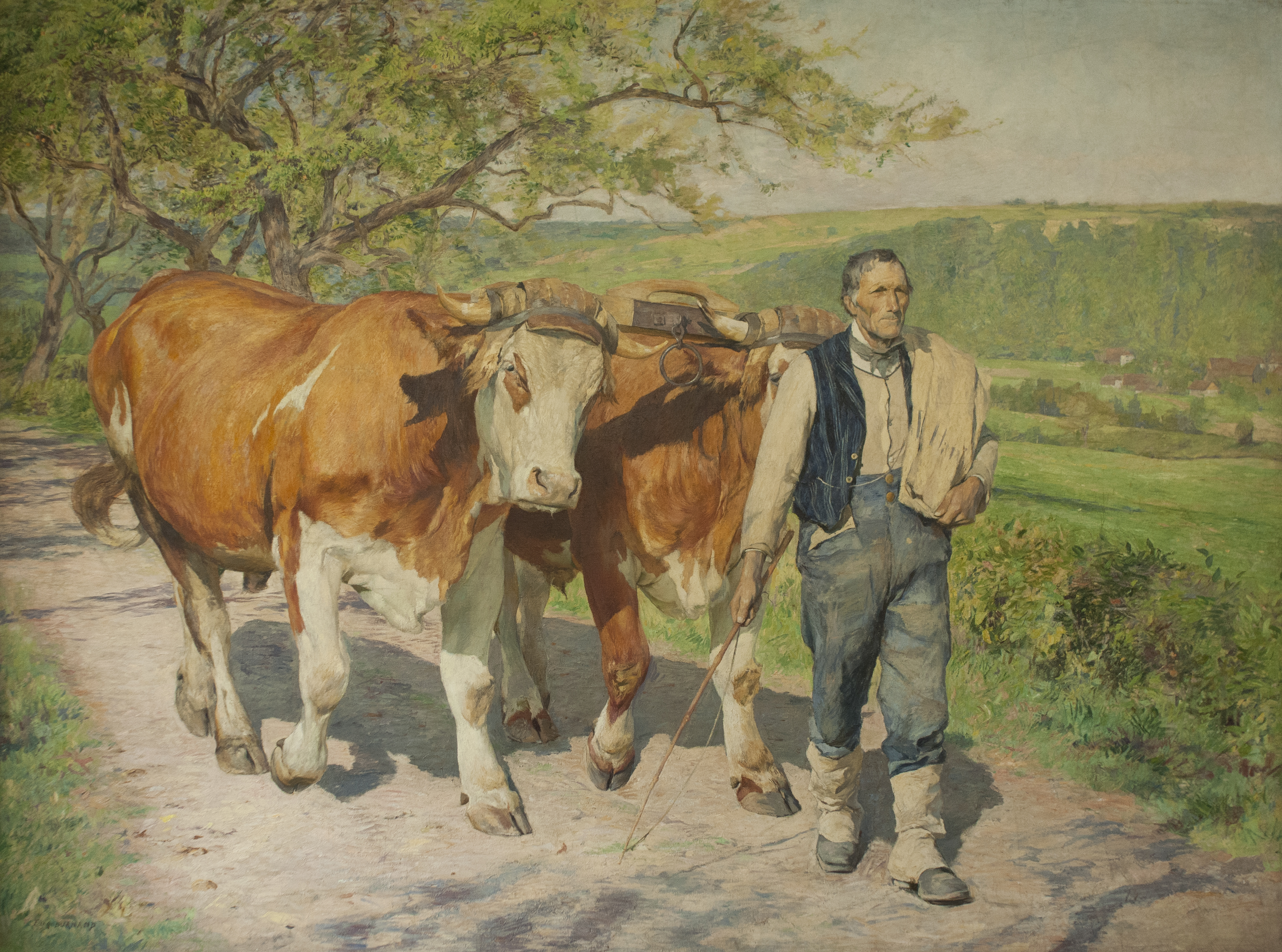
'Le Paysan', 'The Peasant farmer' 1894 OOC 240 x 310 cm

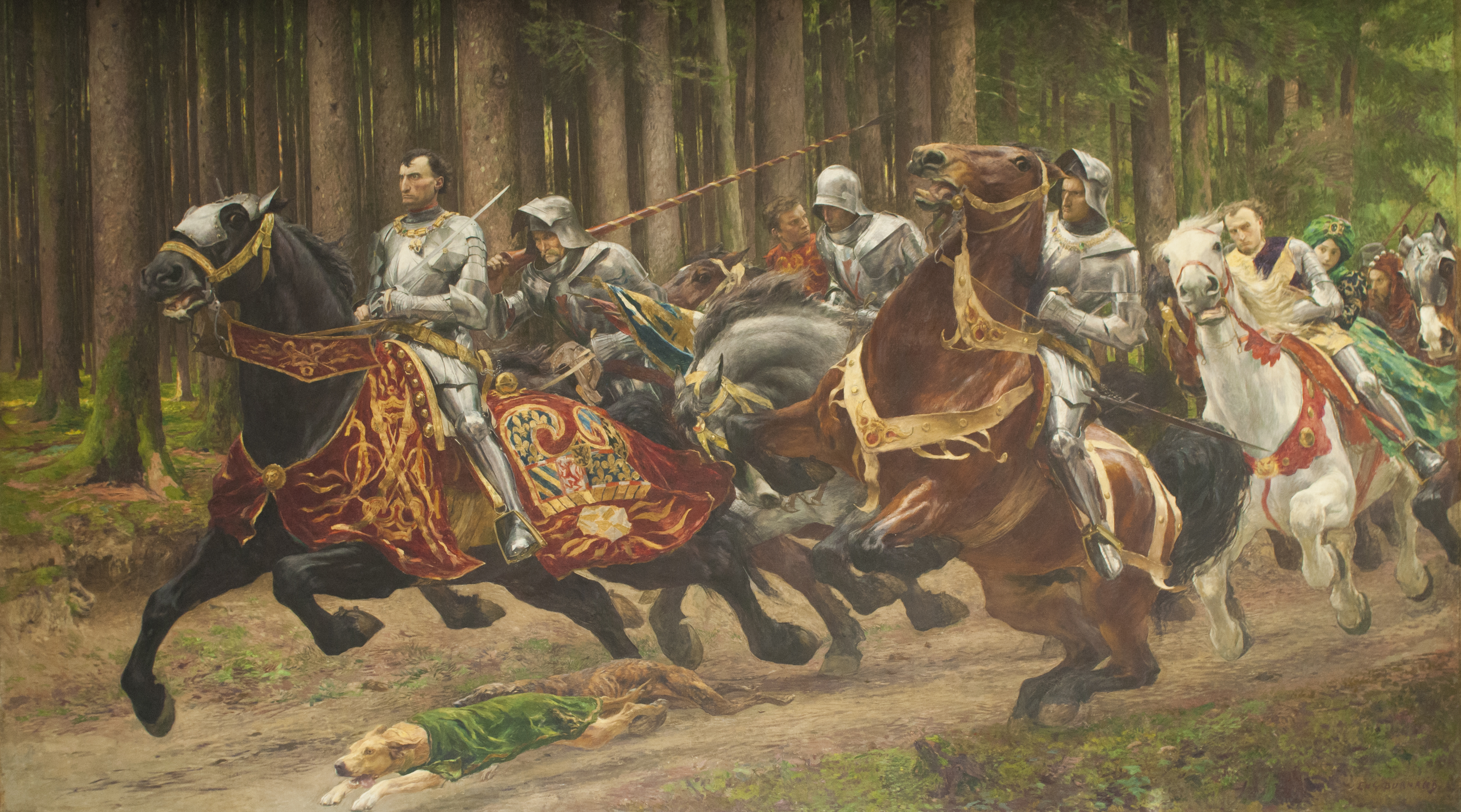
'La Fuite de Charles le Téméraire', 'The Flight of Charles the Bold' 1894–5, OOC 340 x 560 cm

=== Artistic career, 1886 to 1921 ===
His move in late 1895 to a new rural residence at Fontfroide-le-Haut, a few miles from Montpellier, seemed to provide him with the environment and inspiration for a concentration on religious themes for his pictures, notably, 'Retour de l'enfant Prodigue (Return of the prodigal son) 1896-7', 'L'Invitation au festin (Invitation to the feast) 1899, and the picture by which he is now best known, 'Les Disciples Pierre et Jean courant au sépulchre le matin de la Résurrection', 'The Disciples Peter and John running to the sepulchre on the morning of the Resurrection' 1898, which is in the Musée d'Orsay, Paris.

At the start of the 20th century he was at the height of his fame and he and other artists contributed to the ceiling of the now famous "Train Bleu" buffet in the Gare de Lyon, Paris, that at the time was major part of the new building work to mark the Paris International Exhibition of 1900. Burnand painted "Le Mont-Blanc vu de Clergère".

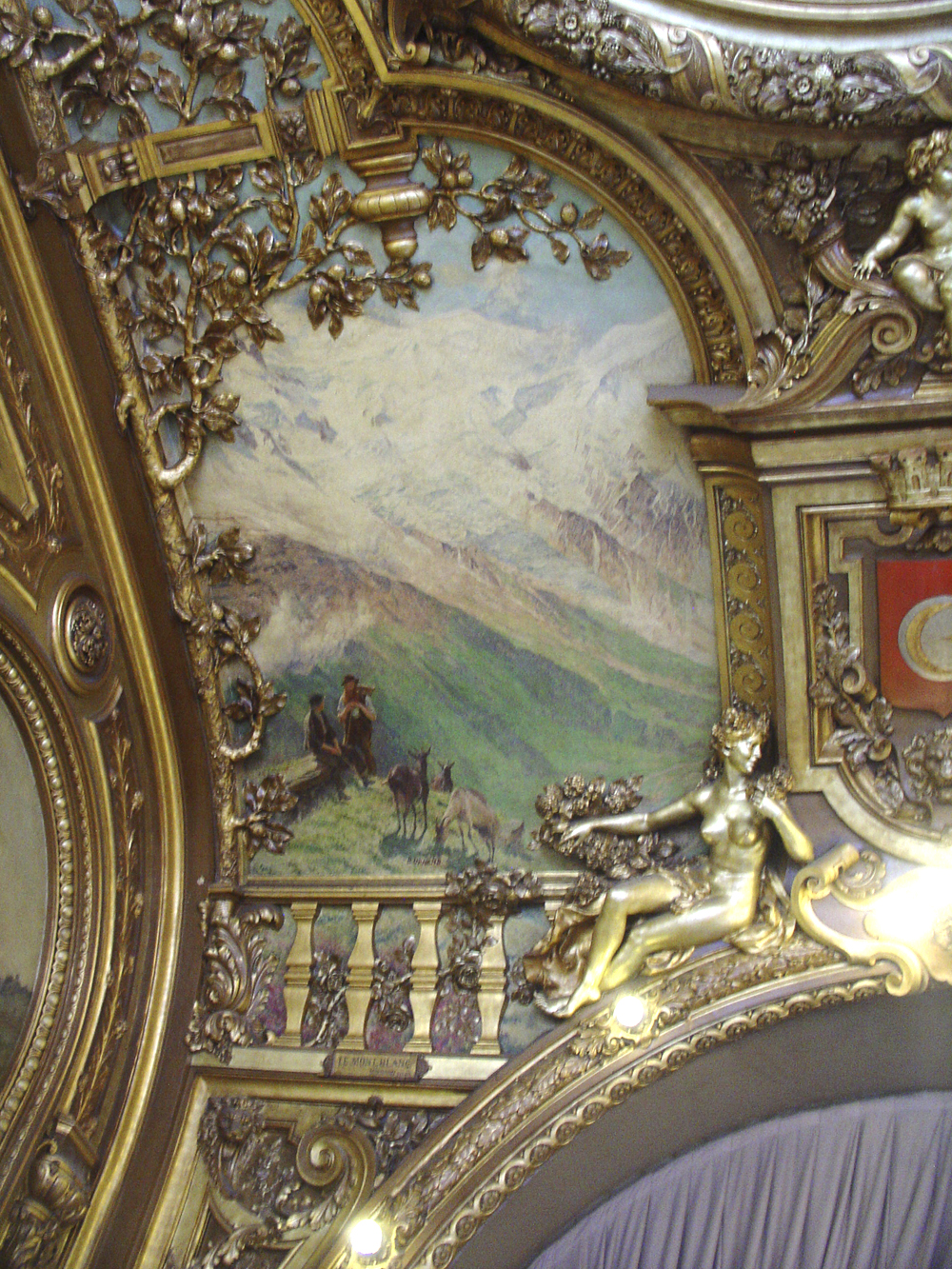
Oil painting on ceiling of the 'Train Bleu", Gare de Lyon buffet, Paris, by Eugène Burnand "Le Mont-Blanc vu de Clergère" 1900

Another large major picture with a religious theme was started in this period, "La Prière sacerdotale", done during a temporary move to Florence for the winter of 1900–1. He changed the head of Christ several times and the final version was done in 1918. As with most of his paintings of this type, he used models from his large circle of friends and neighbours, many of whom were local tradesmen. The individuals in this painting are carefully described in René Burnand's biography of his father.

Before he moved back to Switzerland in 1903 so his family could re-establish their Swiss roots, many other religious works were completed such as "Jésus à Béthanie (Jesus at Bethany)", "L'Invitation au festin (Invitation to the Feast)" and "L'Homme de douleur (Man of sorrow)". The location in which he chose to live back in his native Switzerland was the village of Hauterive, close to Neuchatêl, in a large old house with a terrace with old trees, a setting that provided all the backdrops he needed for his "Les Paraboles" project, that took him most of the four years he spent there. It became a book of thirty-two parables illustrated by 76 paintings, drawings and sketches. It was first published in 1908 in French, later in German, and an English edition in 1948. This book and the pictures from it made him well known, and were very widely used by religious organisations in Europe and throughout the world and can still be found today. The pictures are characterised by uniquely individual people showing the emotion and gravitas of the stories, which he achieved by once again using models from the people in his locality and often his wife Julia for the females required. He believed that religious messages in art should depict everyday people showing their humanity. A web facsimile of his "Parables" in English is available. He also completed the large canvas, "La Voie Douloureuse (Via Dolorosa)" while at Hauterive.

He moved back to Paris with his family in 1907 and it remained his main base until his death. The war years 1914-18 were spent back at Seppey, and there were many trips in the furtherance of painting projects to locations such as Monpellier, Marseille and Assisi where worked on the pictures for the book Little Flowers of St. Francis. He painted "Le samedi saint (Holy Saturday)" 1907–8, and prepared the cartoons for one of his most important works, the stained glass windows of the "Sermon on the Mount" 1910 in the Reformed church at Herzogenbuchsee, near Bern. His series "Types vaudois" at this time, portraits of regional characters of Vaud, probably set the style for his later military types. His last large canvas "Labour dans le Jorat" was done at Seppey in 1915 but was destroyed in a fire at Lausanne in early 1916. He had repainted the canvas within a year.

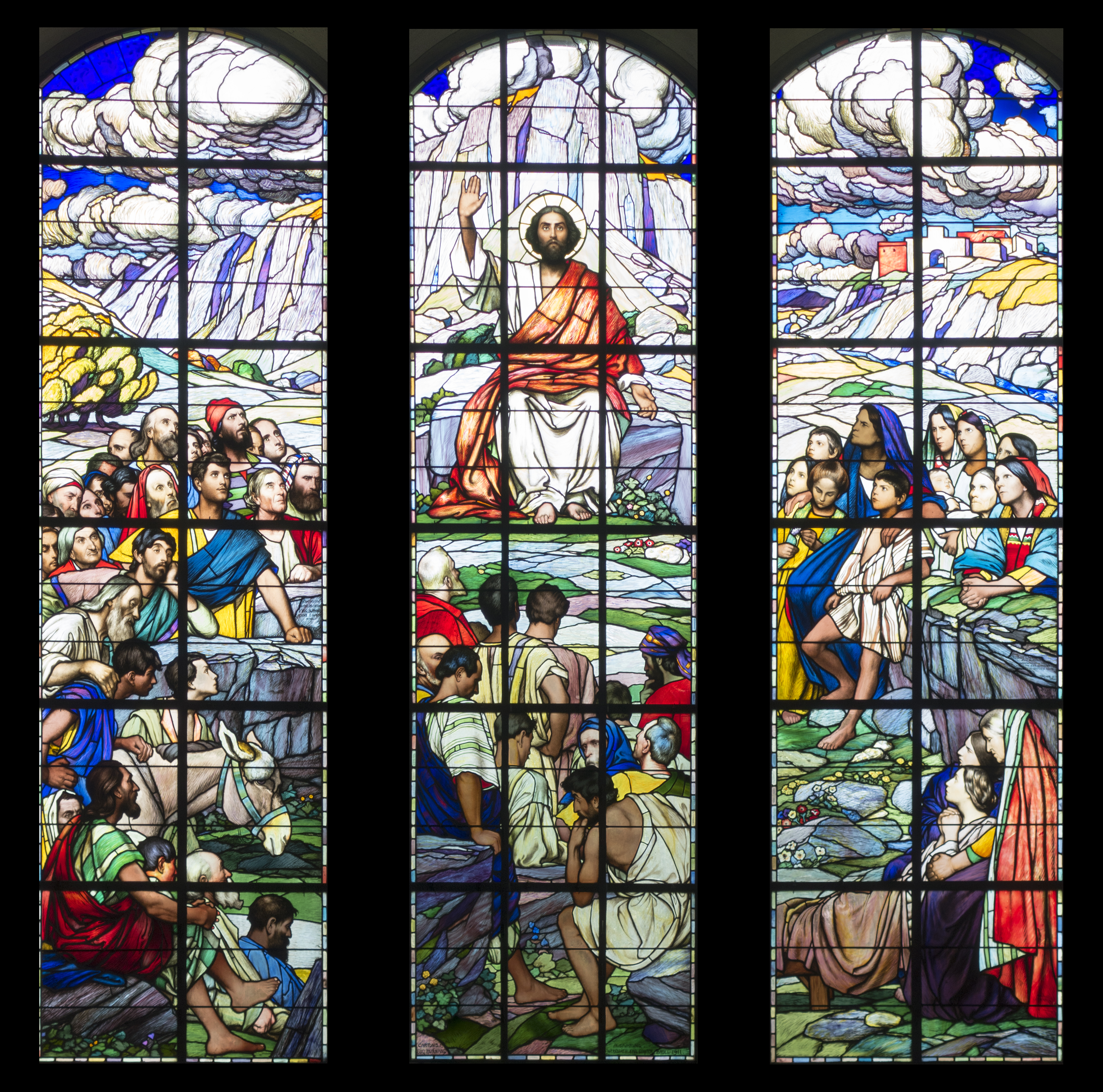
Sermon on the Mount windows at Herzebogensee Reformed church near Bern. Picture by Eugène Burnand 1910, Glass by Emil Gerster of Basel 1911

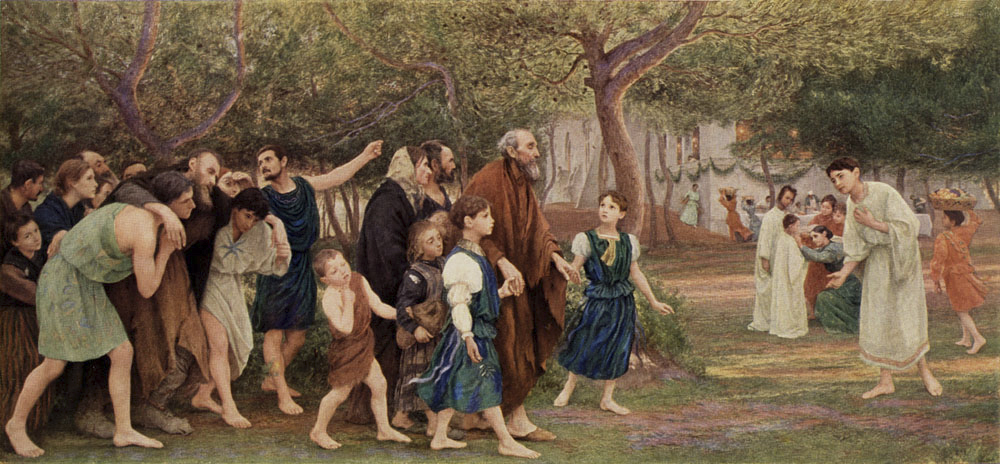
L'Invitation au festin (Invitation to the feast) 1899, OOC 470 x 220 cm

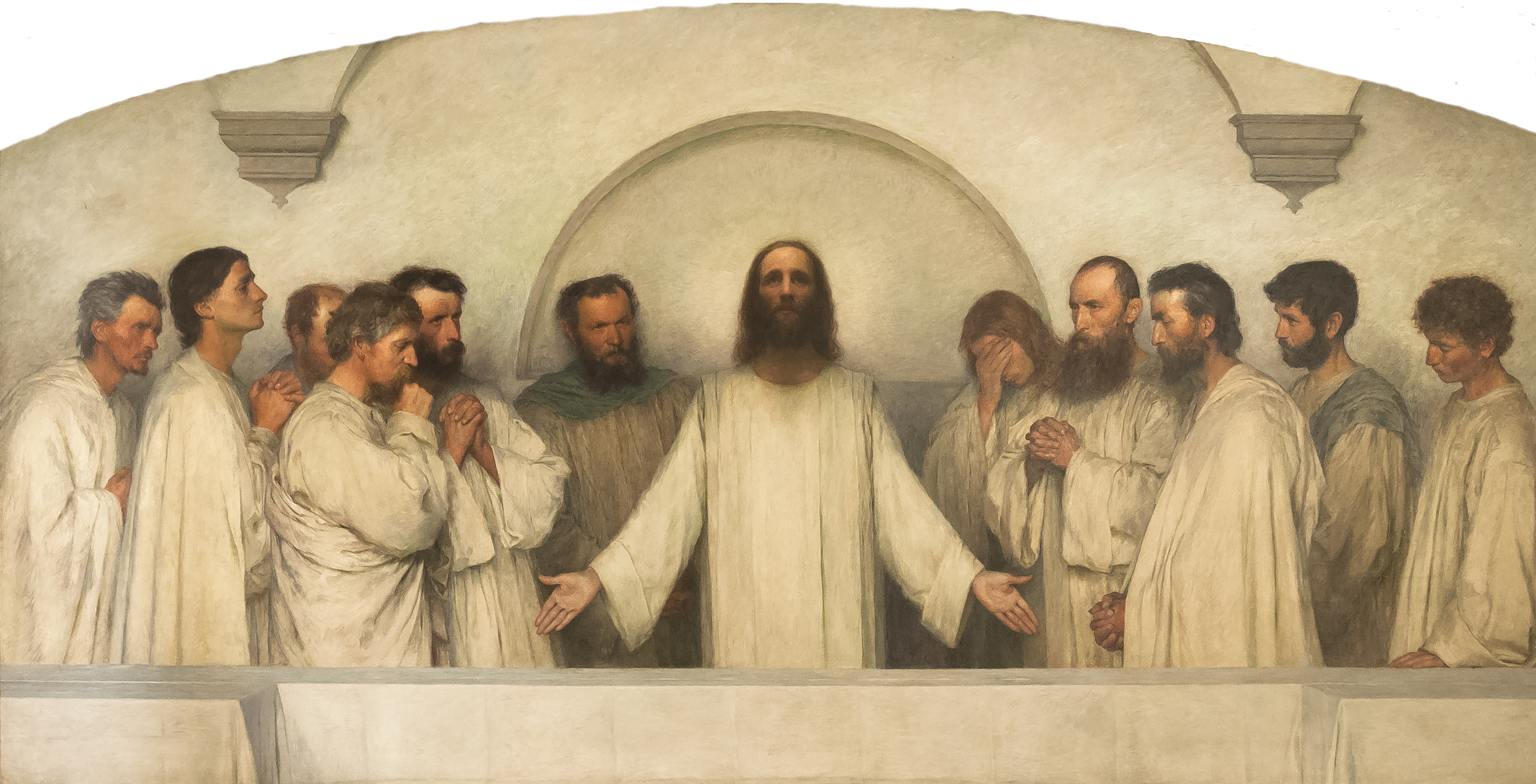
La Prière Sacerdotale (The high priestly Prayer) 1900–1, OOC 368 x 186 cm

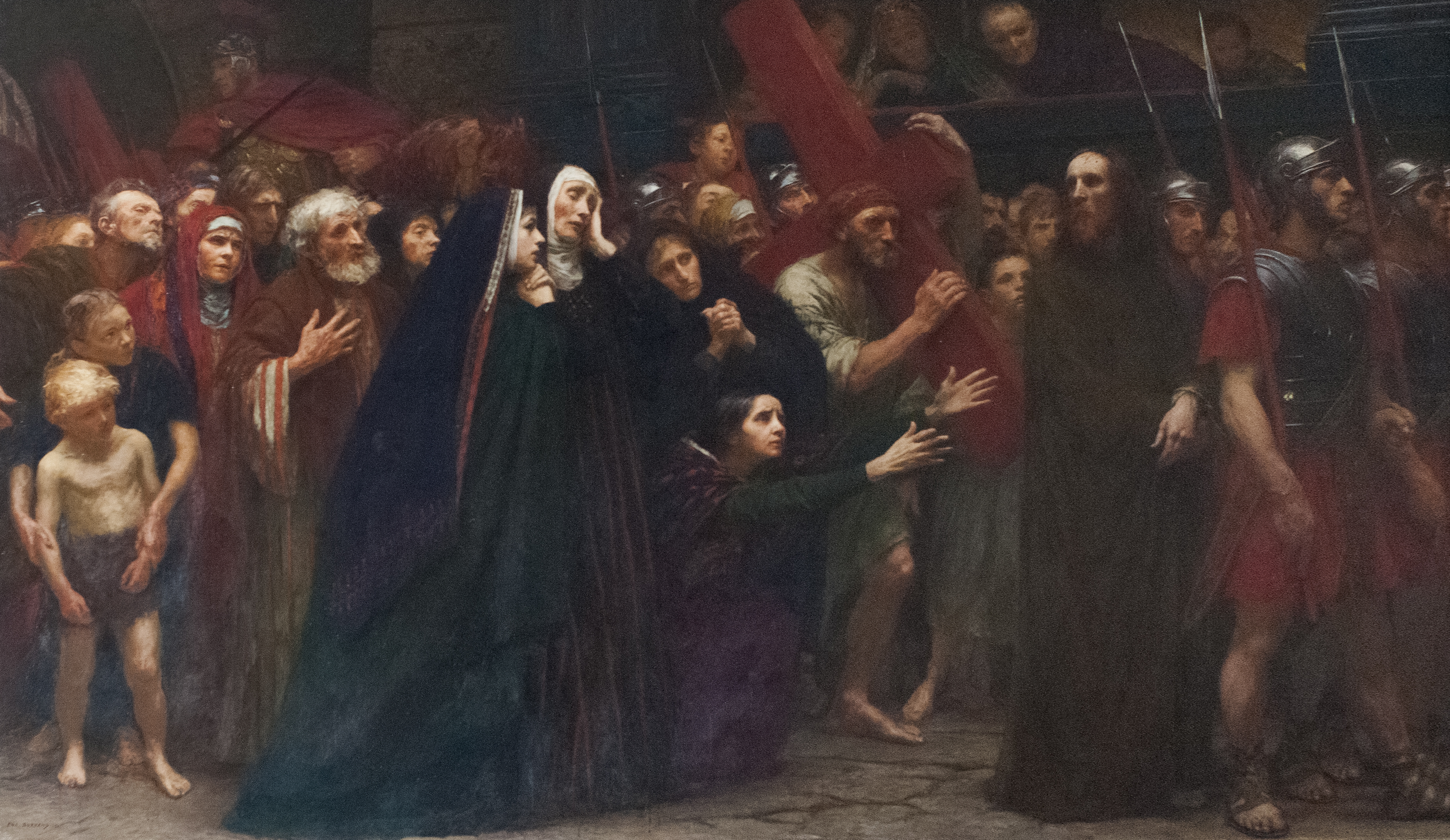
"La Voie Douloureuse (Via Dolorosa) 1904-5 OOC 352 x 212 cm

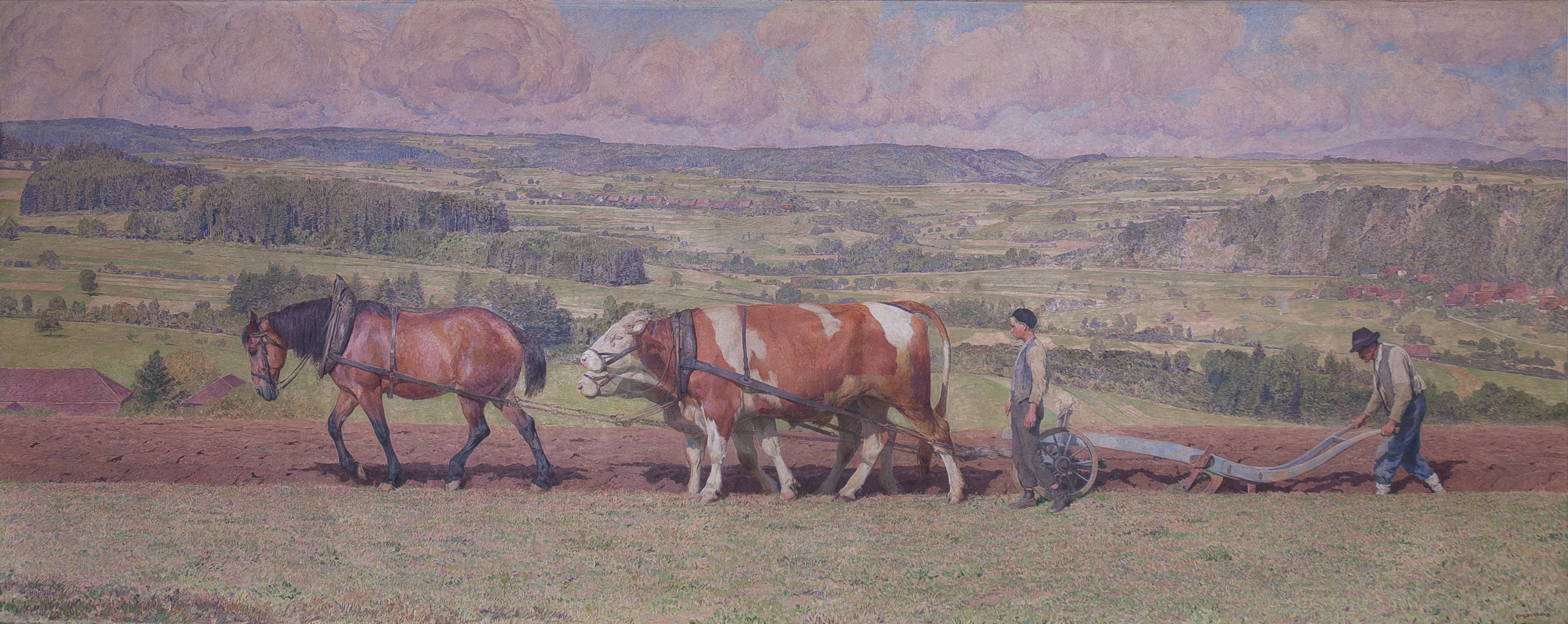
Labour dans le Jorat (Ploughing in the Jorat) 1916, OOC 620 x 270 cm

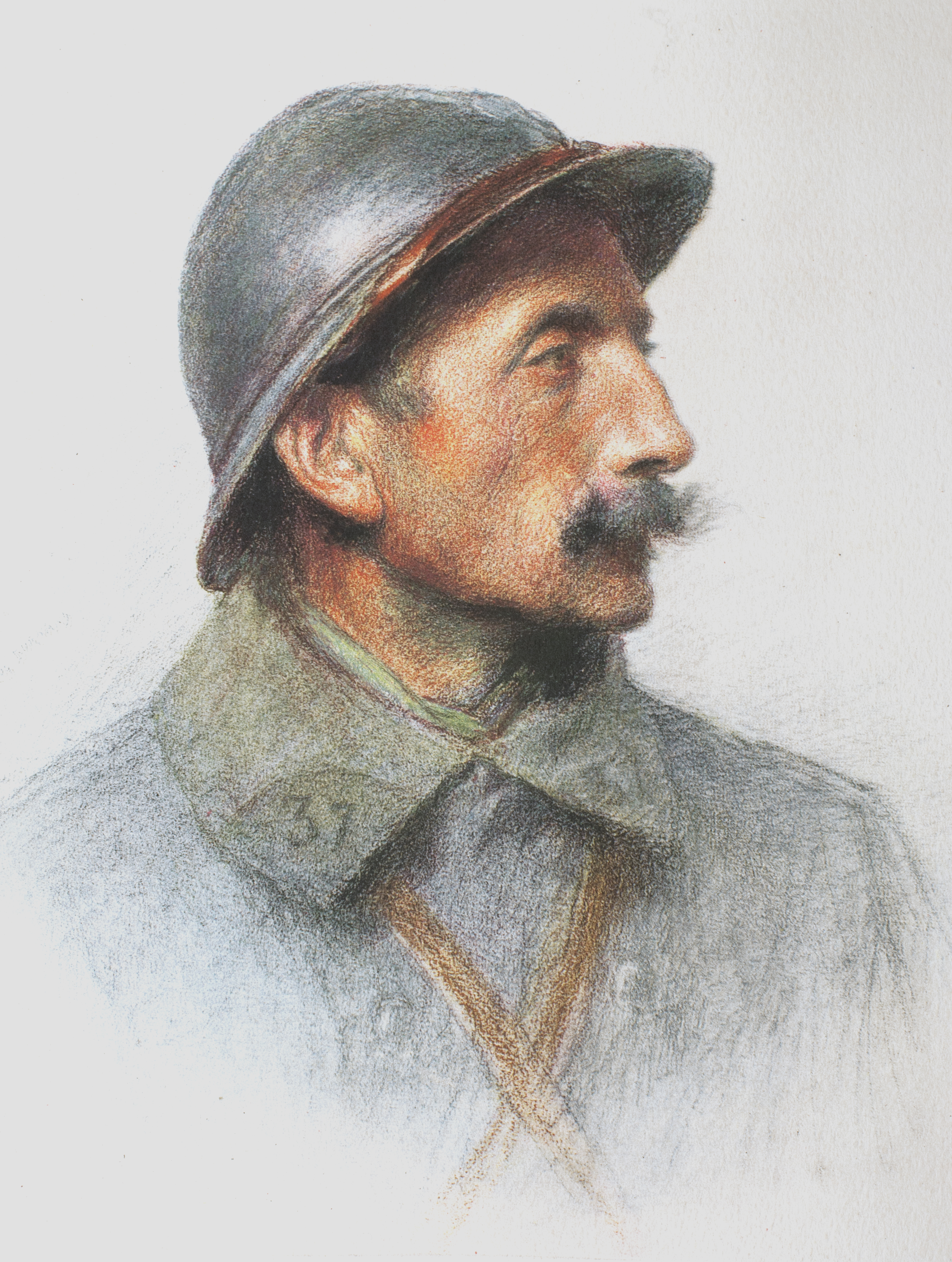
Photogravure of Fantassin Desvignes of Burgundy, from "Les Alliés dans la Guerre des Nations", Crété, Paris 1922

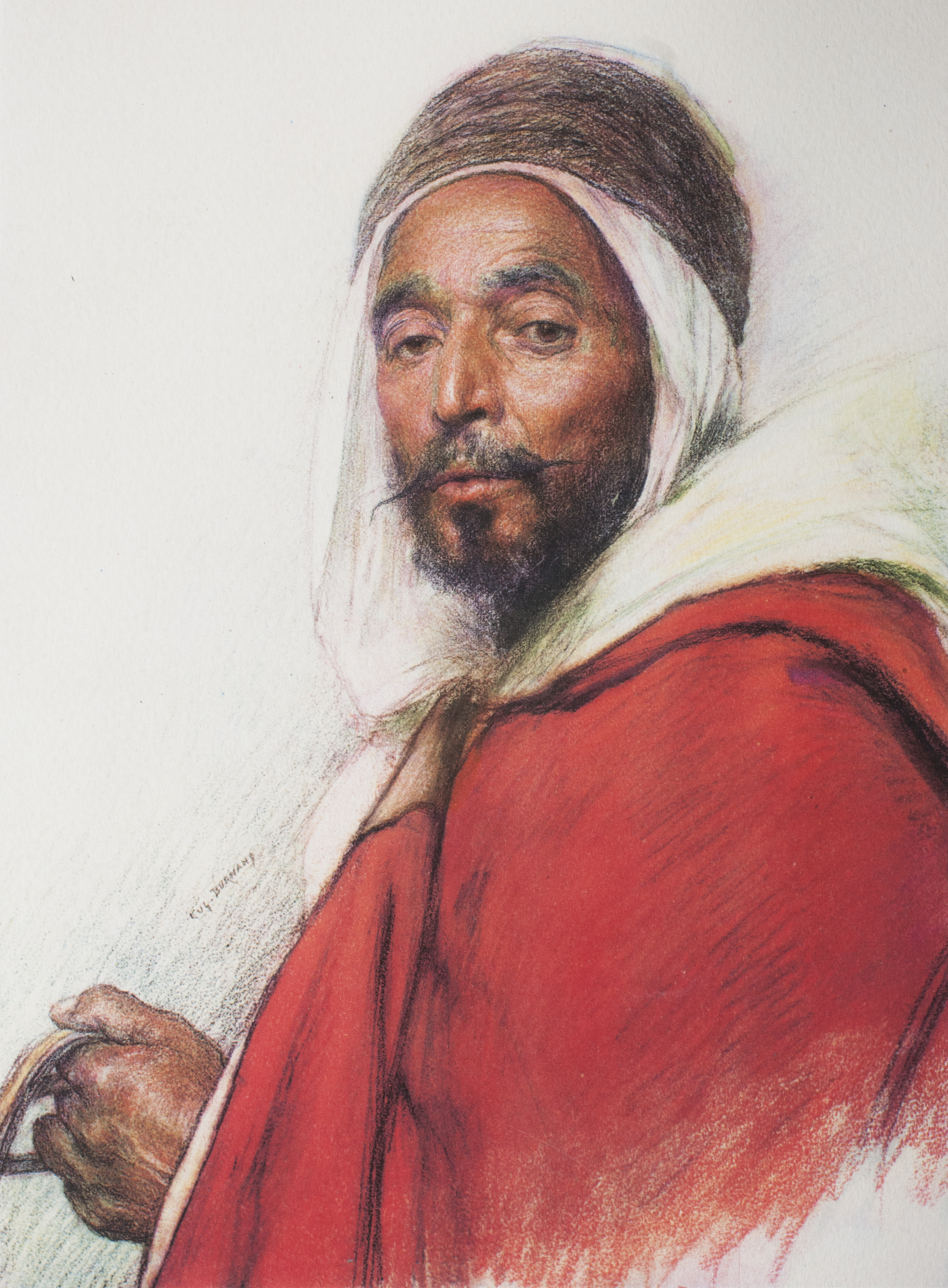
Photogravure of Mohamed Osman of Oran, Algeria, from "Les Alliés dans la Guerre des Nations", Crété, Paris 1922

Eugène Burnand's last enterprise was possibly his greatest and most ambitious, but is little known today. In 1917, with the experience of his limited series of "Types Vaudois" behind him, he set out to make a series of pencil and pastel portraits of "types" that were engaged with the military in the war that had started in 1914. Burnand was fascinated by the wide range of people from varied races from all over the world who had been drawn into the conflict on the side of the Allies. He was more interested in the lowly than the leaders and travelled about France to find his subjects in ports and barracks. He got to know them first, often to meet his family and give hospitality. That way he got to know their true feelings and attitudes, which he depicted with great skill. He had completed 40 by 1918 at the end of the war, but the military remained active for a long time afterwards, and he completed 104 in all. Eighty were exhibited at the Luxembourg Museum, Paris, in 1919 to great public acclaim, and 100 were exhibited a year later as a prelude to their publication as a book in 1922. Most (101) of the originals were purchased by American philanthropist William Nelson Cromwell for the French Nation and they are now held by the French Legion of Honour where 72 of the 101 are displayed at their museum in Paris. One hundred and two have recently been published again in a book to mark the Great War centenary and the battle of Verdun. (They can also be viewed online.)

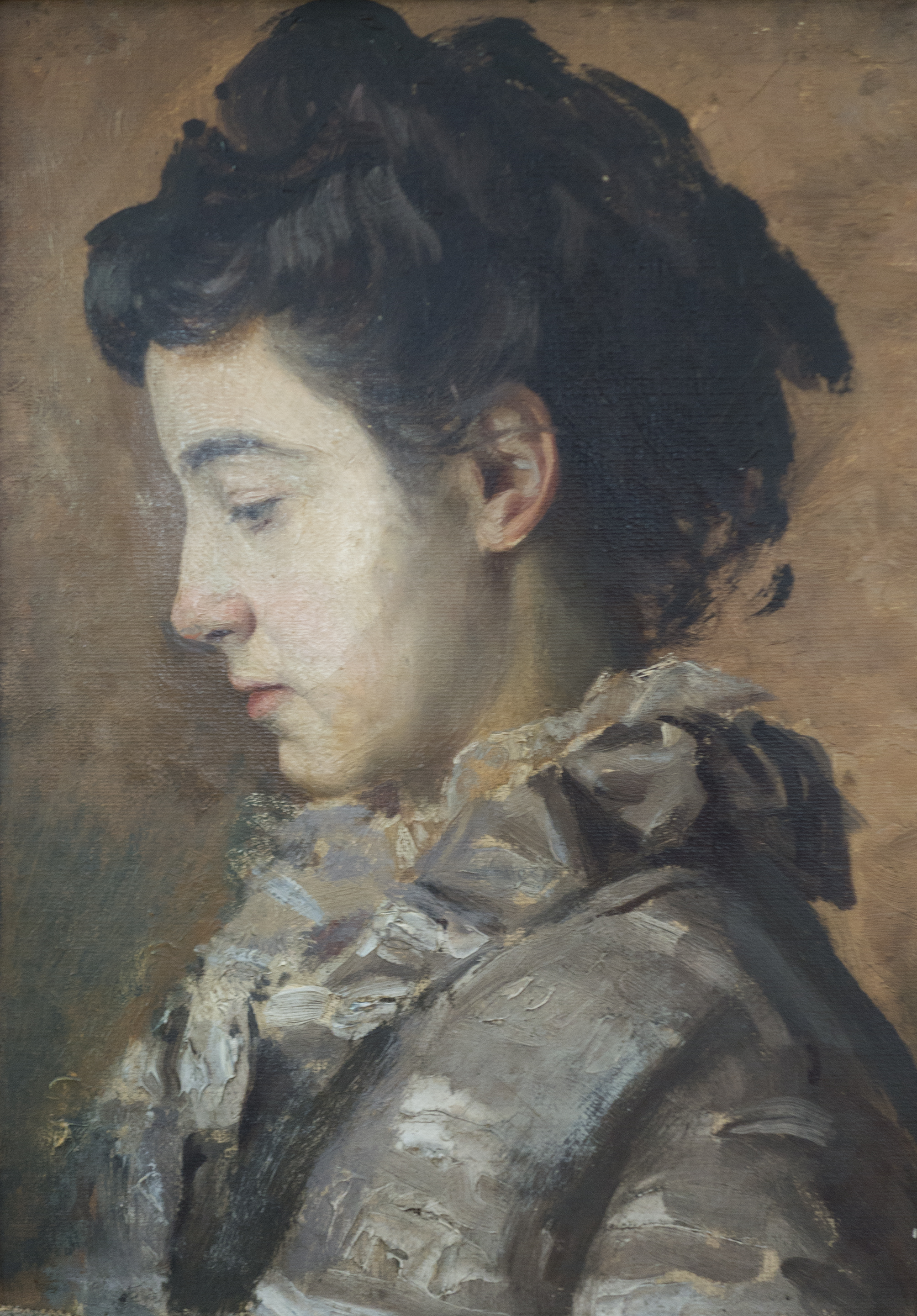
Julia Burnand by Eugène Burnand OOC 1889

By 1900, Burnand was among the notable artists in western Europe. He Later focused on religious themes, particularly 'The Parables', which gained public attention. His work has been described by some critics as highly detailed or photographic, which may have effected its academic reception. As a result, he became less widely known in Switzerland and France, and was not widely recognized in the English-speaking world. In recent years, his work has received renewed scholarly and public interest. His painting "Disciples running to the Sepulchre" has attracted renewed attention, and interest in First World War-related art has also contributed to a reassessment of his work, to which he made a significant contribution.[1][2][3][4]

Burnand died on 4 February 1921 in Paris, at the age of 70.

== Works ==
Ceramics

- 1869 - "Epagneul couché" ceramic, terracotta

Drawings, watercolours, lithographs, engravings

- 1875 - "Officier" drawing, watercolour, charcoal, paper
- 1878 - "Bûcheron en prière" (canvas painted on his honeymoon in Valais)
- N - D - "Le Loup de Gobbio" drawing, watercolour
- N - D - "Chevaux" charcoal, 13 cm X 21 cm, Album Sargent Singer folio 24 (Louvre Museum)
- 1880 c "Étude pour Mireille" drawing, watercolour, 22.5 cm X 34.5 cm
- 1880 - "Les Vanniers au travail" engraving
- 1880 - "Mireille" etchings for the book by F. Mistral
- 1882 - "Portrait de Alphonse Daudet", engraving (Museum of Compiègne)
- 1883 - "Paysanne du Valais"
- 1883 - "Paysage du Valais"
- 1884 - "Mireille" engraving
- 1885 - "François le Champi" drawings to illustrate this work of George Sand
- 1895 - "Alter Bauer" drawing, crayon, watercolour
- 1895 c "Le Salon Carré du Louvre" drawing, highlight white chalk, charcoal, 37.4 cm X 25.7 cm
- 1908 - "Buried Treasure" charcoal, black chalk, pastel (Museum de Institute of Arts, Minneapolis USA)
- 1908 - "Der Schweinehirt" drawing, watercolour, charcoal. 18 X 35 cm
- 1909 - "Tête de femme" in a medal on the left of the 1000 Swiss franc banknote issued in 1911. Foundry scene on the reverse by Eugène Burnand
- 1909 - "Tête de femme" in a medal for the 500 franc Swiss banknote and a scene with embroiderers on the reverse 1912 by Eugène Burnand
- 1911 - "À l'étable" drawing, watercolour, 11.5 X 15.5 cm
- 1911 - "Cartons pour vitraux"picture templates for the stained glass windows depicting the 'Sermon on the Mount" in the parish church at Herzogenbudsee near Bern
- 1912 - "Vache dans un pré" drawing, watercolour, charcoal, 42.8 X 55.8 cm
- 1915 - "Faces et profils de chez nous" series of drawings and pastels
- 1917-20 - "Types de soldats alliés ayant participé à la Guerre des nations" 104 coloured pencil and pastel drawings, 101 of which were bought by American philanthropist William Nelson Cromwell in 1924 for the French Government and placed for safe-keeping in the Museum of the Legion of Honour, Paris
- N - D - "Musiciens Juifs Tunisiens" drawing, watercolour, charcoal, 23.5 X 37 cm
- 1917 c "Un Soldat" engraving, lithograph, 18 X 15 cm
- 1917 - "Sous-Officier écossais", lithograph (man looking to the left, a pipe in the right hand, wearing a cap)
- N - D - "L'Alcool tue" poster, lithograph, 90 X 63 cm
- N - D - "L'Alcool Tue" engraving, poster, 158 X 118 cm
- N - D - "Homme debout vu de dos" Lead mine 31 X 14 cm

Illustrations

- 1876 - first illustration of an article in the revue L'Illustration
- 1879 - second illustration of an article in the revue L'Illustration
- 1879 - illustration in the journal Le Tour du Monde
- 1880 - Première illustration pour Mireille by Frédéric Mistral with the consent Louis Hachette
- 1882 - "Ferme Swiss" illustration; "Les légendes des Alpes Vaudoises" by Alfred Ceresole
- 1883 - Illustrations de six "37 Contes choisis" de Alphonse Daudet; Le Photographe- Les petits pâtés - Les Vieux - Les étoiles - Un décoré du 15 août - Kadour et Katel.
- 1884 - "Mireille" Paris Hachette; 25 etchings outside the text, engravings of Eugène Burnand and 55 drawing in the text re-edited in 1891
- 1888 - "François le Champi" de George Sand, Illustrations by E. Burnand Edt Calmann Lévy et Cie 1888
- 1890 - illustration of; "L'Orphelin" by Urbain Olivier
- 1896 - illustration of a report of the "Bohémiens aux Saintes-Maries de la Mer" by Marie-Anne de Bovet for the revue : L'Illustration 16 May
- 1908 - "Les Paraboles" Eugène Burnand, Berger-Levrault, Paris 1908, volume in 175 pages, 61 drawing, 11 plates, foreword by Eugène Melchior de Vogüé, Member of the Académie française.
- 1909 - "Le Samedi Saint"
- 1919 - "The Little Flowers of Saint Francis" Translation by Thomas Okey with 30 drawings by Eugène Burnand. JM Dent & Sons Ltd, London 1919
- 1920 - "Les petites fleurs" Saint Francis of Assisi, Berger-Levrault 271 pages with illustrations by Eugène Burnand.

Paintings

- 1872 - "Le Matin" OOC h 50 cm
- 1873 - "Ânes dans le Midi" OOC 60 x 104 cm
- 1874 - "Dans la Montagne" OOC 95 x 60 cm
- 1874 - "Lavandière à Seppey" 14.5 13 cm
- 1874 - "La cour de Seppey" OOC 55 x 46 cm
- 1875 - "L'Allée des cerisiers" OOC 45 x 35 cm
- 1875 - "Le Soir" OOC 65.5 x 92 cm (concours Calame à Genève mention honorable)
- 1875 - "Paris" OOC 32.5 x 41 cm
- 1875 - "Vue de la Villa Doria Pamphilij" HSP; 23 x 15 cm
- 1875 - "Junge im Jardin des Tuileries" OOC; H:32.5 cm X L:41 cm
- 1876 - "Intérieur d'église" OOC 139 x 108.5 cm
- 1876 - "L'Angélus" 60 x 95 cm
- 1876 - "L'Été" OOC 33 x 41 cm
- 1876 - "Le Printemps " " 25 x 30 cm
- 1876 - "La Veillée des fileuses " '" OOC 124 x 178 cm
- 1877 - "La Promenade du soir au convent" OOC 75 x 55 cm
- 1877 - "En Camargue" OOC 74.5 x 110 cm
- 1877 - "Solitude" OOC 33.5 x 23 cm
- 1877 - "La Fournée dans un village des montagnes" OOC 140 x 210 cm
- 1878 - "Gardien de taureaux en Camargue" OOC 47 x 58 cm
- 1878 - "Troupeau en Camargue" OOC 28 X 35 cm
- 1878 - "Au Couvent "OOC 47 x 58 cm
- 1878 - " " Les Foins dans le Jorat " " OOC 47 x 80.5 cm
- 1878 - " " Le Matin " " OOC 65 x 81 cm
- 1878 - " " Le Vallon " " OOC 55 x 46 cm
- 1878 - " " Fileuse Valaisanne " " OOC 68.5 x 51 cm
- 1878-9 - " " Bûcheron en prière " " OOC 140 x 100 cm (cut down by artist to 45 x 53.5 cm 1895)
- 1878 - " " Camargue " " OOC 30 x 40 cm
- 1878 - " " Troupeau de boefs au bord de la mer. Camargue " " OOC 40 x 80 cm
- 1879 - "La Pompe à feu" OOC 200 x 310 cm
- 1880 - "Les Glaneuses" OOC 200 cm x 150 cm
- 1880 - " " La Dent du Midi " " OOC 40 x 30 cm
- 1881 - " " Le Braconnier " " OOC 31 x 23 cm
- 1881 - "Bäuerin beim Füttern der Schweine" OOC 29 x 28 cm
- 1882 - "La Ferme Suisse "OOC 201.5 x 286 cm
- 1883 - "Pâturage d'Anzeindaz" OOC 50 x 73 cm
- 1884 - "Taureau dans les Alpes" OOC, 201 x 271 cm
- 1886 - "Le Faucheur" OOC;S; Dim: H:149.5 cm X L:120 cm (Museum Eugène Burnand, Moudon)
- 1887 - "L'Abreuvoir" OOC; (San Francisco Museum, USA)
- 1890 - "La Descente des Troupeaux (Provence)"OOC 124 x 200 cm. Bâle, Öffentliche Kunstsammlung
- 1890 - "Dans les Hauts pâturages" OOC; For the Nestlé Company
- 1892 - "Panorama des Alpes Suisses" Dim; H: 17 meters x 11.5 meters, with Auguste Baud-Bovy Toured but accidentally destroyed
- 1893 - "Un Mousse" OOC; (San Francisco Museum, USA)
- 1893 - "Méditation" OOC; (San Francisco Museum, USA)
- 1893 - "Le Lac Léman (Premier Printemps)" OOC 111 x 201 cm (Glion, Hôtel Victoria Collection)
- 1894 - "La fuite de Charles le Téméraire" OOC. H:318 cm X L:538.5 cm (Eugène Burnand Museum, Moudon)
- 1894 - "Le Paysan" OOC 230 x 308 cm (Museum cantonal des beaux-arts de Lausanne)
- 1894 - "L'Appel" OOC; (San Francisco Museum, USA)
- 1895 - 1899 "Les Alpes Bernoise" OOC; 200 x 180 cm
- 1895 - 1918 "La Prière Sacerdotale" OOC
- 1895-6 " La Rentreé des troupeaux " OOC 100 x 186 cm (Vevey, museé Jenisch)
- 1896 - "Paysage Alpin" OOC; 32 x 43 cm
- 1896 - "Le Novice" OOC; Sbnd; H:57 cm X L:94 cm; (Galerie Vincent Lécuyer)
- 1898 - "Les disciples Pierre et Jean courant au sépulcre le matin de la Résurrection" OOC Sbd; Dim; H:82 cm X L:134 cm (Museum d'Orsay, Paris)
- 1898 - "Homme de douleur" OOC;138 x 103 cm (Collection des Musées d'art et d'histoire de la Ville de Genève)
- 1898-9 -"Repos sous les pins"OOC; 85 x 127 cm (Art Gallery of South Australia)
- 1899 - "Maternité" OOC; (San Francisco Museum, USA)
- 1899 - "Invitation au festin" OOC; Winterthur Museum
- N - D - "La Première Communion" OOC; H:65.4 cm X L: (Metropolitan Museum of Art, USA)
- 1900 - "Le Mont-Blanc vu de Clergère" OOC marouflage; H:372 cm X L:260 cm on the ceiling of Grande Salle restaurant in the Gare de Lyon Paris; "Le Train bleu"
- 1901 - "La Ferme" OOC 52.5 x 316 cm
- 1902 - "Le Retour du fils Prodigue" OOC, 47 x 33 cm
- 1904 - "La Voie Douloureuse" OOC, 219 x 353.5 cm
- 1905 - "Portrait einer jungen Frau im weissen Kleid" OOC, 106 x 82 cm
- 1906 - "Portrait de ma mère" OOC;
- 1907 - "Septembre" or "L'Automne" 62 x 98 cm OOC
- 1907 - "Le Samedi-Saint" OOC; H:164.5 cm X L:281 cm (Fine Art Museum, La Chaux-de-Fonds)
- 1910 - "Le retour du fils prodigue" 100 x 150 cm OOC
- 1913 - "Maternité" OOC, 114 x 87 cm
- 1913 - "Les Alpes fribourgeoise (après-midi d'automne)" OOC
- 1913 - "Tristesse" 80 x 60 cm OOC
- 1915 - "Le Labour dans le Jorat" canvas completed 1915, OOC 253 x 632 cm destroyed by fire 1916 and repainted by the artist the same year,
- 1917 - "La Vallée" 94 x 195 cm OOC destroyed in workshop fire 1920
- 1917 - "Soir de septembre" 80 x 150 cm OOC destroyed by workshop fire 1920
- 1920 - "La Vallée" 80 x 150 cm pastel. Replica of 1917 OOC destroyed
- 1920 - "Le Matin de Pâques" fire damaged 1920 and restored by David Burnand 211 x 292 cm OOC Zoug, Protestant church
- N - D - "La Gardeuse de moutons" OOC; H:46 cm X L:27 cm Grenoble Museum
- N - D - "Le village de la Celle-sous-Moret" HSPanneau de bois, (Metropolitan Museum of Art)
- N - D - "Saint-François d'Assise et ses moutons" OOC;
- N - D - "Lessiveuse" OOC; H: X L: (Fine Art Museum San Francisco)
- N - D - "Waldrand mit Ziegen" OOC; H:120 cm X L:85 cm
- N - D - "Rounding up the herd" OOC; H:116.8 cm X L:181.6 cm

Series of previous studies exhibited at La Granette, Lausanne 1912

- "Goats in the Oberland" 26 x 42 cm OOC
- "Studies of Garrigues" 23 x 35 cm OOC
- "Study of Camargue (1)" 23 x 33 cm OOC
- "Study of Camargue (2)" 23 x 33 cm OOC
- "Pâturage d'Anzeindaz (étude)" 33 x 49 cm OOC
- "La Vallée" 23 x 28 cm OOC
- "Studies of cattle in the sun" 25.5 x 42 cm OOC
- "Study of shepherd (Languedoc)" 28 x 36 cm OOC
- "Road to Garrigues, near Montpellier" 31.5 x 45.5 cm OOC
- "Le Patache (study)" 40 x 32 cm OOC
- "Nativity" 49 x 35 cm OOC
- "Etude de vache peinte en 1894" OOC
- "La Cuisine" 30 x 23 cm OOC Moudon
- "Navire charbonnier (port du Havre)" 27 x 35 cm OOC
- "Le Peintre de marine" 27 x 35 cm OOC
- "Entre le Mönch et l'Eiger (étude)" 40 x 29 cm OOC
- "Vue de la Camargue (étude)" 20 x 30 cm OOC
- "Etude faite à l'époque du Panorama des Alpes" 26 x 40 cm OOC

Papers, publications

- 1876 - "Quelques drawings de Millet" d'Eugène Burnand, Bibl Universitaire et revue suisse Tome:LVI PP.496–502
- 1883 - "Légendes vaudoises" de Alfred Cérésole (1842–1891) Illustration d'Eugène Burnand in4° 51 drawing de l'artiste don't 6 bois en pleine page (don't 4 sur planches non comprises dans la pagination par Théodore Girardet, qui a gravé l'ensemble sur bois)
- 1887 - "En Camargue" Les Lettres et les Arts revue illustrée n° 1887 pp. 226–232
- 1898 - "Quelques réflexions sur la beauté" Extrait de l'Annuaire des Universités chrétiennes de la Suisse romande Lausanne Imp Viret-Genton 1898
- 1898 - "Lettre sur le Pont Eloi" Gazette de Lausanne 27/12/1897 et 10/02/1898
- 1903 - préface du livre de Fatio Guillaume: "Ouvrons les yeux, voyage esthétique à travers la Switzerland" Édt Atar 1903 illustration de J.J. Redmond, A Pellegrini, C. Robina
- 1903 -1904 - "Notes sur l'Art religieux italien" Lausanne Association Chrétienne suisse d'étudiant P.1-30 ISBN 2-88295-469-7
- 1904 - "L'Art religieux italien" Conférence prononcée par Eugène Burnand à Montpellier, Lausanne et Paris en 1902 et 1903
- 1914 - "Le Sermon sur la Montagne" Illustration of E. Burnand for Sermon on the Mount from the pictures for the church at Herzogenbuchsee (Switzerland) stained glass windows. Berger-Levrault 1914, XLVIII, 57p
- 1922 - "Les Alliés dans la Guerre des Nations" 100 portraits of military types in pencil and pastel, photogravure reproductions, 10 monochrome, 90 colour in the De Luxe version. Commentaries by Robert Bernand. Preface by Marchal Foch. Crété, Paris.
- 2010 - "Portraits de la Grande Guerre. Les pastels d'Eugène Burnand au musée de la Légion d'honneur" Presented by Xavier Boniface. ISBN 978-2-11-0993489. Joint publication by the Meuse General Council and Legion of Honour to mark WWI centenary and the Battle of Verdun

== Awards ==
Prizes and medals

- 1875 - Honourable mention at the Concours Calame, Genève
- 1882 - 3rd class medal for the etchings for Mireille
- 1883 - 3rd class medals for the illustrations of Contes choisis by Alphonse Daudet
- 1889 - 1st class gold medal
- 1900 - 1st class gold medal for his collected works

Decorations, titles and distinctions

- 1889 - President of the Swiss Fine Arts Commission at the 1889 International Exhibition of Fine Arts, Paris
- 1893 - Legion of Honour Chevalier of the Legion of Honour
- 1912 - Correspondent member of the Institut de France
- 1919 - Legion of Honour Officer of the Legion of Honour

== Salons, exhibitions, galleries ==
Salons

- 1875 - First hanging at the Salon of painting and sculpture, Paris
- 1879 - Salon ("Bûcheron en prière")
- 1882 - Salon des artistes français, (Mireille etchings illustrating the poem of F. Mistral) 3rd class medal
- 1885 - Salon - (Le Taureau dans les Alpes large canvas and great success)
- 1890 - La Nationale (sociétaire)
- 1898 - Salon - (Les disciples, Pierre et Jean courant au sépulcre, le matin de la Résurrection )
- 1906 - Salon of the National Society of Fine Arts: ("Portrait de ma mère")
- 1911 - Salon (cartoons for stained glass. Sermon on the Mount)

Exhibitions, galleries

- 1874 - First participation in the national Swiss Fine Arts Society exhibition
- 1875 - First hanging in the Salon Paris
- 1883 - Exhibition at Zurich
- 1886 - Exhibition in New-York
- 1889 - Paris Universal Exhibition
- 1890 - Exhibition Genève, Lausanne, Neuchâtel, Montpellier, Toulouse
- 1896 - Geneva
- 1897 - Dowdeswell Gallery, London
- 1897 - Royal Academy London
- 1897 - Autumn exhibition of Walker Art Gallery Liverpool
- 1897 - Carnegie Art Galleries, Pittsburg
- 1900 - Universal Exhibition, Paris. Painters of mountains
- 1901 - London
- 1903 - Swiss Nationals exhibition, Fine Arts Museum, Lausanne
- 1911 - Exhibition of stained glass cartoons at the International Exhibition of Art Chrétien organised by the Société de Saint-Jean
- 1913 - Kinsthalle, Basel
- 1914 - Berne
- 1916 - La Grenette, Lausanne (Le Labour dans le Jorat) Destroyed by fire in this location
- 1985 - La peinture religieuse suisse au XIX^{e} siècle Lucerne Kunstmuseum
- 2005 - Lausanne; Exhibition dedicated to the painter Eugène Burnand.

== Museums ==
- Cantonal Museum of Fine Art, Lausanne, Switzerland
- Eugène Burnand Museum, Moudon, Vaud, Switzerland
- San Francisco Fine Art Museum USA (Au couvent - Lessiveuse)
- Institute of Arts Minneapolis USA (Buried Treasure)
- Metropolitan Museum of Art USA (Le village de la Celle-sous-Moret)
- Luxembourg Museum, Paris
- Legion of Honour Museum, Paris (101 pastels of military 'types' on the Allied side). Donated 1924, 72 are on display
- Musée d'Orsay Paris ("Les Disciples running to the tomb on the morning of the resurrection")
- Musée du Louvre Graphic art department (Les Chevaux)
- Berne Museum, Switzerland
- Basel Museum, Switzerland
- Vevey Museum, Switzerland
- Geneva Museum, Switzerland
- National Museum of Fine Arts in Santiago, Chile
- Adelaide Museum, Australia
- Philadelphia Museum, USA
- Fine Art Museum of La Chaux-de-Fonds (Le Samedi-Saint) Acquired by the museum as a consequence of a public subscription
- Grenoble Museum, France (La Gardeuse de moutons)
- Museum of Compiègne, Oise, France, ( Portrait d'Alphonse Daudet)
- Museo Provincial de Bellas Artes Rosa Galisteo de Rodríguez, Santa Fe, Argentina.

== Bibliography ==
- Eugène Burnand : "Liber Veritatis" Journal of the artist. Archived in the University of Lausanne
- De Flandrezy, Bouzanquet: "Le Taureau Camargue" Edt du Cadran 1925
- Michel de Rivaz: "Le billet de banque Suisse, 1907-1997" Collection: la Mémoire de l'œil ISBN 2-88100-080-0
- René Burnand: "Eugène Burnand, l'homme, l'artiste et son œuvre" 1926 biography by his son René; Berger et Levrault 1926
- René Burnand: "Eugène Burnand au pays de Mireille" SPES, 1941
- Junod Louis: "Moudon" Edt du Griffon, Neuchâtel 1956
- Philippe Kaenel: "Eugène Burnand (1850-1921) Peintre naturaliste" Edt 5 Continents, 255p. 2004 ISBN 88-7439-104-8
- Philippe Kaenel: "Eugène Burnand la peinture d'après nature" Cabédita Coll: Archives vivantes 297p 2006 ISBN 2-88295-469-7
- Collectif: "Le Train Bleu Edt; Édition Presse Lois Unis Service Paris 1990, Imp par U.F.I France, ISBN 2-908557-01-0
- Etienne Burnand: "Une vie, un peintre" 1994
- Fontanaaz Monique: "La ville de Moudon et ses musées" 2002
- Marc Grelet: "Eugène Burnand, sa vie, son œuvre" Edt SPES paru(sd)
- Henri Niggeler: "Eugène Burnand illustrateur" Bibliothèque cantonale et universitaire, Palais de Rumine, Lausanne, 1991
- Henri Niggeler: "L'illustration de Mireille par Eugène Burnand", in Arlésienne: le mythe? Museon Arlaten, Arles, 1999
- Henri Niggeler, Philippe Kaenel: "Eugène Burnand. Une vie en faces." Bibliothèque cantonale & universitaire, Lausanne, 2001
- Shirley Darlington: "Eugene Burnand. In Search of the Swiss Artist (1850-1921)" Uniform 2016, ISBN 978-1-910500-50-7
