= Paul Armand Girardet =

French painter (1859–1915)

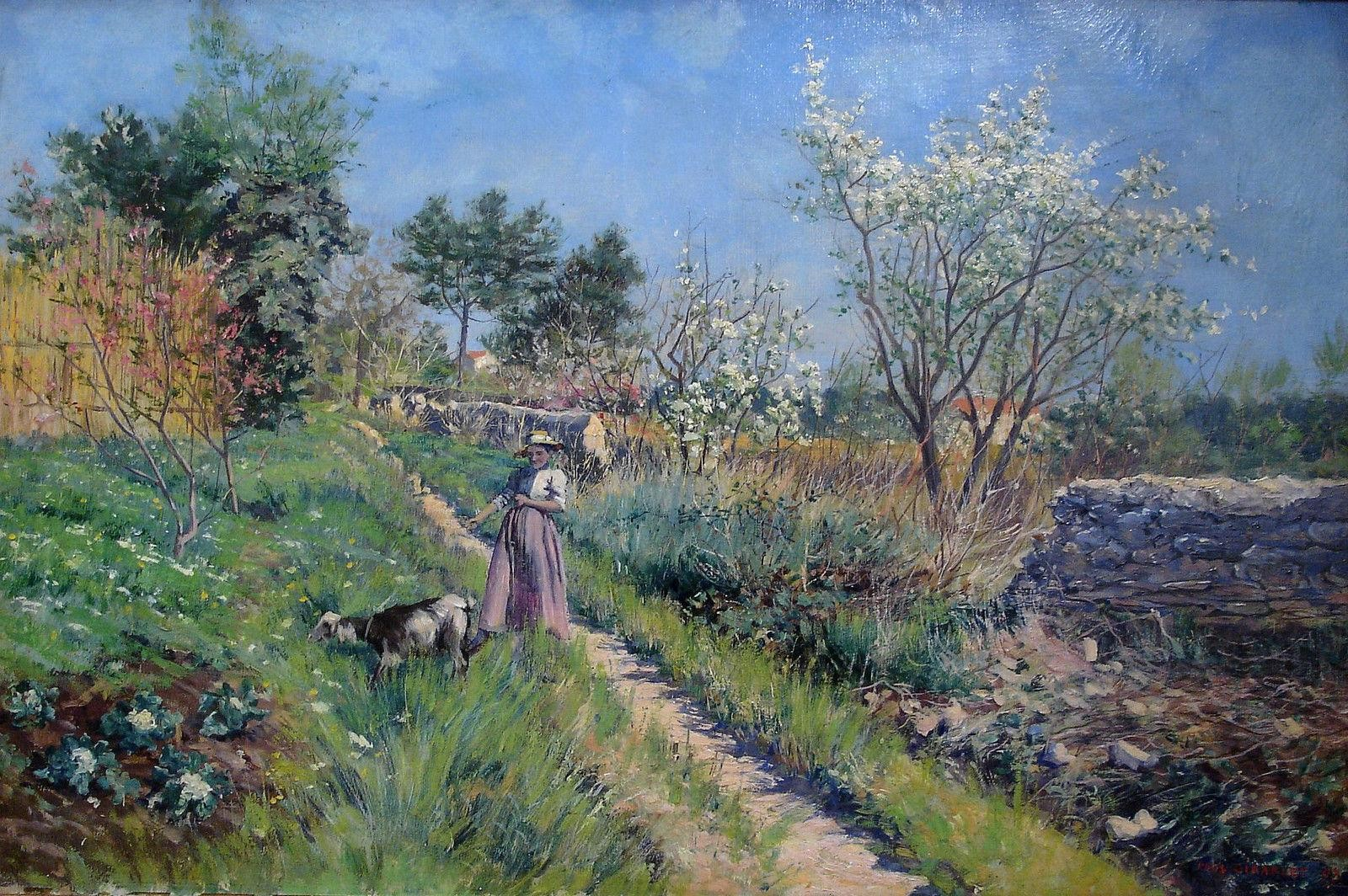
A Young Woman with Her Dog

Paul Armand Girardet (French pronunciation: [pɔl aʁmɑ̃ ʒiʁaʁdɛ]; 22 May 1859, Versailles - 1915) was a French painter and woodcut artist of Swiss ancestry.

== Life and work ==
He came from a Swiss Huguenot family. His father, Paul Girardet, was a copper engraver. His brothers, Jules, Eugène, Léon and Théodore, as well as his sister, Julia Antonine (1851-1921), also became painters or engravers.

His first drawing lessons came from his father. He then studied with the illustrator and woodcut artist, Auguste Trichon. He then learned oil painting at the École Nationale Supérieure des Beaux-Arts in Paris, with Alexandre Cabanel. He lived in Neuilly-sur-Seine and, in 1893, married the sculptor Berthe Imer.

After 1898, exhibited at the salon of the Société des Artistes Français. He specialized in color woodcuts; mainly producing views of landscapes and castles, such as the Palace of Versailles. His paintings were primarily genre scenes and landscapes.

== Sources ==
- Marie Tripet: "Girardet, Paul Armand". In: Carl Brun (Ed.): Schweizerisches Künstler-Lexikon. Vol.1: A–G. Huber & Co., Frauenfeld 1905, pg.586 (Online)
- "Girardet, Paul(-Armand)". In: Ulrich Thieme, Fred. C. Willis (Eds.): Allgemeines Lexikon der Bildenden Künstler von der Antike bis zur Gegenwart, Vol.14: Giddens–Gress. E. A. Seemann, Leipzig 1921, pg.167 (Online)
- René Burnand: L’étonnante histoire des Girardet. Artistes suisses. La Baconnière, Neuchâtel 1940.
- René Burnand: Les Girardet au Locle et dans le monde. La Baconnière, Neuchâtel 1957.
- (in German) Renate Treydel: Girardet, Paul-Armand. In: Allgemeines Künstlerlexikon. Die Bildenden Künstler aller Zeiten und Völker (AKL). Band 55, Saur, München u. a. 2007, ISBN 978-3-598-22795-0, S. 192
