= Théodore Girardet =

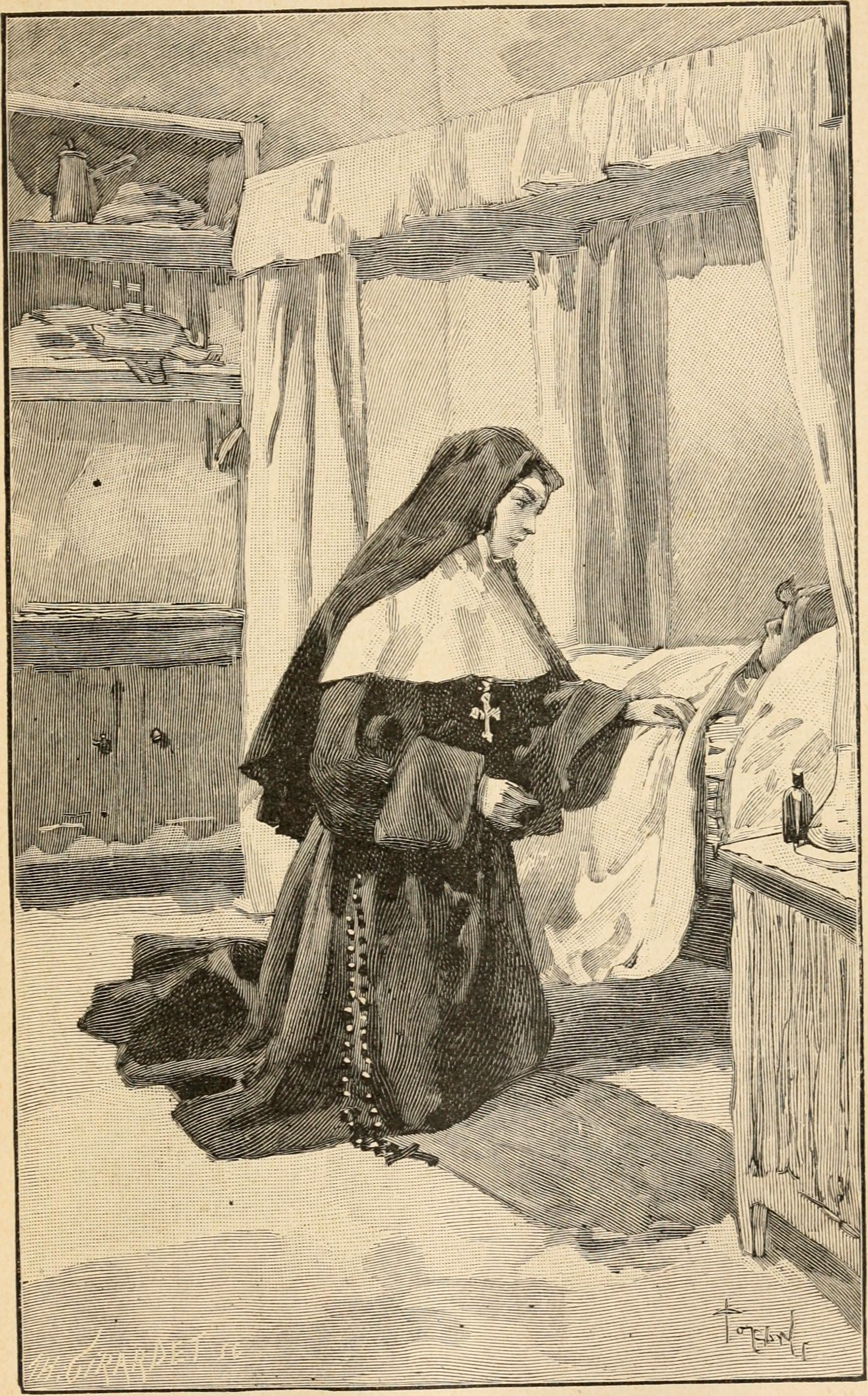
Illustration from Les Epreuves De Charlotte, by Charlotte Chabrier (1865-1935)

Théodore-Octave Girardet (22 September 1861, Versailles - 29 January 1935, Sainte-Maxime) was a French illustrator and wood-engraver.

== Life and work ==
He came from a Swiss Huguenot family. His father, Paul Girardet, was a copper engraver. His brothers, Jules, Eugène, Paul Armand and Léon, as well as his sister, Julia Antonine (1851-1921), also became painters or engravers.

He studied painting at the École Nationale Supérieure des Beaux-Arts in Paris with Alexandre Cabanel. He eventually decided to specialize in wood-engraving and worked in the studios of Eugène Froment. He also took some lessons from Auguste Trichon.

He remained in Paris, where he specialized in wood-engravings which were used as illustrations for newspapers and magazines, such as Le Monde illustré, L'Illustration and Le Tour du Monde; often based on designs by his brother-in-law, Eugène Burnand, or other family members. He was also active in the advertising industry, which was very lucrative, and exhibited at his work the Paris Salon.

== Sources ==
- M.Tripet: "Girardet, Théodore-Octave". In: Carl Brun (Ed.): Schweizerisches Künstler-Lexikon, Vol.1: A–G. Huber & Co., Frauenfeld 1905, pg.586
- "Girardet, Théodore". In: Ulrich Thieme, Fred. C. Willis (Ed.): Allgemeines Lexikon der Bildenden Künstler von der Antike bis zur Gegenwart, Vol.14: Giddens–Gress. E. A. Seemann, Leipzig 1921, pg.168 (Online)
- René Burnand: L’étonnante histoire des Girardet. Artistes suisses. La Baconnière, Neuchâtel 1940.
- René Burnand: Les Girardet au Locle et dans le monde. La Baconnière, Neuchâtel 1957.
- (in German) Renate Treydel: Girardet, Théodore. In: Allgemeines Künstlerlexikon. Die Bildenden Künstler aller Zeiten und Völker (AKL). Band 55, Saur, München u. a. 2007, ISBN 978-3-598-22795-0, S. 192
