= Paul Girardet =

Copper engraver

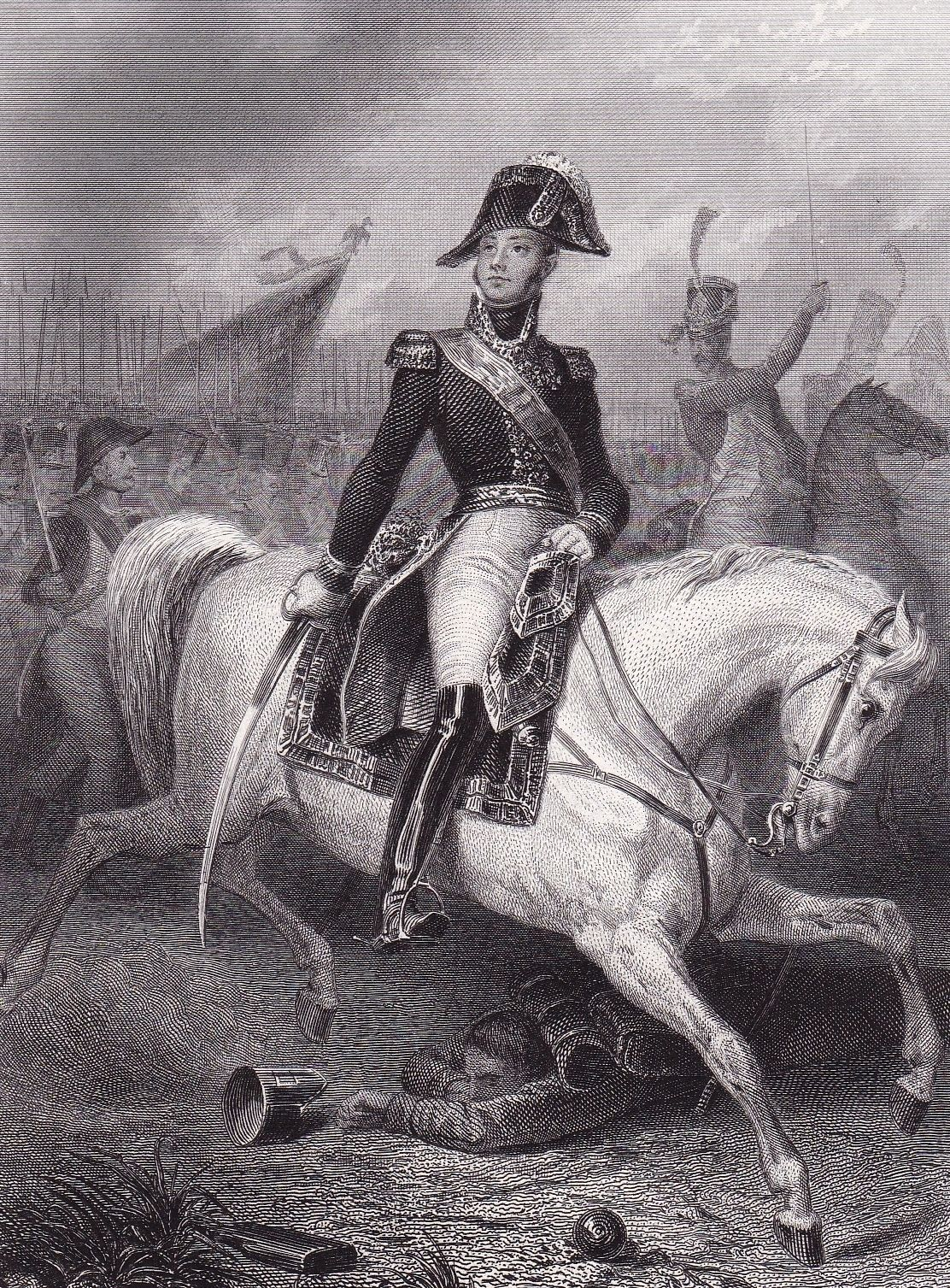
Marshall Étienne MacDonald; after Eugène Charpentier

Paul Girardet (French pronunciation: [pɔl ʒiʁaʁdɛ]; 8 March 1821, Neuchâtel - 28 February 1893, Paris) was a Swiss-born French copper engraver.

== Life and work ==
He came from a Swiss Huguenot family, and his father was the engraver, Charles Samuel Girardet. His brothers, Edouard and Karl, also became artists. Like them, he received his first art lessons from his father, but was interested only in copper engraving, which he worked hard to perfect. He also took courses in drawing at the École Nationale Supérieure des Beaux-Arts in Paris.

His works first appeared in Le Magasin Universel in 1839. Three years later, he took part in his first exhibition, with four mezzotints. After this success, his reputation was firmly established. His subject matter ranged from simple genre scenes, to complex depictions of battles.

His works include engraved versions of the paintings of numerous well-known artists, such as Horace Vernet, Paul Delaroche and Joseph Nicolas Robert-Fleury.

He was married to Louise Alexandrine, née Sandoz. His sons Léon, Jules, Eugène, Paul Armand and Théodore all became printmakers or painters, as did his daughter, Julia Antonine (1851-1921).

== Sources ==
- M.Tripet: "Girardet, Paul". In: Carl Brun (Ed.): Schweizerisches Künstler-Lexikon. Vol.1: A–G. Huber & Co., Frauenfeld 1905, pg.585 (Online)
- "Girardet, Paul". In: Ulrich Thieme, Fred. C. Willis (Eds.): Allgemeines Lexikon der Bildenden Künstler von der Antike bis zur Gegenwart, Vol.14: Giddens–Gress. E. A. Seemann, Leipzig 1921, pg.167 (Online)
- René Burnand: L'étonnante histoire de Girardet. Artistes suisses. La Baconnière, Neuchâtel 1940.
- (in German) Renate Treydel: Girardet, Paul. In: Allgemeines Künstlerlexikon. Die Bildenden Künstler aller Zeiten und Völker (AKL). Band 55, Saur, München u. a. 2007, ISBN 978-3-598-22795-0, S. 191
