= Jules Girardet =

French painter

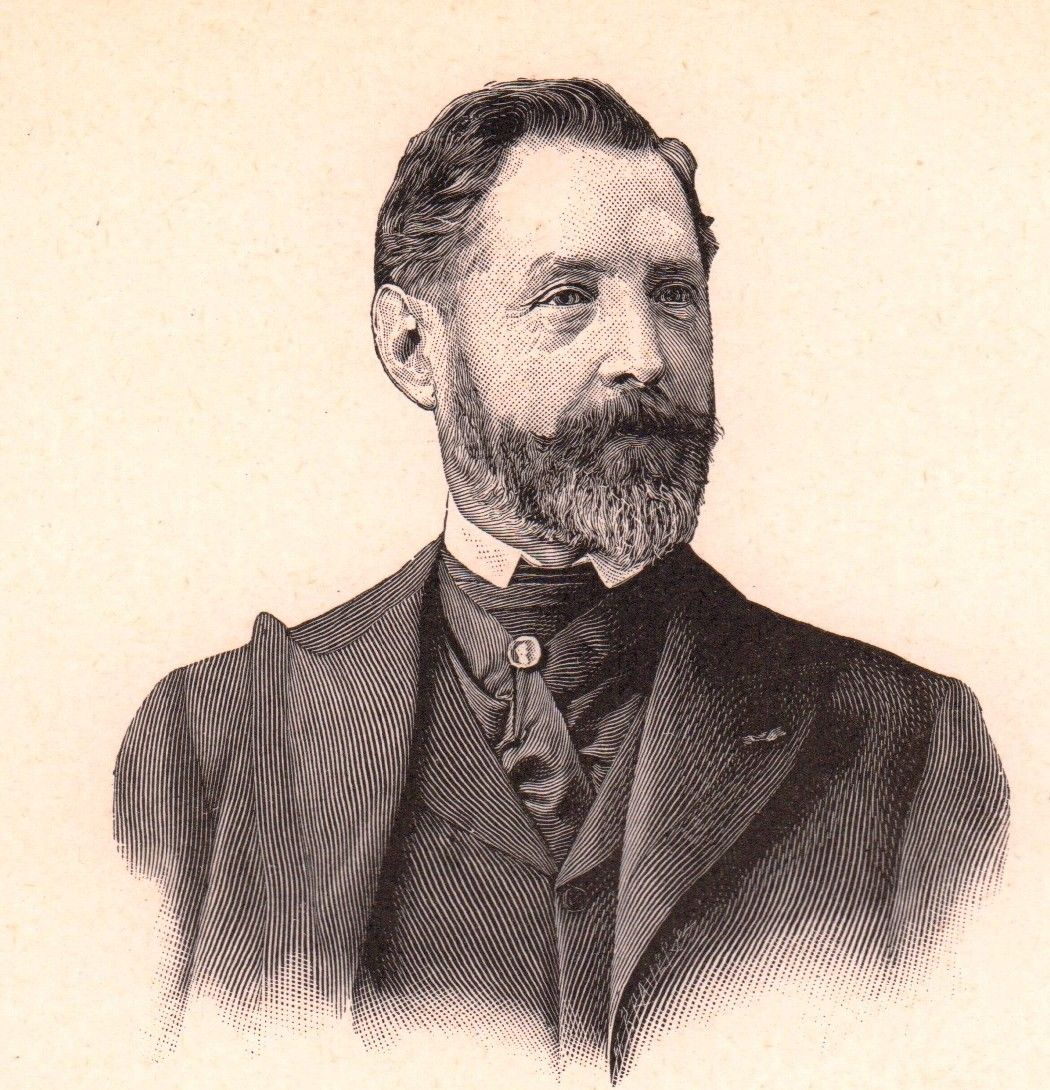
Jules Girardet (c.1904)

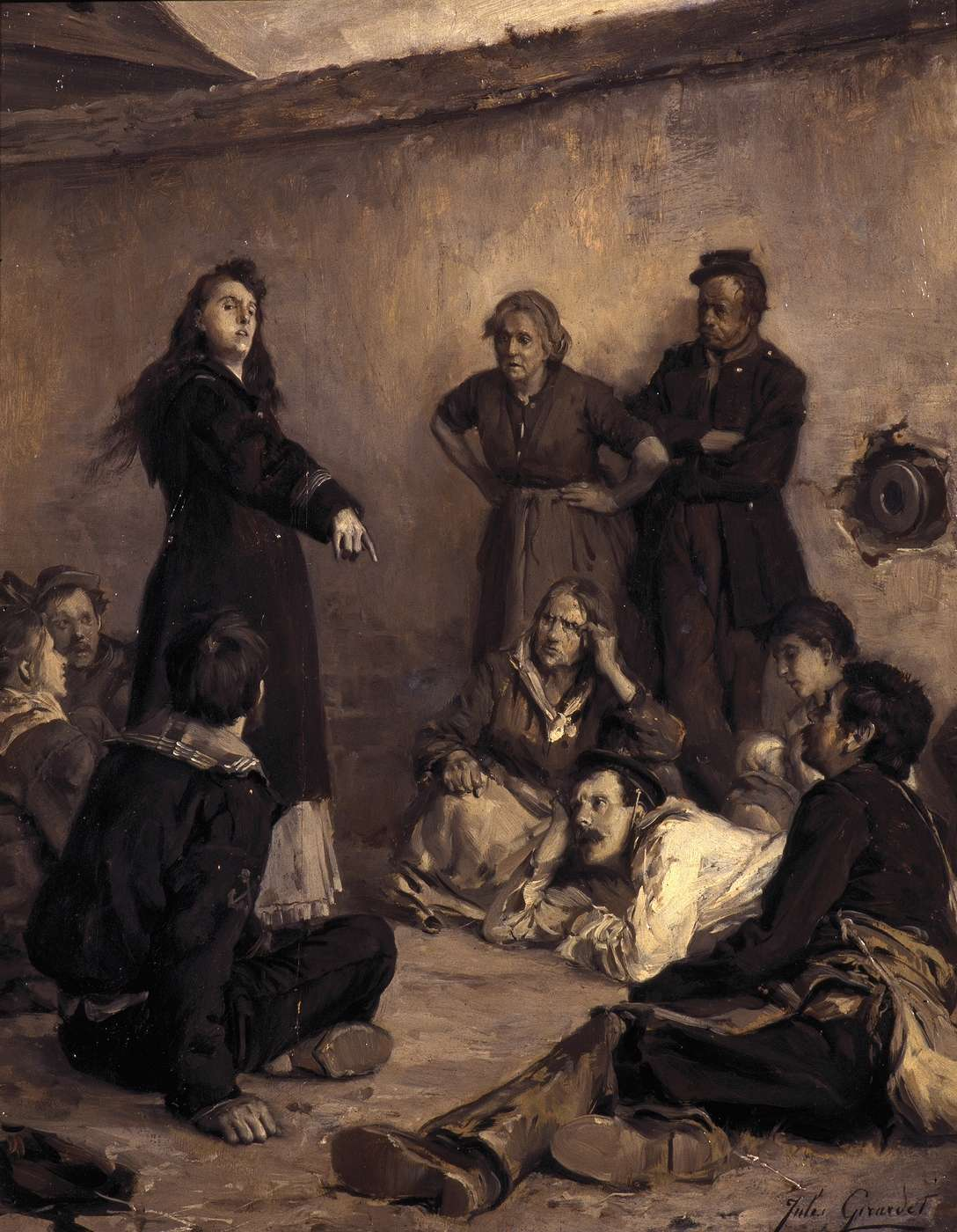
Louise Michel at Satory in 1871 (date unknown)

Jules Girardet (French pronunciation: [ʒyl ʒiʁaʁdɛ]; 10 April 1856, in Versailles – 25 January 1938, in Boulogne-Billancourt) was a French painter and illustrator of Swiss ancestry.

== Biography ==
He came from a Swiss Huguenot family. His father was the engraver, Paul Girardet.

He studied at the École des Beaux-arts and in the studios of Alexandre Cabanel. After several trips to North Africa with his brother Eugène, a noted Orientalist painter, he chose instead to concentrate on genre scenes and history painting. The Commune and Louise Michel were favorite topics.

He married in 1881 and built a house with a studio in Boulogne-Billancourt. That same year, he began to exhibit at the Salon. He won a Silver Medal at the Exposition Universelle (1889). In addition to his paintings, he illustrated several books, including Mademoiselle de Fierlys by Frédéric Dillaye (who died in the infamous fire at the Bazar de la Charité) and Tartarin de Tarascon by Alphonse Daudet. His brothers Léon, Paul Armand and Théodore were also painters or engravers, as was his sister, Julia Antonine (1851–1921).
