= Léon Girardet =

French painter

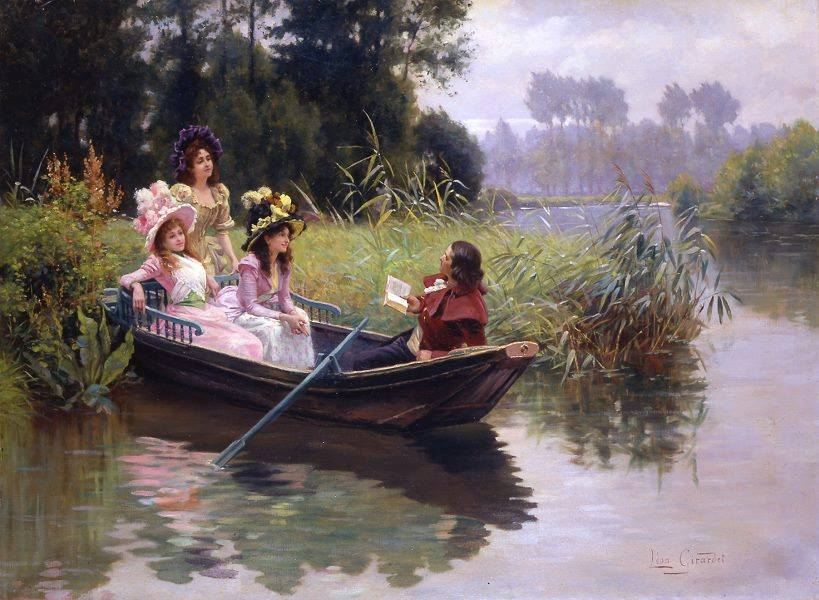
The Poet

Léon Girardet (French pronunciation: [leɔ̃ ʒiʁaʁdɛ]; 10 April 1856, Versailles - 3 December 1895, Neuilly-sur-Seine) was a French painter and engraver of Swiss ancestry.

== Life and work ==
He came from a Swiss Huguenot family. His father, Paul Girardet, was a copper engraver. His brothers, Jules, Eugène, Paul Armand and Théodore, as well as his sister, Julia Antonine (1851–1921), also became painters or engravers.

His initial artistic studies were at the École Nationale Supérieure des Beaux-Arts in Paris, with Alexandre Cabanel.

From 1878 to 1879, he accompanied his parents on a trip to Algeria, in hopes of improving his poor health. He returned there again in 1880, with Eugène und Jules. These trips resulted in a number of Orientalist paintings, inspired by Eugène's works.

Most of his paintings were anecdotal genre scenes, intended for a middle-class audience. As such, they are very relaxed in mood and tone; depicting people interacting in conversation or simple chores. As an engraver, he was only involved in reproducing his father's templates. He exhibited in both France and Switzerland.

His health failed to improve, and he died at the age of thirty-nine.
