= Eugène Girardet =

French painter

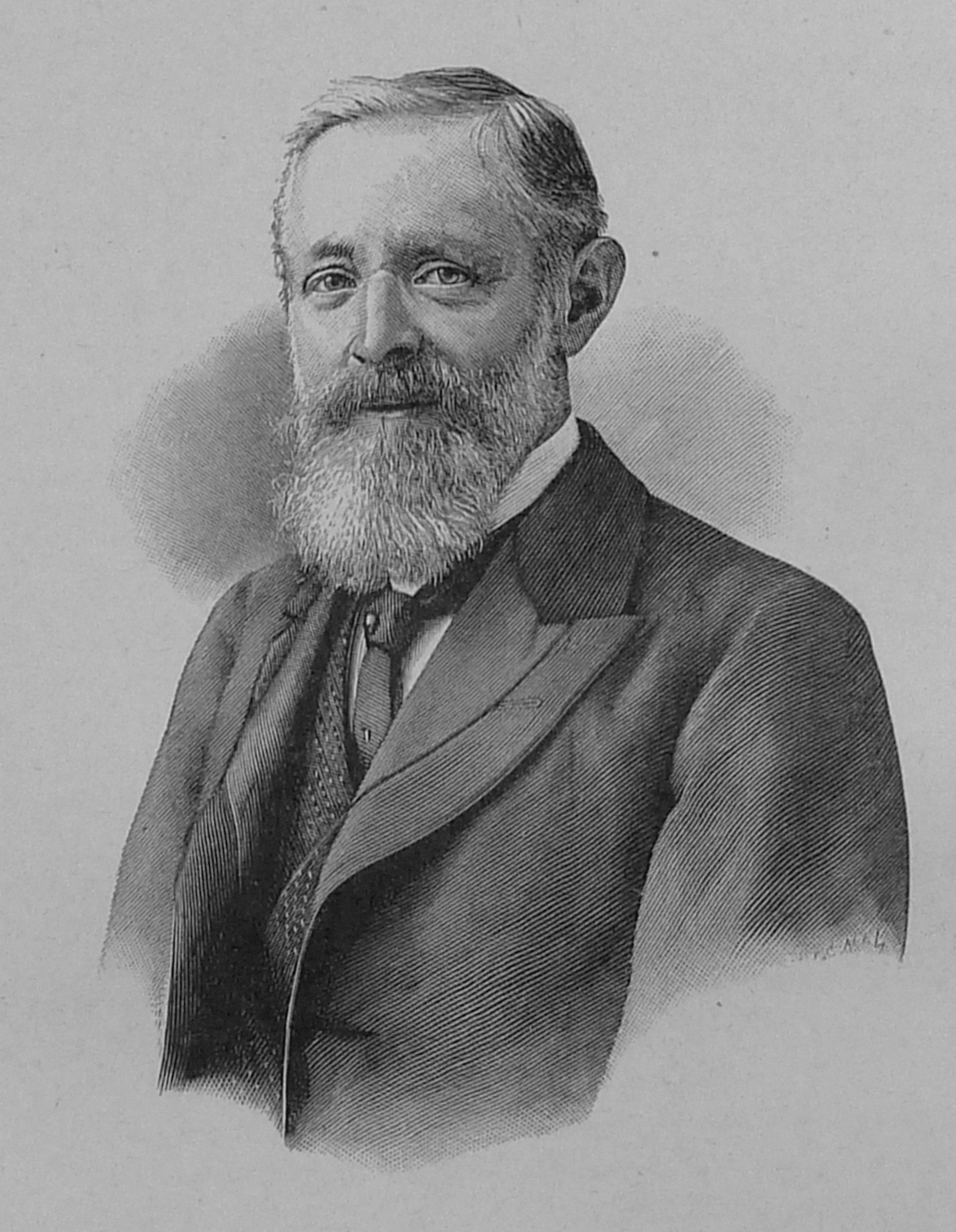
- Portrait from the Album Mariani (1908)
- Born: Eugène Alexis Girardet; 31 May 1853; Paris, France
- Died: 5 May 1907 (aged 53); Paris, France
- Education: École des Beaux-arts, Paris; Studio of Jean-Léon Gérôme
- Known for: Painter
- Movement: Orientalist

Eugène Alexis Girardet (French pronunciation: [øʒɛn alɛksi ʒiʁaʁdɛ]; 31 May 1853 – 5 May 1907) was a French Orientalist painter of Swiss ancestry.

== Biography ==
He came from a Swiss Huguenot family. His father was the engraver Paul Girardet. His siblings, Jules, Léon, Paul Armand, Théodore and Julia Antonine (1851–1921), all became artists. After learning engraving from his father, he studied at the École des Beaux-arts and in the studios of Jean-Léon Gérôme, who encouraged him to visit North Africa in 1874. He also spent some time in Spain.

In all, he made eight trips to Algeria after 1879 (some with Jules and Léon), especially to the south, around the oases of Biskra, El Kantara and Bou Saâda, where he worked with Étienne Dinet. In 1898, he visited Egypt and Palestine, producing many works depicting the lives of desert nomads. Unlike other Orientalists, he produced no harem scenes. Upon returning to France, he became a teacher at the Académie Julian.

He exhibited regularly at the Salon and with the Société des Peintres Orientalistes Français (of which he was one of the founding members), with major shows at the Exposition Universelle (1900), where he won a gold medal, and the Exposition Coloniale de Marseille of 1906. He also showed his works at the Glaspalast in Munich.

He was interred at the Père-Lachaise Cemetery. In addition to several museums in France, his works may be seen at the Dahesh Museum of Art and the National Museum of Fine Arts of Algiers, as well as at museums in Switzerland and New York City.

He was married first to Maria Wickham (1855-1923), and finally to Gabrielle Girardet née Bazaille (1849-1930). Nelly, one of his daughters with Wickham, married Louis Charles Breguet, famous French aviation pioneer.

== Selected paintings ==
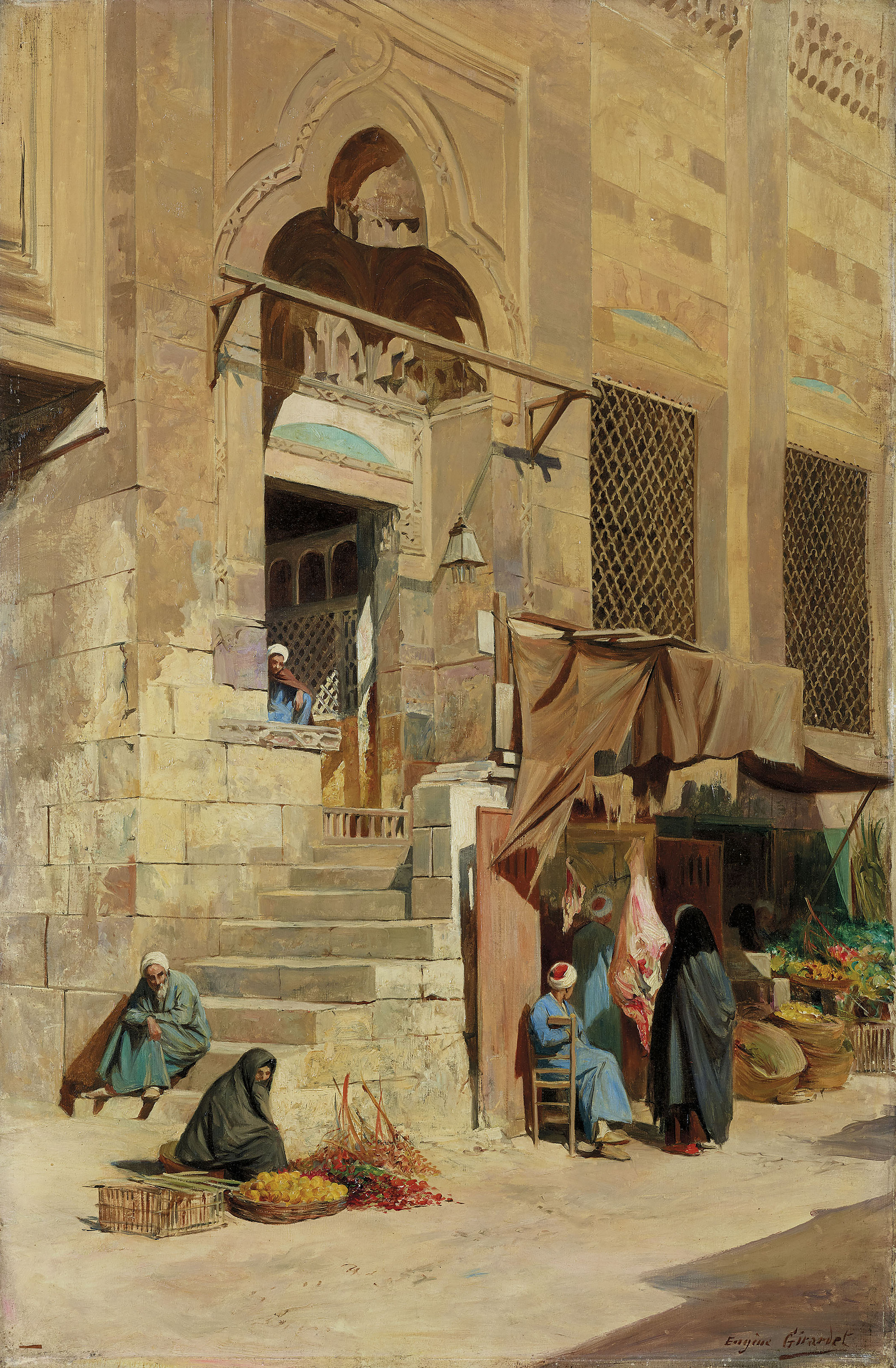
Al-Azhar Mosque, Cairo

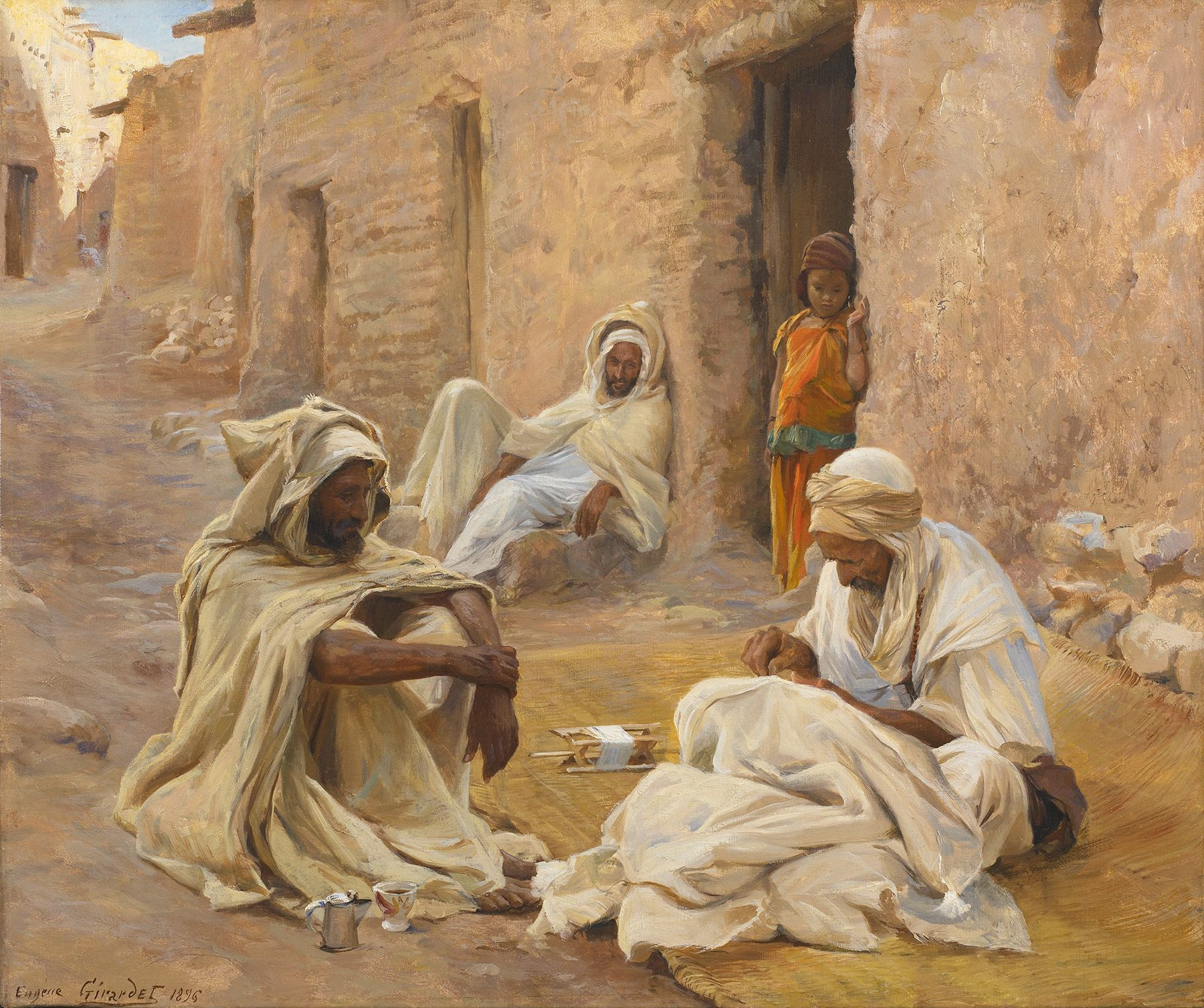
The Tailor

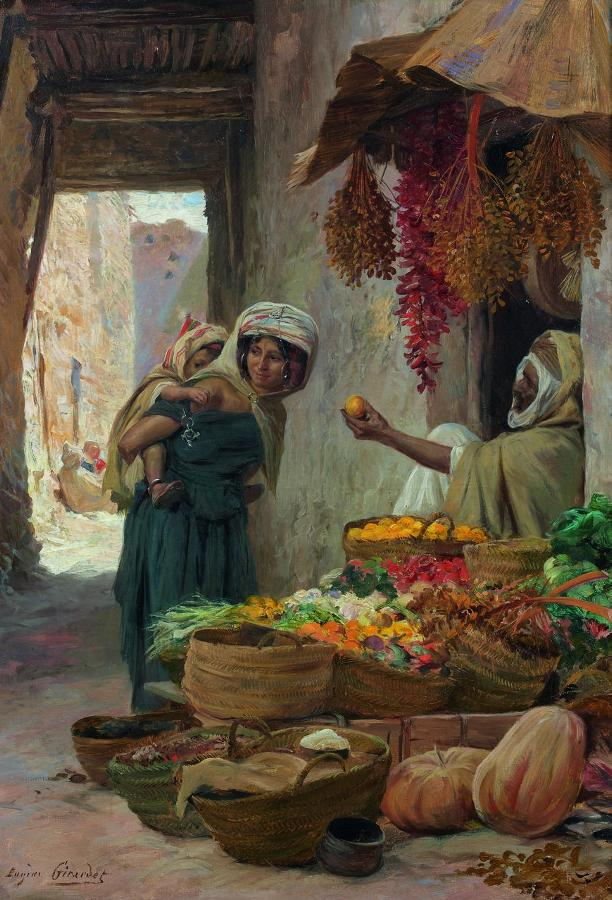
The Fruit Seller

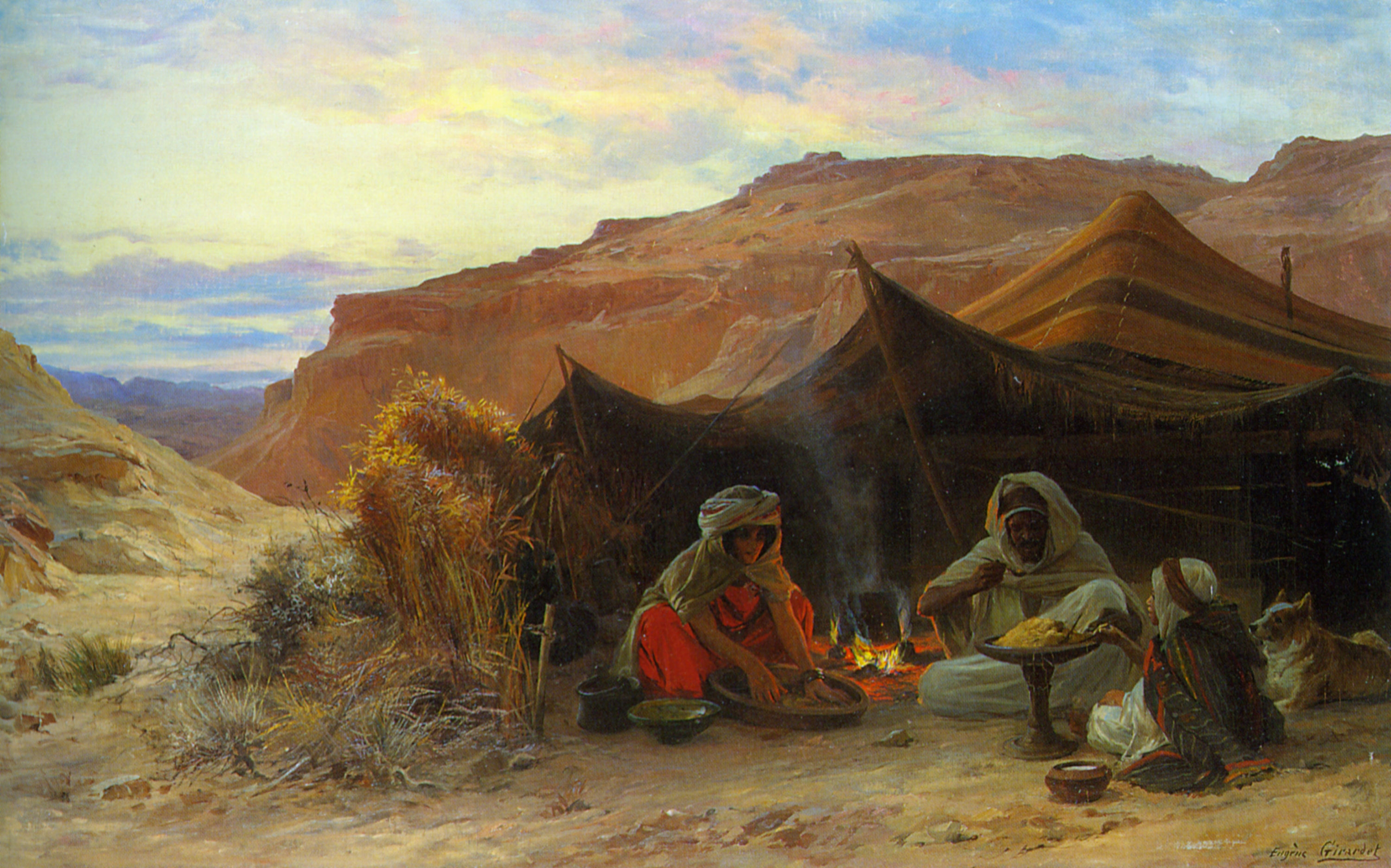
Bedouins in the Desert

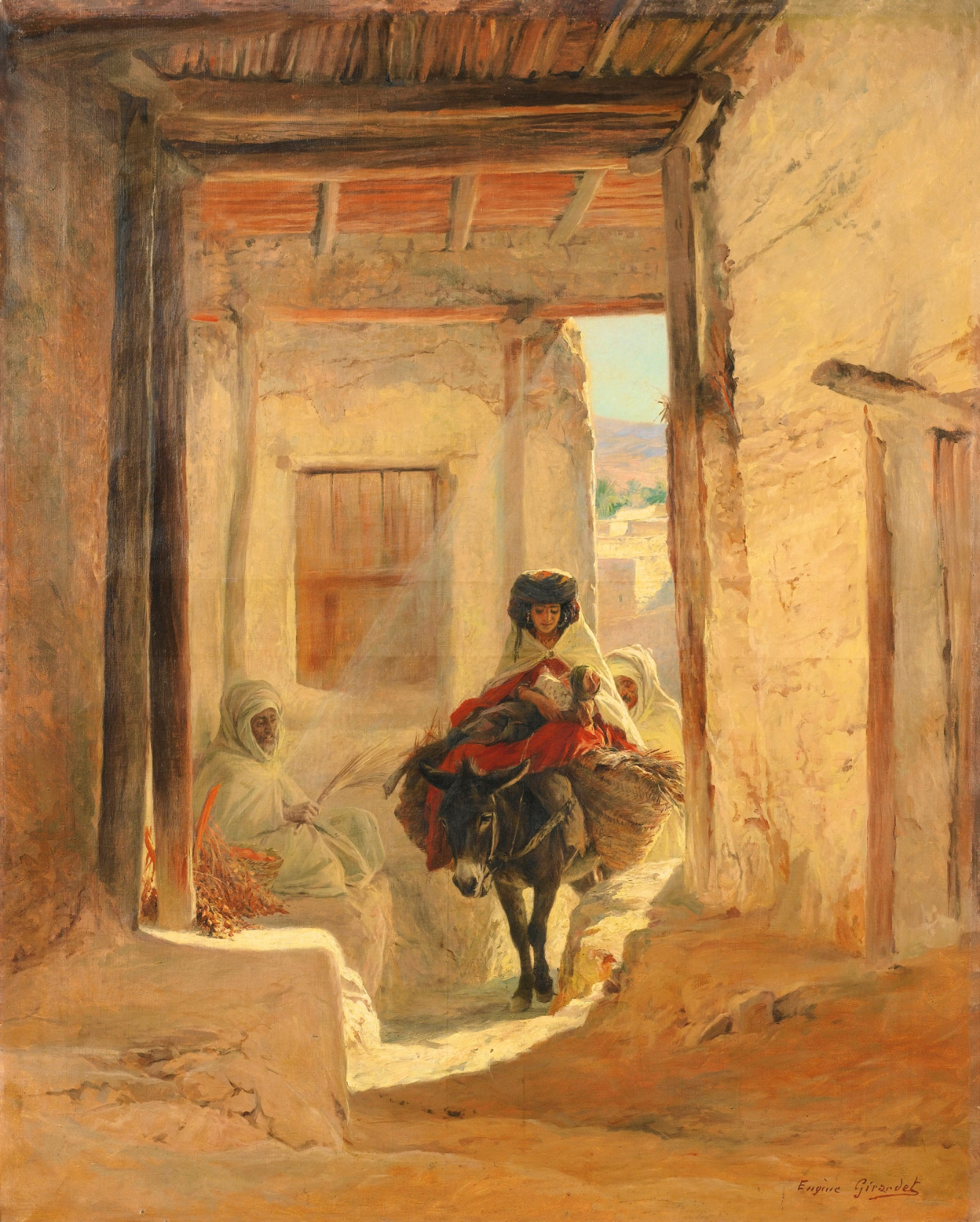
Passage to Bou Saâda
