= Berthe Girardet =

French sculptor

- Born: 8 April 1861; Marseille, France
- Died: 6 December 1948 (aged 87); Neuilly-sur-Seine, France
- Occupation: Sculptor

Berthe Girardet, née Imer (8 April 1861 – 6 December 1948) was a French sculptor. Her work was part of the art competitions at the 1924 Summer Olympics and the 1928 Summer Olympics.
