= L'Illustration =

Weekly French newspaper published from 1843 to 1944

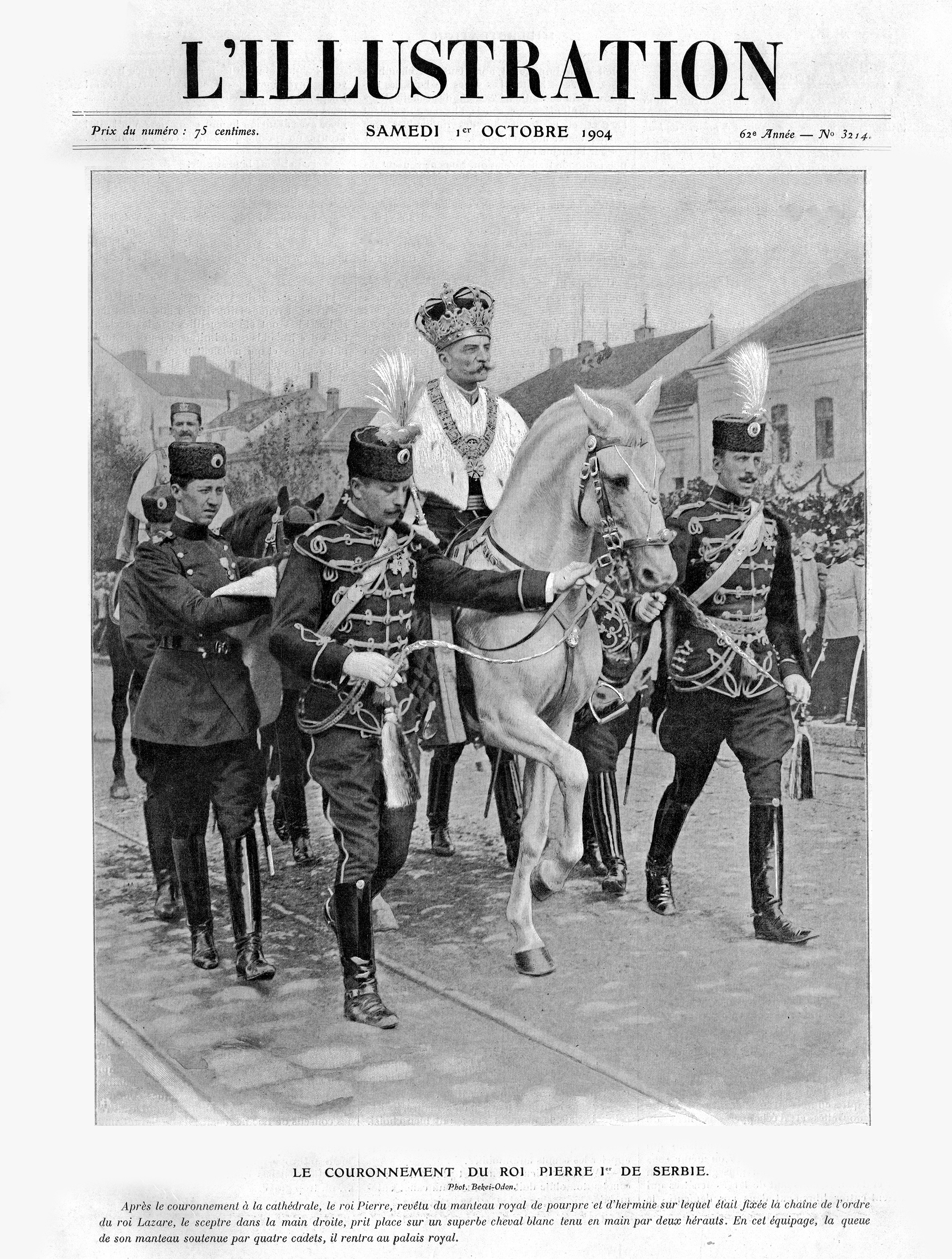
- Front page of 1 October 1904 edition (Coronation of Peter I of Serbia)
- Founder(s): Édouard Charton; Adolphe Joanne
- Editor-in-chief: Edmond Texier (after 1860)
- Founded: 4 March 1843
- Ceased publication: 1944
- Language: French
- Headquarters: Paris, Saint-Mandé, Bobigny
- Country: France
- Circulation: weekly
- ISSN: 0246-9251
- Website: https://www.lillustration.com

L'Illustration (French pronunciation: [lilystʁasjɔ̃]; 1843–1944) was a French illustrated weekly newspaper published in Paris. It was founded by Édouard Charton with the first issue published on 4 March 1843, it became the first illustrated newspaper in France then, after 1906, the first international illustrated magazine; distributed in 150 countries.

== History ==
In 1891, L'Illustration became the first French newspaper to publish a photograph. Many of these photographs came from syndicated photo-press agencies like Chusseau-Flaviens, but the publication also employed its own photographers such as Léon Gimpel and others. In 1907, L'Illustration was the first to publish a color photograph. It also published Gaston Leroux' novel Le mystère de la chambre jaune as a serial a year before its 1908 release. La Petite Illustration was the name of the supplement to L'Illustration that published fiction, plays, and other arts-related material.

During the Second World War, while it was owned by the Baschet family, L'Illustration supported Marshal Philippe Pétain's Révolution nationale, but turned down pro-German articles by French aristocrat and diplomat Jacques Bouly de Lesdain. However, Lesdain later became its political editor.

The magazine was shut down in 1944 following the Liberation of Paris. Another version re-opened in 1945 under the name France-Illustration, but went bankrupt in 1957.

== Notable contributors ==
=== Editor-in-chief ===
- Gaston Sorbets (from 1923).

=== Journalists ===
- Gustave Babin

=== Writers ===
- Brada

=== Notable photographers ===
- Joshua Benoliel
- Victor Bulla
- Blanquart-Evrard
- Brébisson
- Disdéri
- Jules Gervais-Courtellemont
- Léon Gimpel
- Jimmy Hare
- Gustave Le Gray
- Mayer et Pierson

=== Notable illustrators (1843–1914) ===
- Andriolli
- Bertall
- Pharamond Blanchard
- Karl Bodmer
- Joseph-Félix Bouchor
- Alexandre Jean-Baptiste Brun
- Eugène Burnand
- Cami
- Caran d'Ache
- Cham
- Henry Cheffer
- Dagnan-Bouveret
- Draner
- Durand-Brager
- Jules Férat
- Forain
- Gustave Fraipont
- Gavarni
- Henry Gerbault
- Henri Gervex
- Victor Gabriel Gilbert
- Jules Girardet
- Karl Girardet
- Serge Ivanoff
- Grandville
- Eugène Grasset
- Albert Guillaume
- Dudley Hardy
- Charles Hoffbauer
- Janet-Lange
- Jeanniot
- Lucien Jonas
- Kupka
- Jules Laurens
- Charles Léandre
- Lorsay
- Louis Malteste
- Malo-Renault
- Alfons Mucha
- Louis Rémy Sabattier
- Georges Scott

== Gallery ==
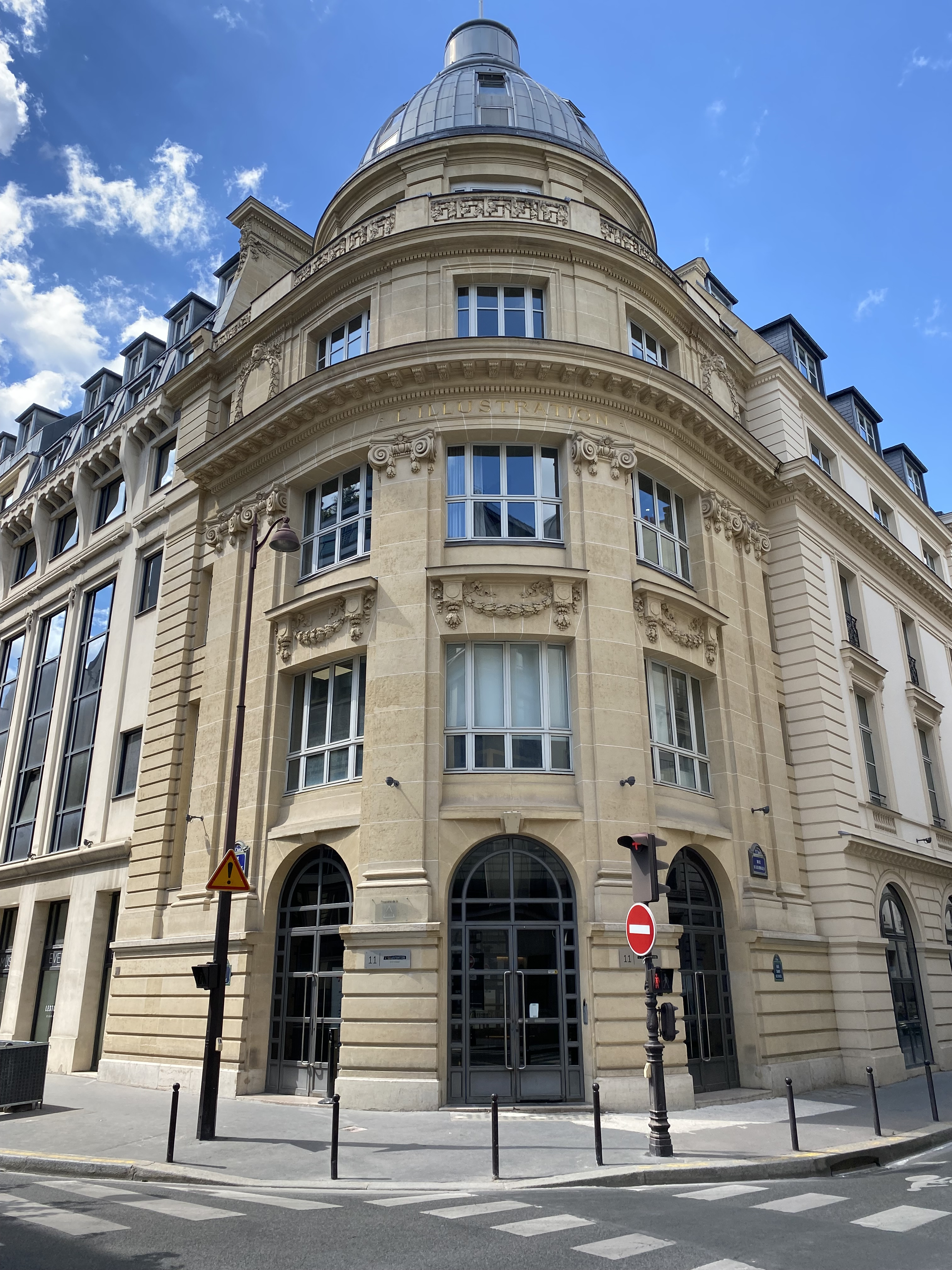
Former head office of L'Illustration in Paris, angle of rue Saint-Georges and rue de la Victoire

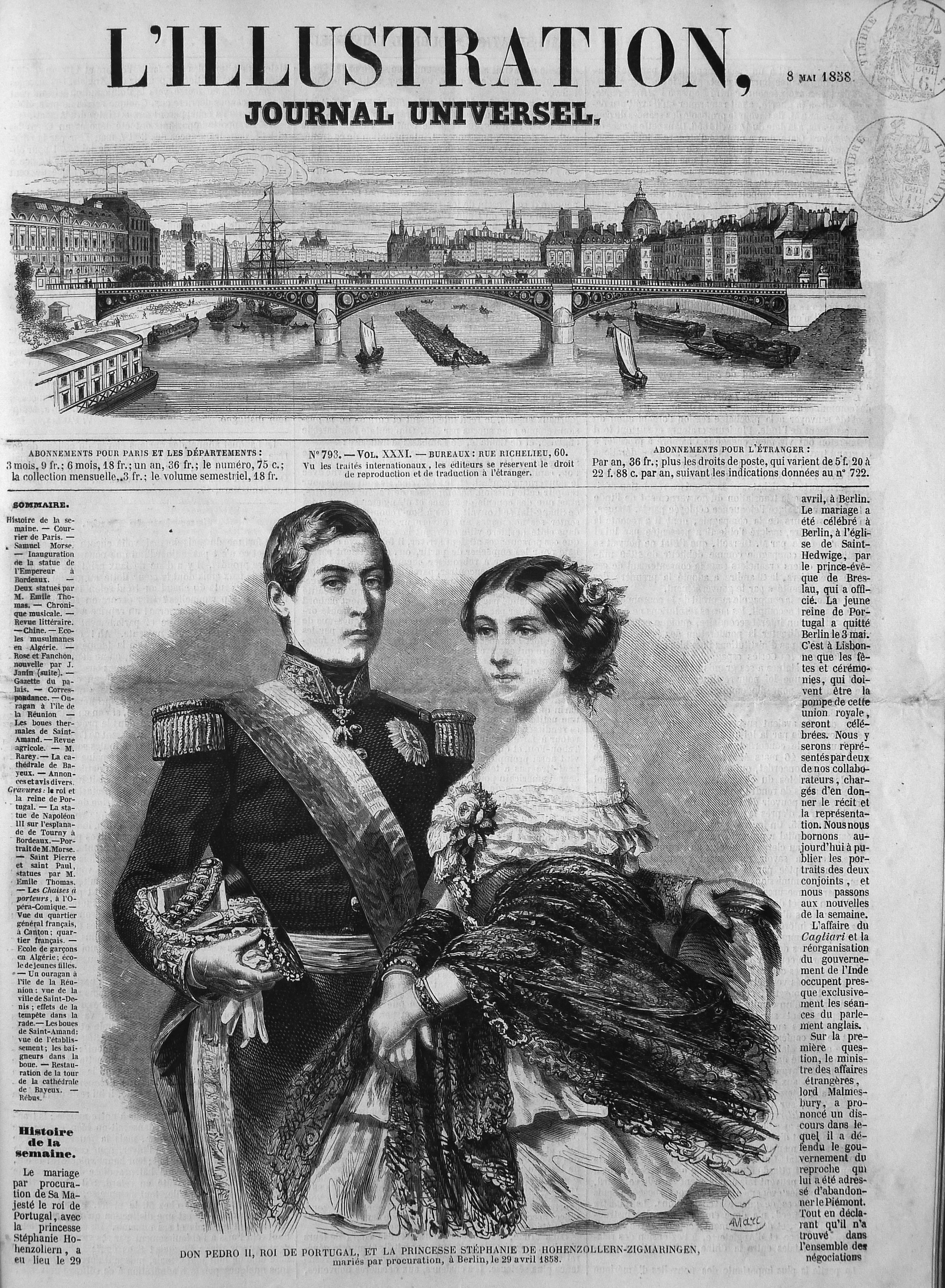
Wedding of Pedro V of Portugal
(3 November 1860)

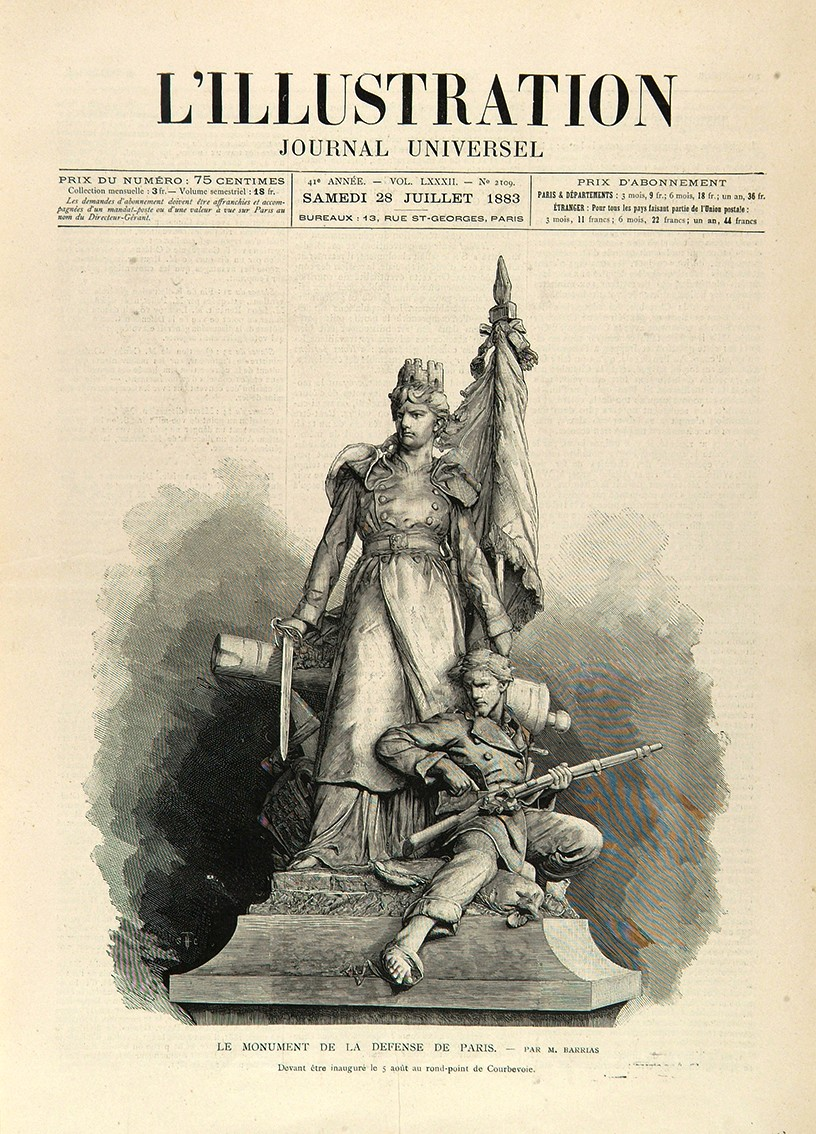
La Défense de Paris
(28 July 1883)

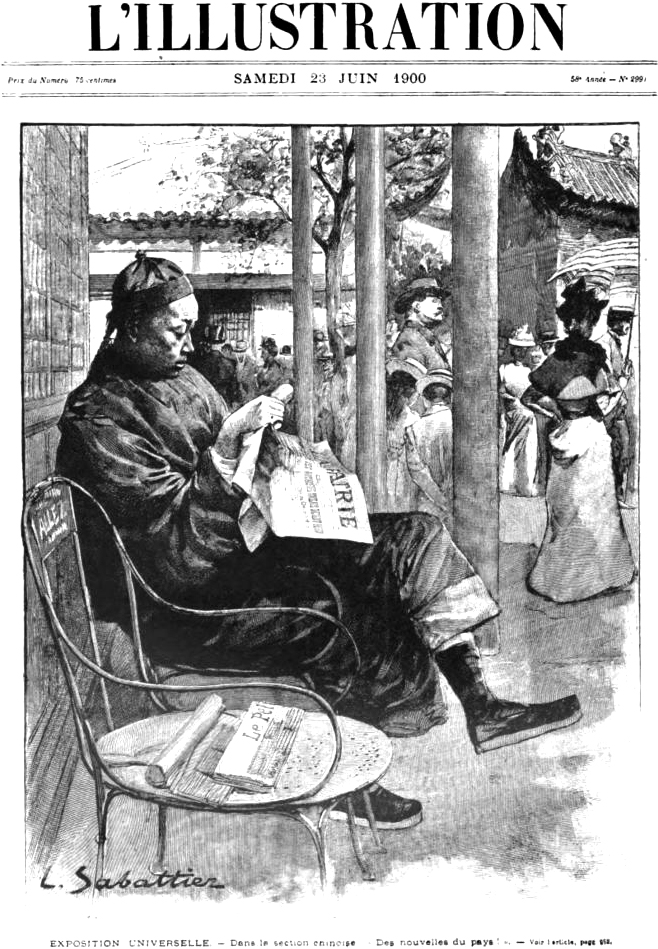
Exposition Universelle
(23 June 1900)

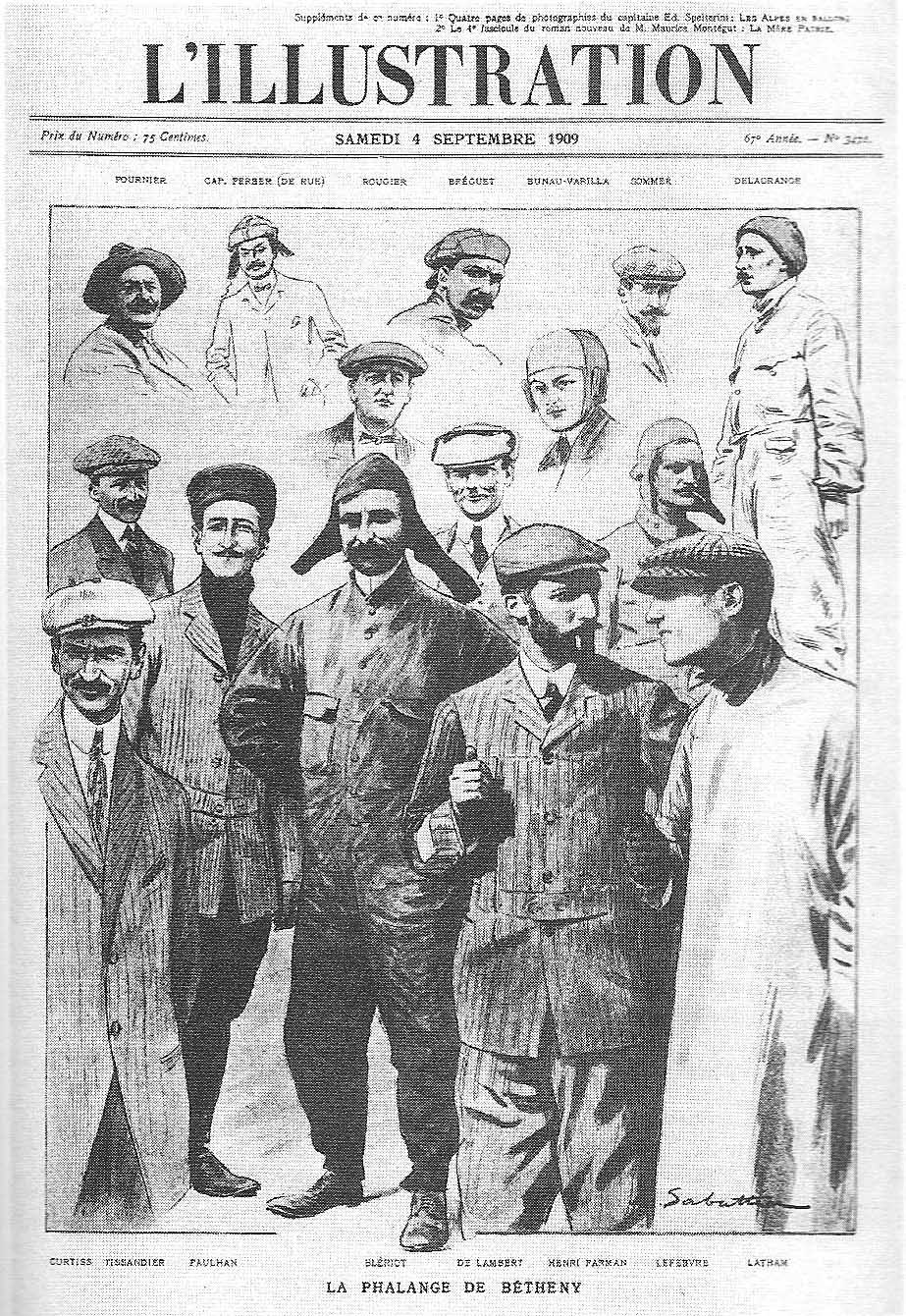
Louis Blériot
(4 September 1909)

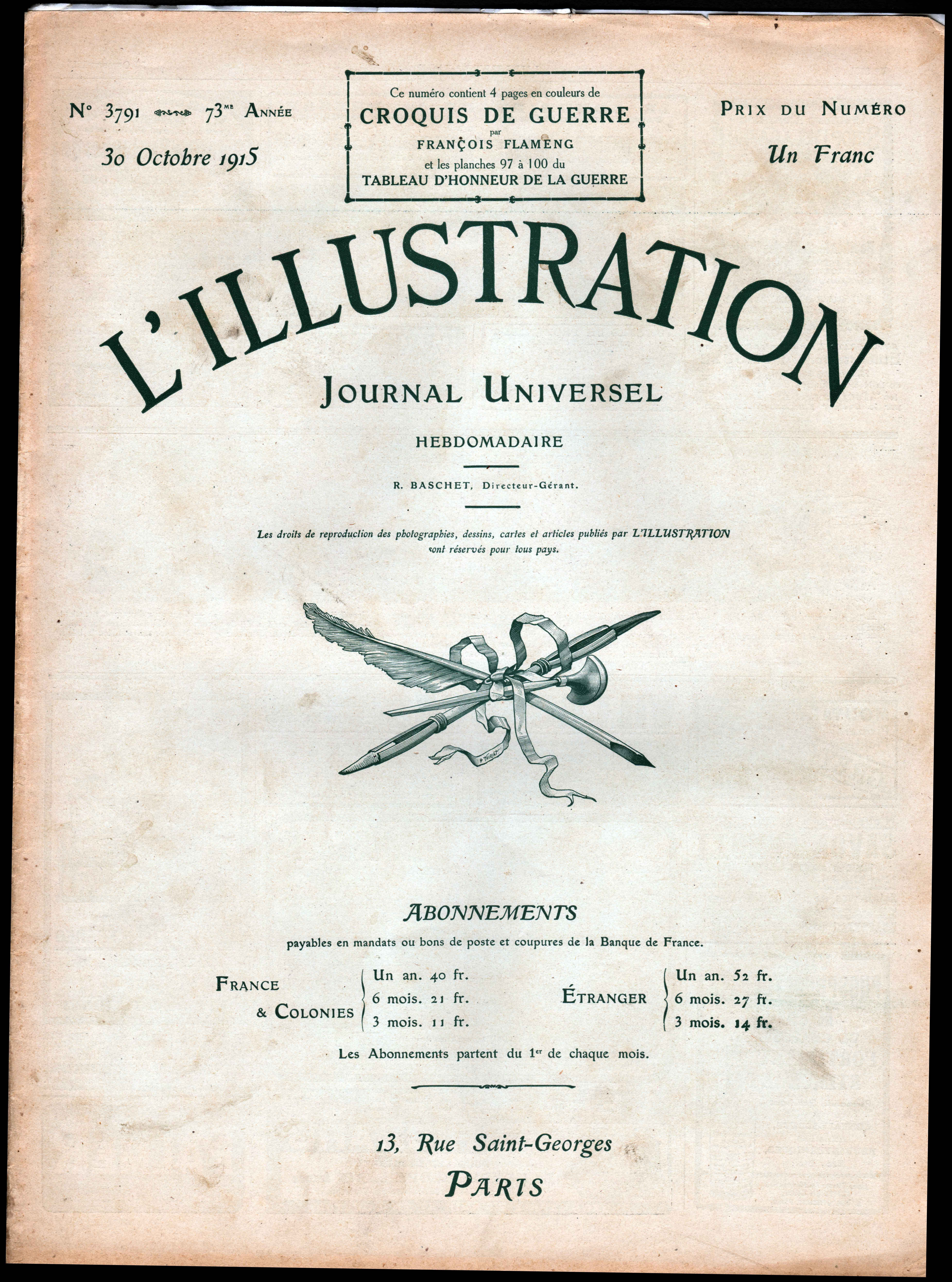
First World War
30 October 1915

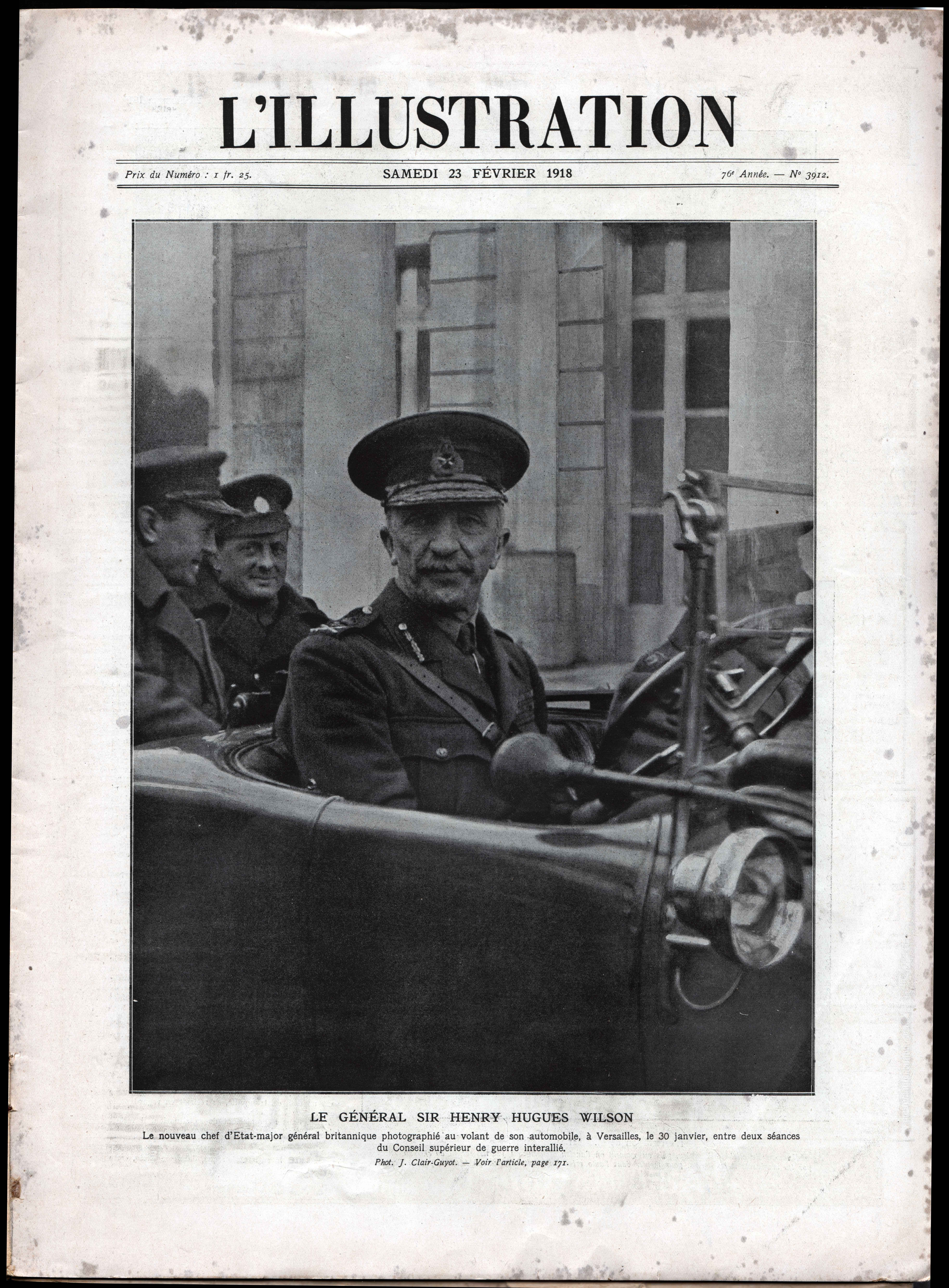
General Henry Wilson
(23 February 1918)

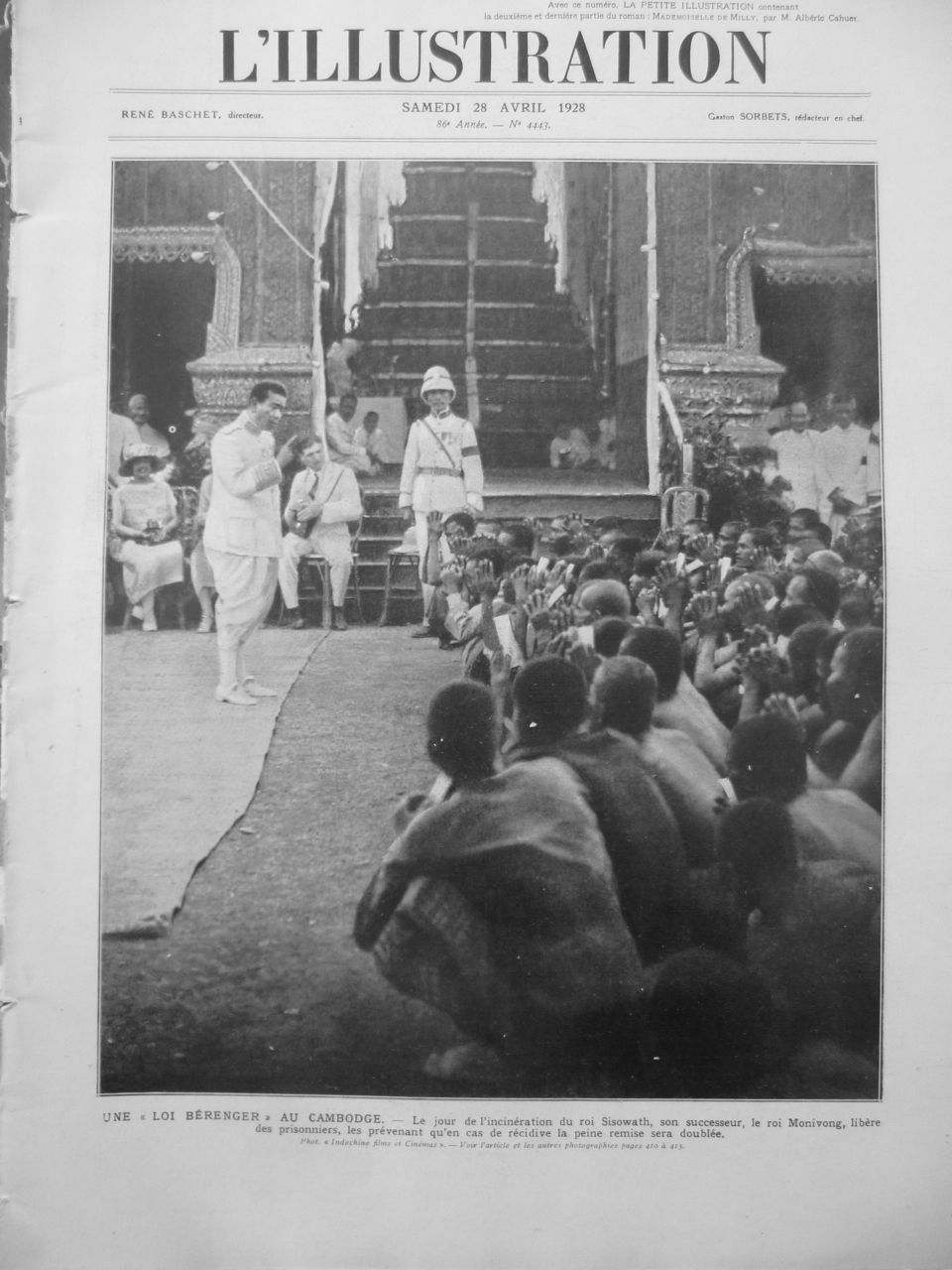
Funeral of King Sisowath
(28 April 1928)

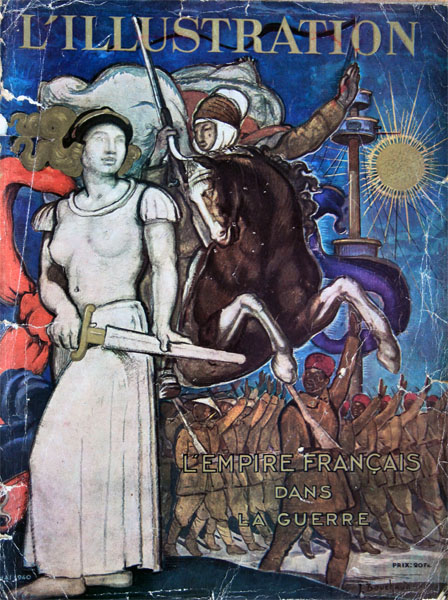
Allegory of France
(11 May 1940)

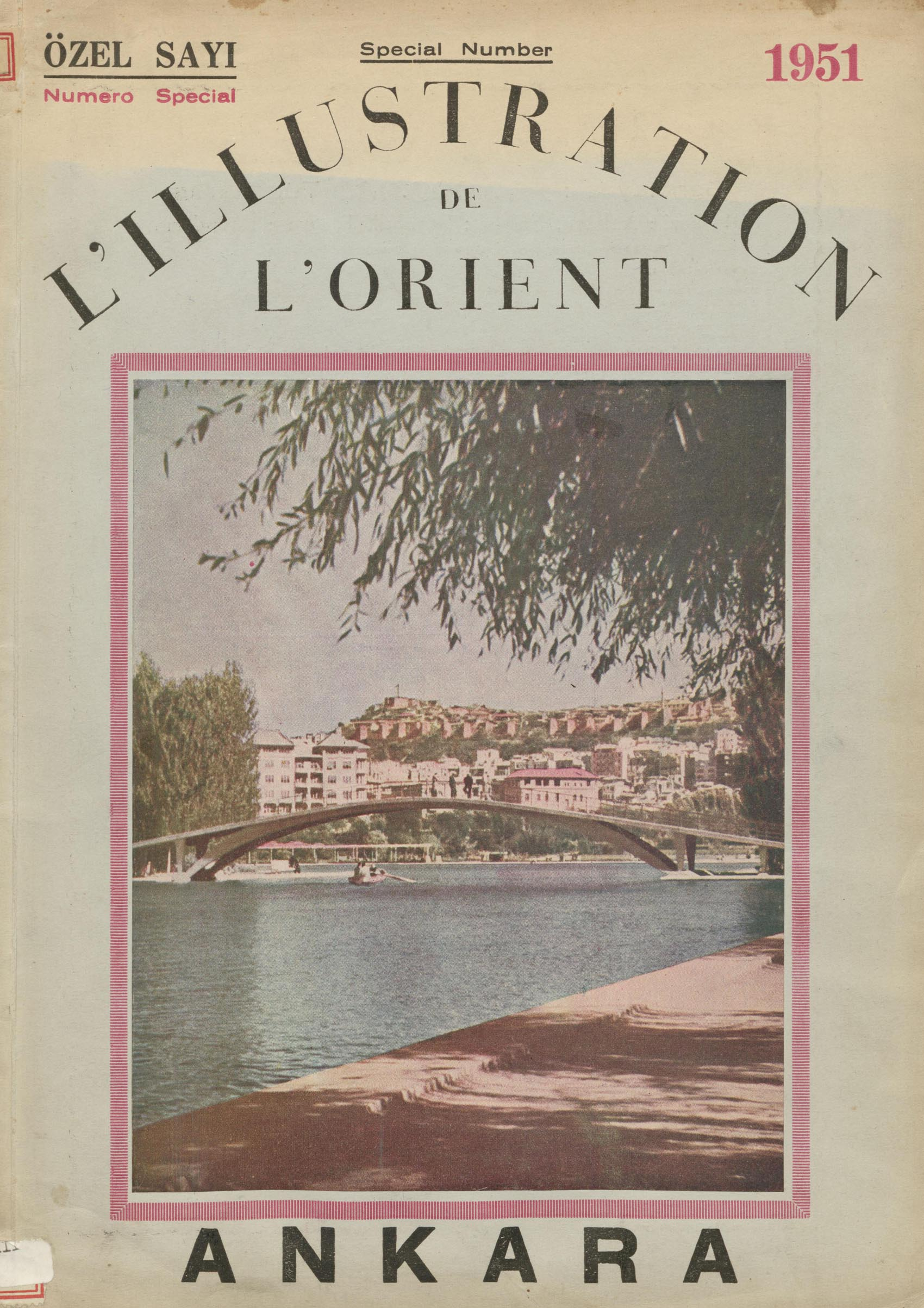
Gençlik Park, Ankara
(1951 Special edition)

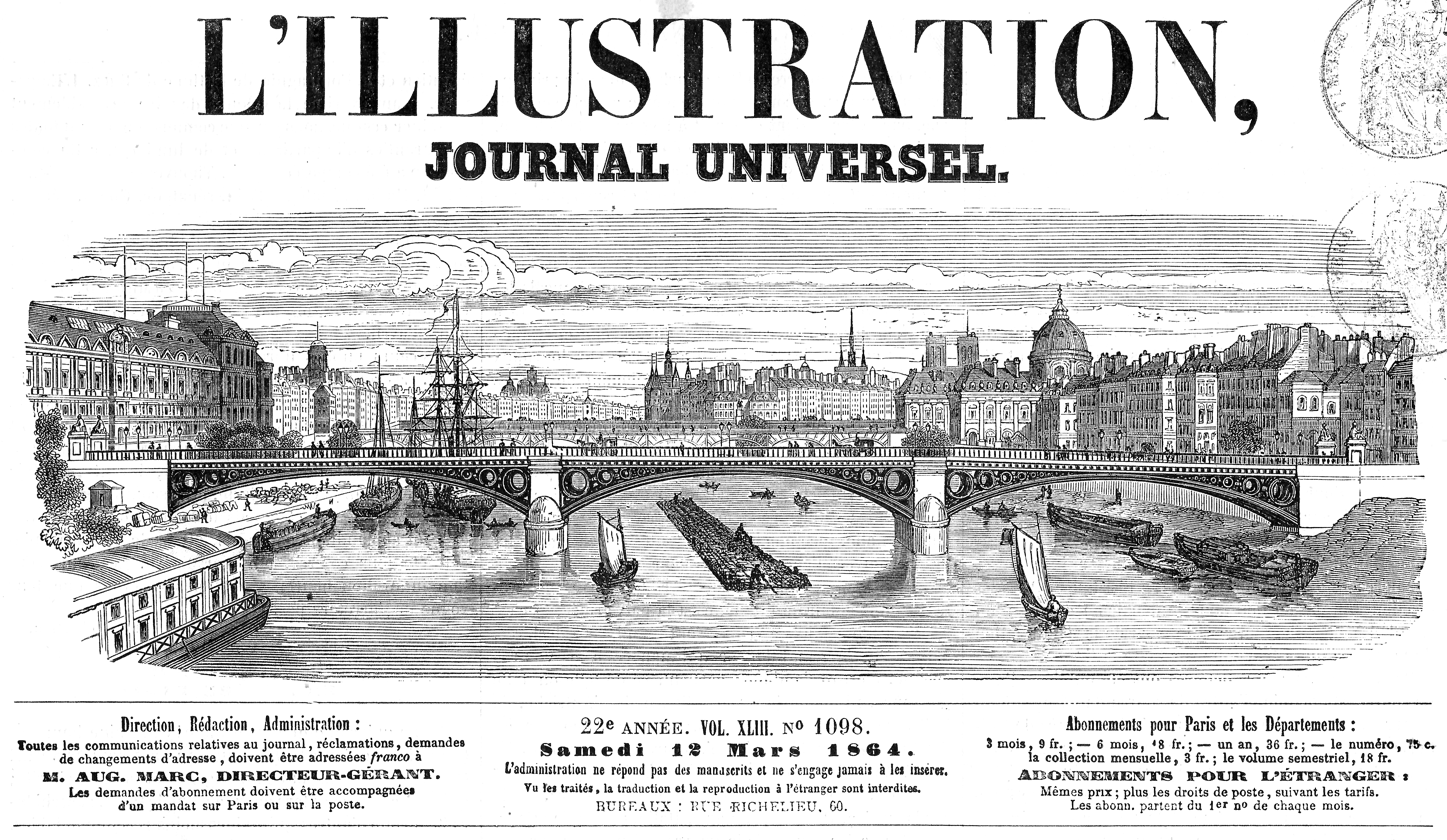
Masthead
(1864)
