= Le Carreau des Halles =

1880 genre painting by Victor Gabriel Gilbert

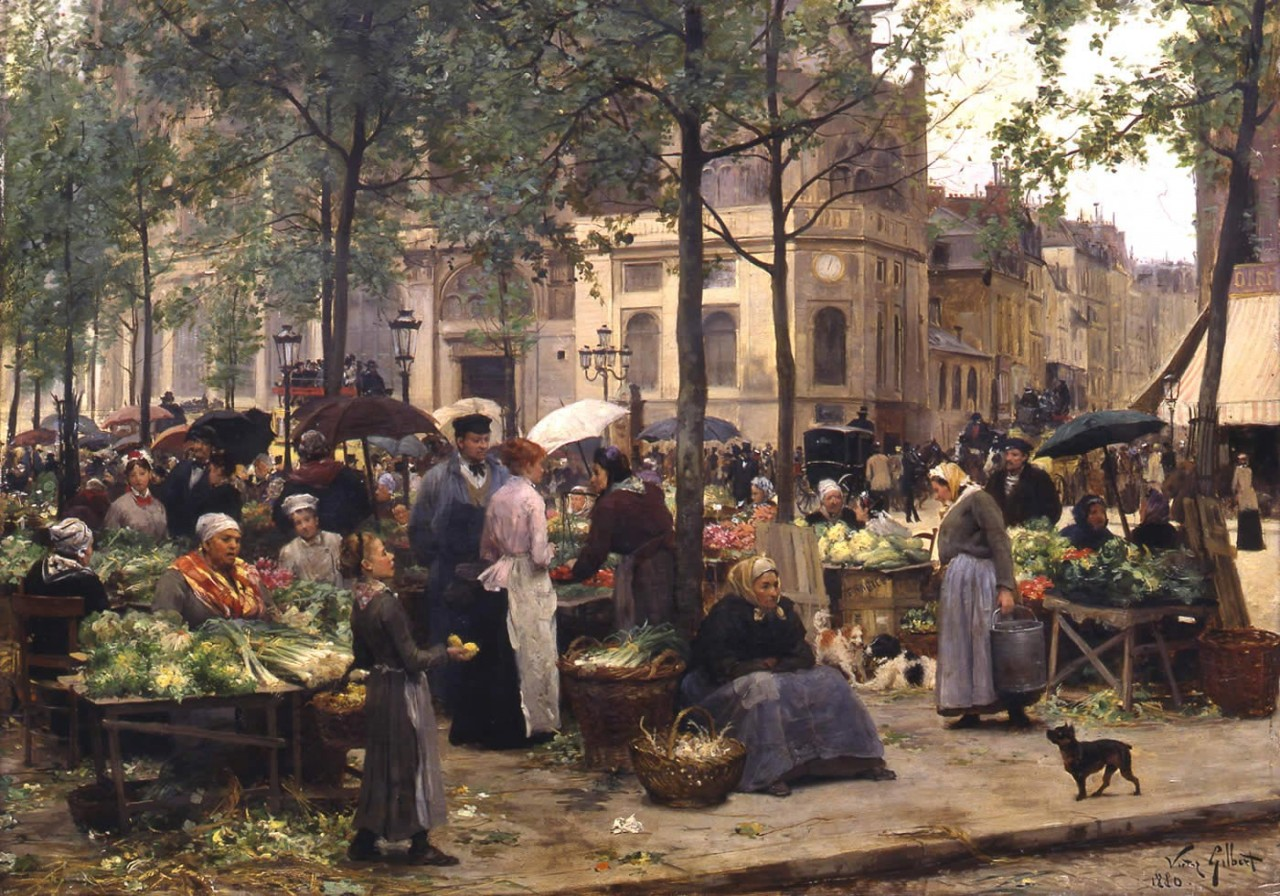
- Artist: Victor Gabriel Gilbert
- Year: 1880
- Medium: Oil on canvas
- Dimensions: 537 mm × 737 mm (21.1 in × 29.0 in)
- Location: MuMa, Le Havre

Le Carreau des Halles is a painting by French genre painter Victor Gabriel Gilbert. Gilbert painted the square in front of Les Halles in oil on canvas in 1880. Created during a period of intense political and social change, it reflects the efforts of the Third Republic to promote an image of a stable, moral, and revitalized city. Influenced by both the realism and later impressionism techniques, Gilbert portrays everyday life with a blend of documentary precision and atmospheric light. His interests in Parisian markets contributed to the visual narrative of Paris as an orderly metropolis, and helped establish him as a leading painter of urban life in the late 19th century.

== Historical context ==
From the 1870s to 1890s, momentous changes took place in France. After the Franco-Prussian War, the working class established the Paris Commune in 1871. Although the Third Republic regained control of Paris within two months, the trauma fostered by the siege and the Commune lasted. Paris made efforts to regain credibility and successfully projected a vision of a moral, ordered, and healthy modern metropolis in the 1878 Paris Exposition.

Built between 1854 and 1874 as the central market, Les Halles witnessed and contributed to the changes in Paris. Under the direction of Napoleon III, Victor Baltard designed the new Halles, which was long associated with vice. The carreau ('square') of Les Halles was one of the most significant zones for artists interested in the commerce and intermingling of people. This world of rural farming meeting the booming metropolis is where Emile Zola begins Le Ventre de Paris. Since Gilbert was familiar with Naturalist literature, specifically with the novels of Zola, he was aware of the author's view of Les Halles as a symbol of the dynamism and energy of Paris. As French historian Pascal Ory noted, "France is not a country with an ordinary relation to food. In the national vulgate food is one of the distinctive ingredients, if not the distinctive ingredient, of French identity." Thus this painting is rooted in the contradictions, anxieties, and aspirations that the fin-de-siècle representation of the culinary world could engender.

== Background ==
As the anarchist ideologies destabilized French society, the artists of the generation were often deeply embroiled in the social issues. The Realist and Impressionist movement was embraced by many progressive artists, including Victor Gilbert. Departing from his early focus on decorative still life genre painting, Gilbert gradually turned to typical themes of Realist arts and promoted a realistic display of modern life. In this period, his dark palette aligns with the realist atmosphere, which may have been inspired by realist painter Francois Bonvin. As French taste turned to Impressionism, Gilbert later modified his style under its influence in order to search for new methods of representation. His style consistently went through transitions according to the times.

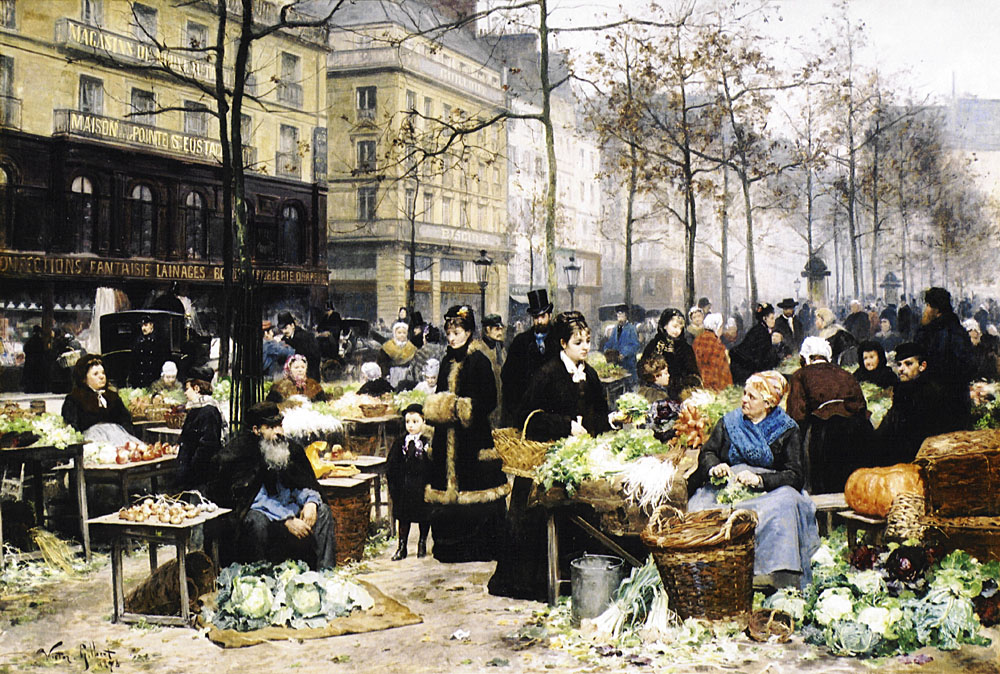
Gilbert, Le Marché aux légumes, 1878

At the 1880 Paris Salon, Gilbert's painting of the fish market was purchased by the state and he was awarded a second-class medal. He subsequently became a primary Realist painter of Les Halles, inspired by daily life from the street vendors to the homeless. His interest in the market as a lively center of urban life can also be seen in his other artworks, such as Le Marché aux légumes. He continued to exhibit street scenes at Salons, and won a silver medal at the 1889 Paris Exposition. The best period of his career for the food market subjects is considered to be between 1875 and 1890, during which Le Carreau des Halles was made.

== Description ==
The scene is a typical day at the carreau ('square'), the open section of Les Halles. Vendors, mostly working-class women, are selling vegetables, flowers, and other fresh produce. The mixture of a variety of social types, with farmers and urban laborers shoulder to shoulder presents class harmony. In the background, the Haussmannian buildings with ornate facades and a large clock tower suggest urban transformation, suggesting the carreau as a middle ground where the world of rural farming met the booming metropolis. Gilbert carefully composed the chaos to offer visual access to the neighborhood around the Les Halles by portraying the divided pathways and the rows between stalls. For all the animation, the scene offers a sense of order amid overwhelming activities. During a time of dramatic changes, this artwork served the propaganda needs of the Republicans to showcase Paris as recovered, healthy, and safe.

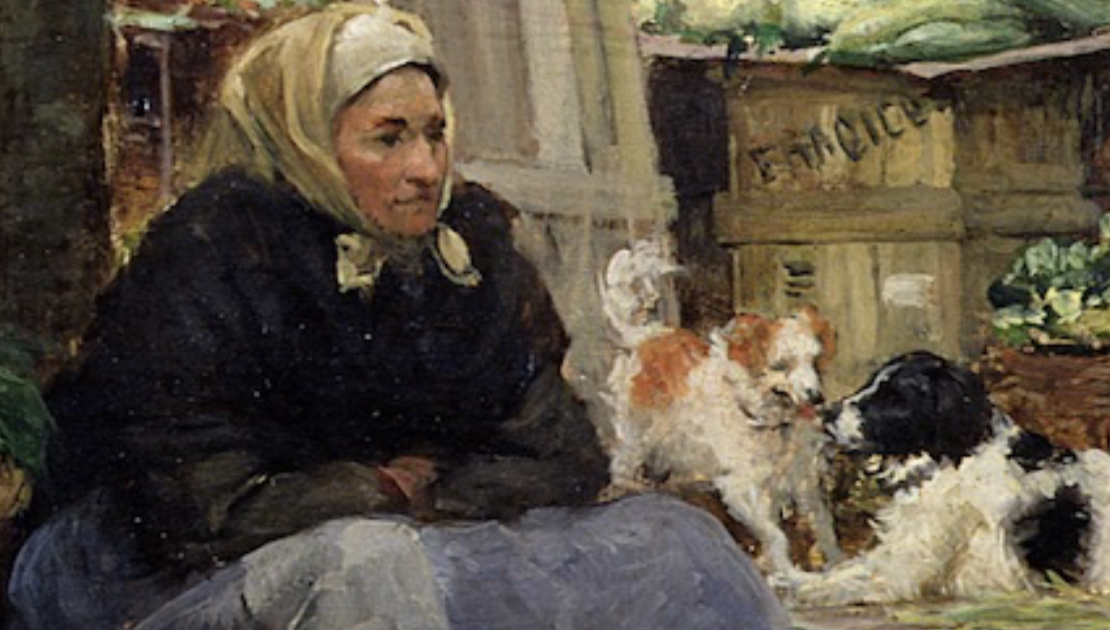
Detail of the seated woman

Gilbert's unidealized portrayal of ordinary people aligns with the Realist commitment to truthfully represent daily life and the dignity of the lower class. Emphasizing the patched clothing and tired but engaging expressions, Gilbert highlighted the stoicism and fortitude of rural types. The mood of the painting is perhaps best encapsulated by the woman seated in the foreground, whose nonplussed stoicism evokes Zola's description of the "calmness of the farm women with their bright headscarves and tanned faces amidst all this jabbering".

Technically, the overall treatment of light indicates reveals influences from Impressionism. Compared to his early works, the color tone Gilbert used has become brighter and softer while his compositions incorporated explorations of the effects of light. To be specific, Gilbert used looser brushwork to paint the dappled sunlight, capturing the fleeting moment. This focus on light and the changing qualities of everyday life blends realism with Impressionism experimentation.

== See also ==
- Gastronomy
- Haussmann's renovation of Paris

== Sources ==
- Bremzen, Anya von (2023). National Dish: Around the World in Search of Food, History, and the Meaning of Home. New York: Penguin Press. ISBN 978-0735223165.
- Eschelbacher, Andrew (2018). "Restorative Meals: Naturalism, Markets, and France's Regeneration 1872-85". Food & History. 16 (2). Brepols Publishers: 13–38. doi:10.1484/J.FOOD.5.118673.
- Eschelbacher, Andrew; DeWitt, Lloyd, eds. (2024). Farm to Table: Art, Food, and Identity in the Age of Impressionism. UK: Yale University Press. ISBN 978-0300273816.
- Snider, Lindsay (2001). "A Lasting Impression: French Painters Revolutionize the Art World". The History Teacher. 35 (1): 89–101. JSTOR 3054513.
- Weisberg, Gabriel (1980). The Realist Tradition: French Painting and Drawing, 1830-1900. Cleveland, Ohio: Cleveland Museum of Art. ISBN 978-0910386609.
- Wilson, Colette (2005). "Memory and the politics of forgetting: Paris, the Commune, and the 1878 Exposition Universelle". Journal of European Studies. 35 (1): 47–63. doi:10.1177/0047244105051156.
- Zola, Emil (2009). The Belly of Paris. Translated by Brian Nelson. Oxford: Oxford University Press. ISBN 978-0199555840.
