= Joshua Benoliel =

Portuguese photojournalist (1873–1932)

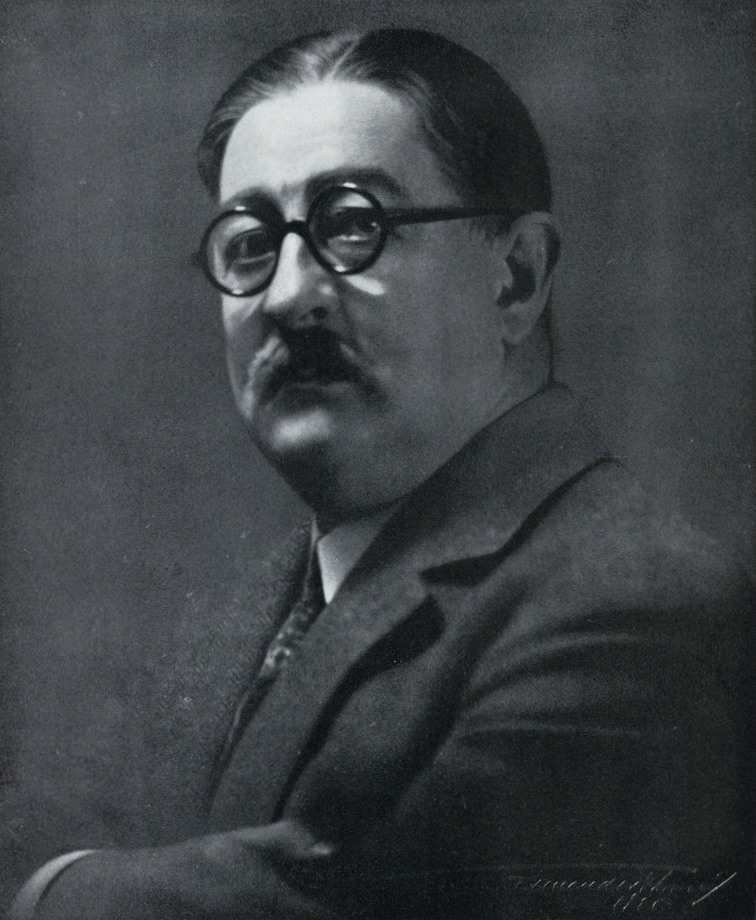
- Born: 13 January 1873; Lisbon, Portugal
- Died: 3 February 1932 (aged 59); Lisbon, Portugal
- Occupation: Photojournalism

Joshua Benoliel (13 January 1873 – 3 February 1932) was a Portuguese photojournalist. He was the official photographer for King Carlos I of Portugal.

== Biography ==
Joshua Benoliel was born in Lisbon, to Judah Benoliel, a Gibraltar-born Jewish trader, and Esther Levy.

== Career ==
He started working as a photojournalist for sports magazine Tiro e Sport, in which his first photograph was published, but most of his career was in the Portuguese newspaper O Século and its supplement Ilustração Portuguesa. He was also the Portuguese correspondent of Spanish newspaper ABC and French magazine L'Illustration. Benoliel covered the main events in Portuguese history during the early decades of the 20th century, including the downfall of monarchy and the Portuguese participation in World War I in Flanders. Until its overthrow, the Royal Family invited him to be the official photographer on their travels. However, when asked, "are you a royalist or a republican?" he replied, "I'm a photographer". He was known for his versatility, reporting on about everything, from society parties to common street scenes.

Benoliel was awarded the Military Order of Saint James of the Sword on 13 December 1921.
