= Ange-Louis Janet =

French painter

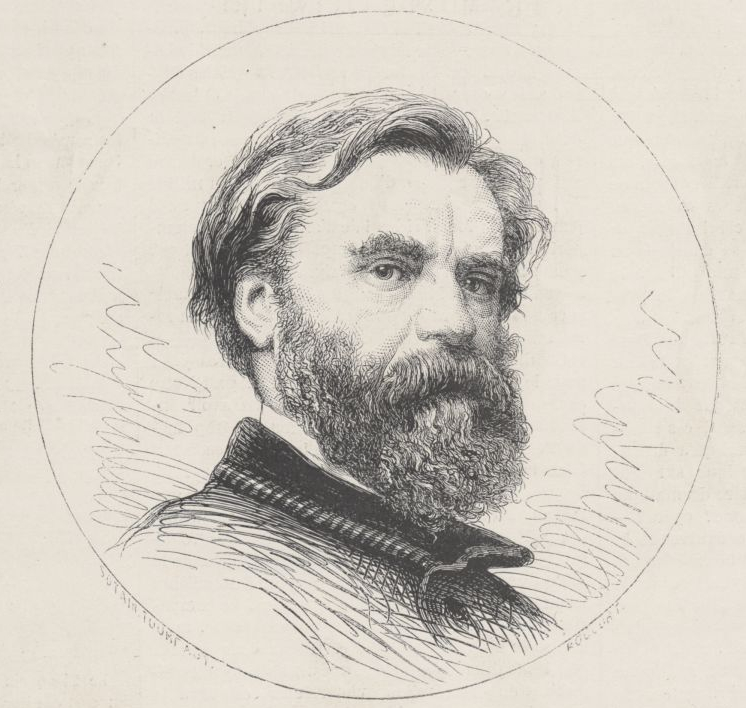
Portrait on the 7 December 1872 issue of Le Monde Illustré

Ange-Louis Janet (26 November 1815 – 22 November 1872) also known under the pseudonym Janet-Lange, was a French painter, illustrator, lithographer and engraver.

== Biography ==
Born in Paris, Janet was admitted in 1833 at the École des beaux-arts de Paris in the workshops of Ingres, Horace Vernet and Alexandre-Marie Colin. He made his debut at the Salon of 1836 and continued to participate until 1870. He painted hunting scenes, military costumes and portraits and composed paintings retracing episodes of French history, such as the Crimean War from 1853 to 1856, the Second Italian War of Independence (1859) and the Second French intervention in Mexico from 1861 to 1867.

He provided illustrations for newspapers such as L'Illustration, Le Tour du monde, the Journal amusant and the Le Journal pour rire. He also did some book illustration, including for the French edition of G. A. Henty's The Young Franc-Tireurs (1873), Librairie Hachette, Paris. Henty like the illustrations so much that he got electros from the wood blocks and used them to illustrate the story when it was serialised in Union Jack in preference to the illustrations for the English edition.

Janet died in Paris on 22 November 1872 at the age of 61.

== Bibliography ==
- David Karel, Dictionnaire des artistes de langue française en Amérique du Nord: peintres, sculpteurs, dessinateurs, graveurs, photographes, et orfèvres, Presses Université Laval, 1992, p. 413 (on line books.google.com).
