= Charles Chusseau-Flaviens =

French photojournalist (1866–1928)

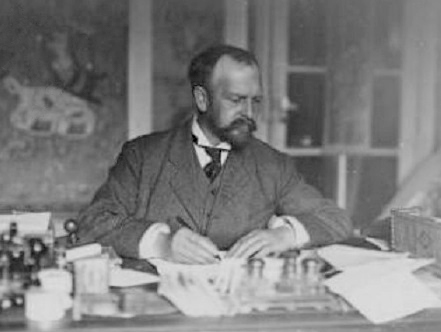
- Chusseau-Flaviens in his office in the 1890s
- Born: 13 February 1866; Les Sables-d'Olonne, France
- Died: 15 October 1928 (aged 62); Les Sables-d'Olonne, France

Charles Chusseau-Flaviens (French: [ʃaʁl ʃyso.flavjɛ̃]; 13 February 1866 – 15 October 1928) was a self-employed French photojournalist from the 1890s to the 1910s. His distribution of other photographer's work for publication created one of the first photo press agencies, based in Paris. Chusseau-Flaviens' by-line appeared on numerous photographs from all over Europe as well as from Africa, the Middle East, the Far East and North America. His subjects included formal and informal portraits of European royalty, political figures, and celebrities, as well as scenes of daily life. According to researchers, no biographical information about Chusseau-Flaviens is available.

A substantial portion of his photographic collection, represented by nearly 11,000 glass negatives, was donated by Kodak Pathé to the George Eastman House (GEH) International Museum of Photography and Film in 1974. GEH noted that Chusseau-Flaviens also acquired copies of photographs from other photographers, annotating their names on his glass negatives. They speculated that this accounts for the inclusion of photographs in his collection from various far-flung nations, such as Japan and New Zealand. According to the French Ministry of Culture, his release of the other photographer's work under the Chusseau-Flaviens name created the first photographic press agency of the 20th century.

Countries represented in the GEH photographic collection include: Algeria, Austria, Belgium, Bulgaria, Canada, Ceylon, China, Denmark, Djibouti, Egypt, England, Ethiopia, Finland, France, Germany, Gibraltar, Greece, Hungary, Italy, Japan, Majorca, Morocco, Netherlands, Norway, Palestine, Philippines, Portugal, Romania, Russia, Serbia, Spain, Sudan, Sweden, Switzerland, Tunisia, Turkey, United States and Yugoslavia. Due to the relative lack of photographs representing France, it has been speculated that a large portion of Chusseau-Flaviens' work remains undiscovered.

Journals in which Chusseau-Flaviens images appeared include Ilustraçāo Portugueza, L'Illustration, The Illustrated London News, Le Monde and The Graphic.

== Collections ==
In addition to the George Eastman House (with ca. 11 000 glass negatives), photos attributed to Chusseau-Flaviens are preserved in the Musee Nicéphore-Niépce (ca. 4 500 prints), Musée d'Orsay (22 autochromes), and the Bibliothèque Marguerite Durand (150 photographs).
