= Jacques Bouly de Lesdain =

French aristocrat, lawyer and diplomat

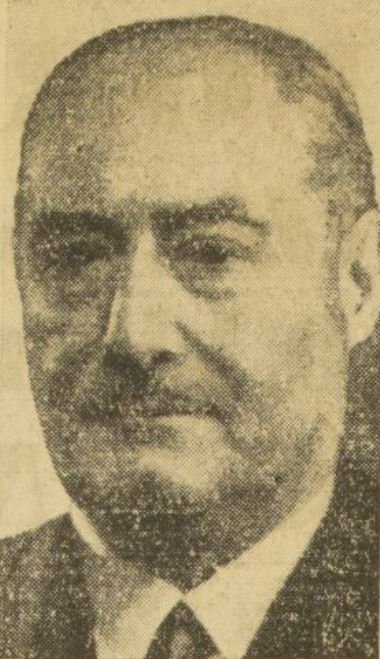
- Born: 4 October 1880; Dunkirk, France
- Died: 1975 (aged 94–95)
- Education: Sciences Po
- Occupations: Lawyer, diplomat
- Spouse: Martha Mailey

Jacques Bouly de Lesdain (4 October 1880 - 1975) was a French aristocrat, lawyer and diplomat. He was the author of several travel books about Asia and political books about Germany. He was the political editor of L'Illustration and he organised anti-Freemasonry conferences during World War II.

== Early life ==
Jacques Bouly de Lesdain was born on 4 October 1880. He graduated from Sciences Po and received a bachelor's degree in Laws. He was a count.

== Career ==
Bouly de Lesdain was a lawyer and diplomat. He was the author of books about Mongolia and Tibet, based on his travelling experiences. For example, he had led an expedition in the Gobi Desert in 1902. He also published several books about Germany, including La Seconde paix, a 1931 treatise in which he called for closer Franco-German relations under the pseudonym of "Esdalin".

By the 1930s, he joined the Dunkirk chapter of the Action Française.

Bouly de Lesdain joined L'Illustration as a contributor based in Basel, Switzerland, in 1939. During World War II, he supported Germany and met Otto Abetz several times. He complained that his antisemitic articles were turned down for publication by L'Illustration. However, he subsequently became its political editor.

Bouly de Lesdain co-organised an anti-Freemasonry conference with Jean Rivière in October 1940 at the Petit Palais. It was attended by more than a million visitors, and later shown in Rouen, Bordeaux, Lille and Nancy until the summer of 1942, when it was shown in Berlin, Germany. Meanwhile, Bouly de Lesdain organised another conference, Exposition de la France européenne, held at the Grand Palais from 31 May to 31 October 1941. By then, he openly criticised Marshal Philippe Pétain for failing to take a hard line on racial policy, and he was engaged in "active collaborationism".

In August 1944, he fled to the Sigmaringen Castle with members of the Vichy government, and he was the director of their radio communications.

== Personal life and death ==
Bouly de Lesdain married Martha Mailey, an American explorer he met in the Gobi Desert in 1902. they divorced in 1926.

He died in 1975.

== Works ==
- Bouly de Lesdain, Jacques (1903). En Mongolie (15 Juin-22 Septembre 1902). Paris: A. Challamel. OCLC 11096730.
- Bouly de Lesdain, Jacques (1908). Voyage au Thibet par la Mongolie De Pékin aux Indes. Paris: Plon-Nourrit. OCLC 894094724.
- Bouly de Lesdain, Jacques (1926). Histoire de la juridiction consulaire de Dunkerque (1700-1791). Dunkerque: Nord Maritime. OCLC 252955399.
- Bouly de Lesdain, Jacques (1931). La Seconde paix. Paris: Nouvelles éditions Argo. OCLC 492217965.
- Bouly de Lesdain, Jacques (1932). Hitler?. Bruxelles. OCLC 250600932.
- Bouly de Lesdain, Jacques (1941). Comment on reconstruit les peuples. Paris: Groupe "Collaboration". OCLC 72619382.
- Bouly de Lesdain, Jacques (1941). Notre rôle européen. Paris: Béroud. OCLC 902191681.
- Bouly de Lesdain, Jacques (1942). Le Don de soi-même. Paris. OCLC 555209026.
- Bouly de Lesdain, Jacques (1942). Notre jeunesse et l'avenir européen. Paris. OCLC 459627931.
- Bouly de Lesdain, Jacques (1942). Caravane de la France européenne : exposition du progrès agricole. Paris: Éditions M. Eilfa. OCLC 763091933.
