= Victor Gabriel Gilbert =

French painter (1847–1933)

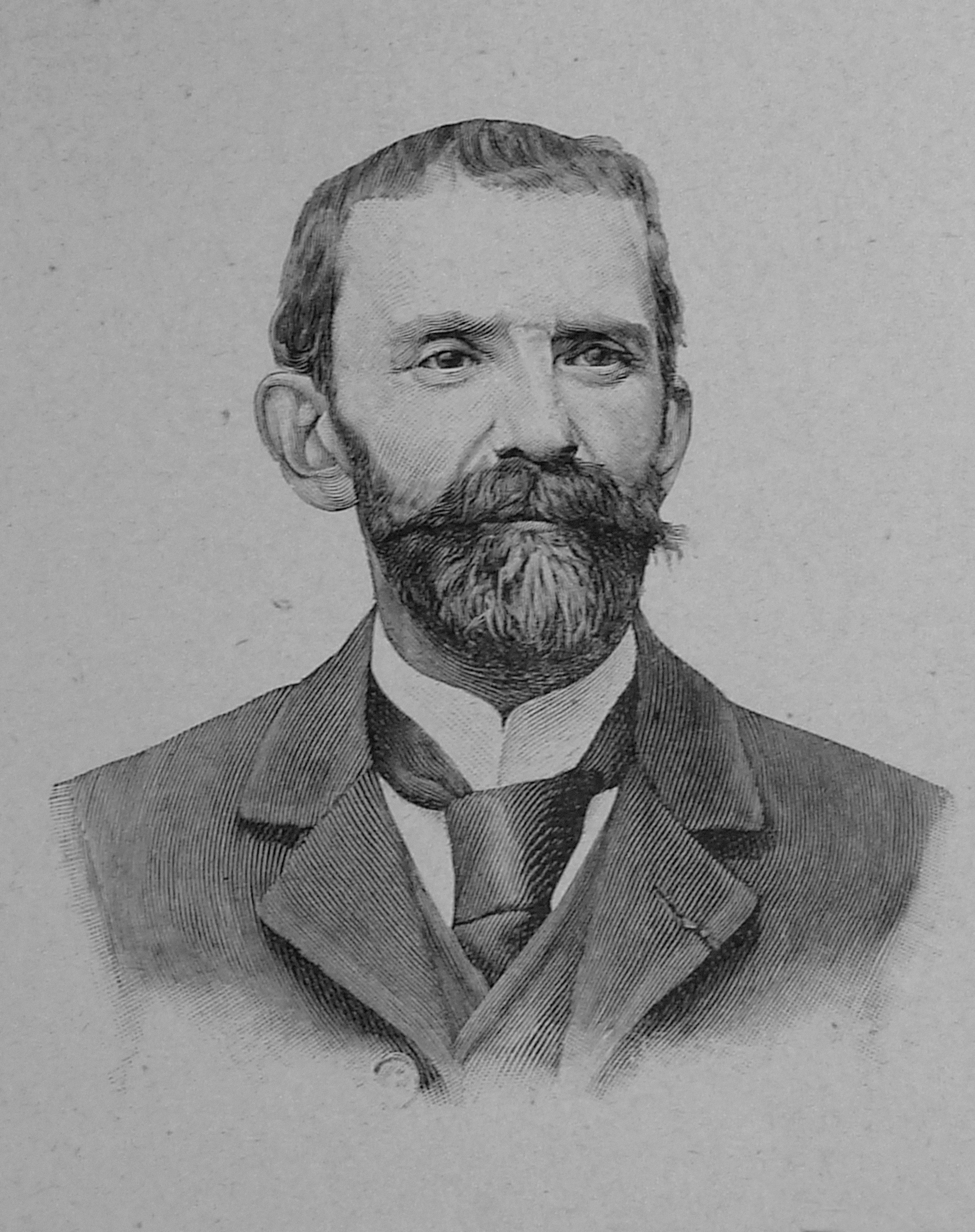
- Waterhouse portrait, 1902.
- Born: 13 February 1847; Paris, France
- Died: 21 July 1933 (aged 86); Paris, France

Victor Gabriel Gilbert (13 February 1847 – 21 July 1933) was a French painter mostly known for his Parisian scenes and portraying market scenes there. He studied with Victor Adam (1801–1866) and subsequently with Charles Busson (1822–1908). In 1889 he was awarded a silver medal in the Société des Artistes Français, and a Bonnat prize in 1926 at the end of his career.

== Expositions ==
- 1873: Salon des artistes français (represented with the paintings Avant le bal' en Les apprêts du diner)
- 1874: Salon des artistes français (Le pot au feu)
- 1875: Salon des artistes français (Portrait de Madame M.)
- 1880: Salon des artistes français;
- 1881: Salon des artistes français;
- 1883: Exposition in Munich;
- 1893: World's Columbian Exposition
- 1894: Exposition in Vienna;
- 1908: Exposition in London

== Works in museums ==
- La Halle aux poissons, le matin (1880, oil on canvas, 181 × 140 cm) in the Palais des Beaux-Arts, Lille;
- Musée Carnavalet, Paris
- Coquelicots dans un champ (attributed to Victor Gilbert, 1880, oil on panel, 26,8 × 35,2 cm) in the Philadelphia Museum of Art;
- Petit Palais, Paris
- Tentation (1892, photogravure on paper, 18 × 14 cm) in the Musée Goupil, Bordeaux;
- Le Carreau des Halles (1880, 54 × 74 cm) in the Musée Malraux - MuMa, Le Havre;
- La Demoiselle, Huile sur bois (41 × 32 cm) in the Musée d'Art et d'Histoire, Bayeux;
- Marchande de volailles lisant (oil on canvas; 46 × 56 cm) in the Strasbourg Museum of Modern and Contemporary Art;
- Musée des Beaux-Arts, Château de Dieppe, Dieppe
- Un coin des Halles (oil on canvas; 235 × 331 cm) in the Musée des Beaux-Arts, Bordeaux
- British Museum, London
- Les Halles le Matin, La Boverie, Liège
- RISD Museum, Providence, Rhode Island
- Musée des Beaux-Arts, Pau
- Hotel du Louvre

== Gallery ==
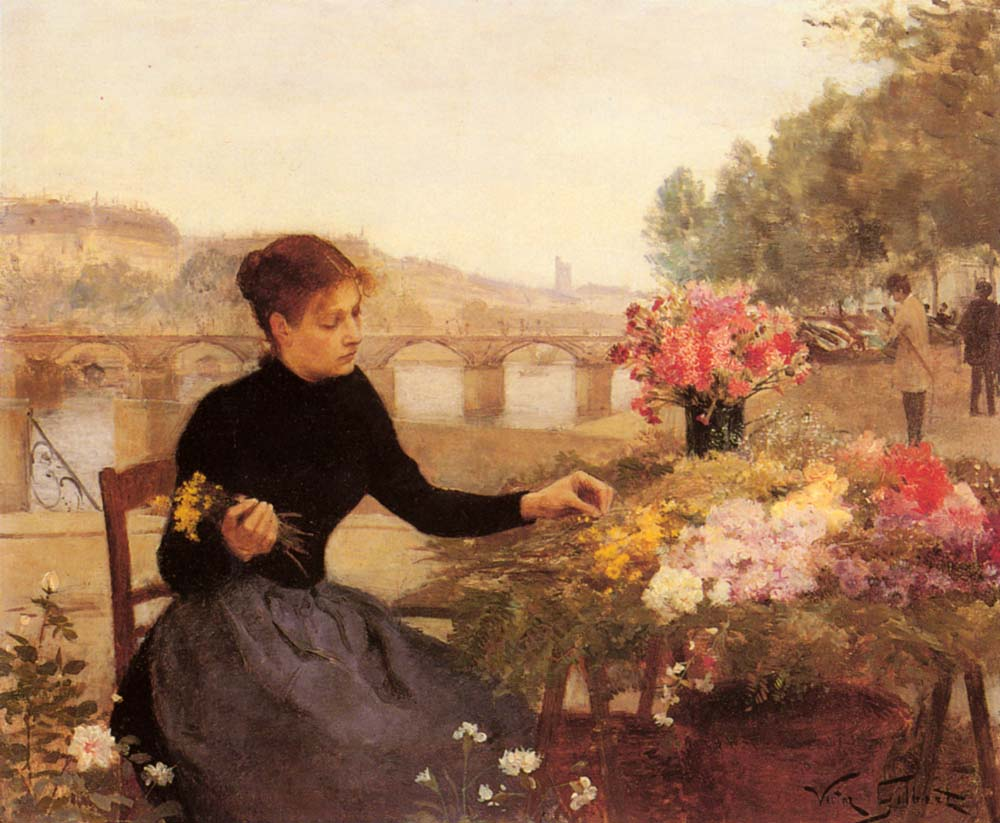
A Parisian Flower Market

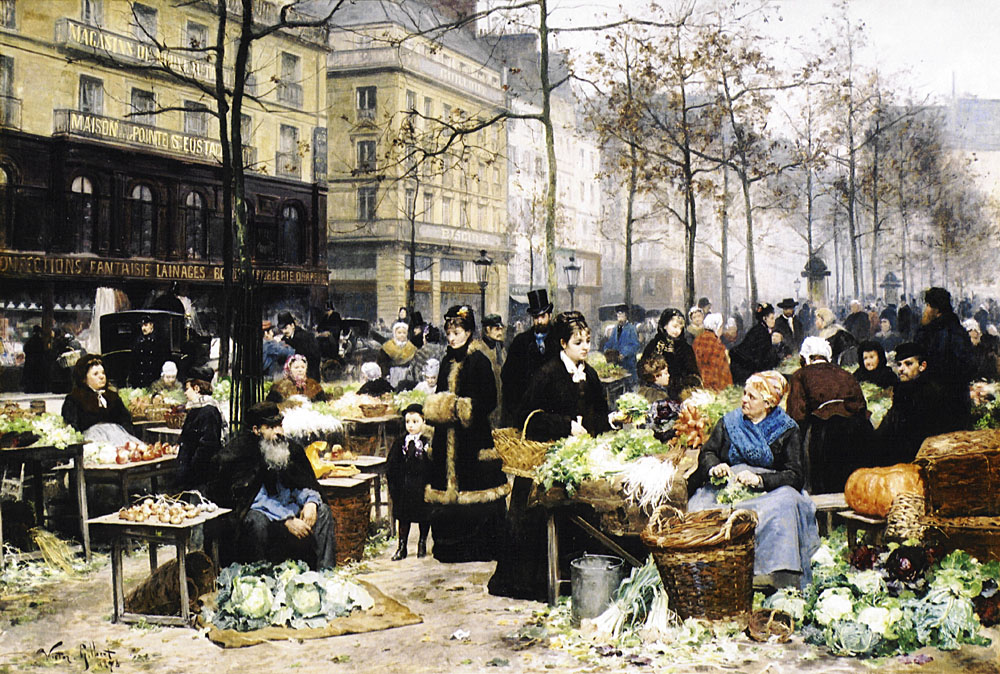
The Vegetable Market (1878)

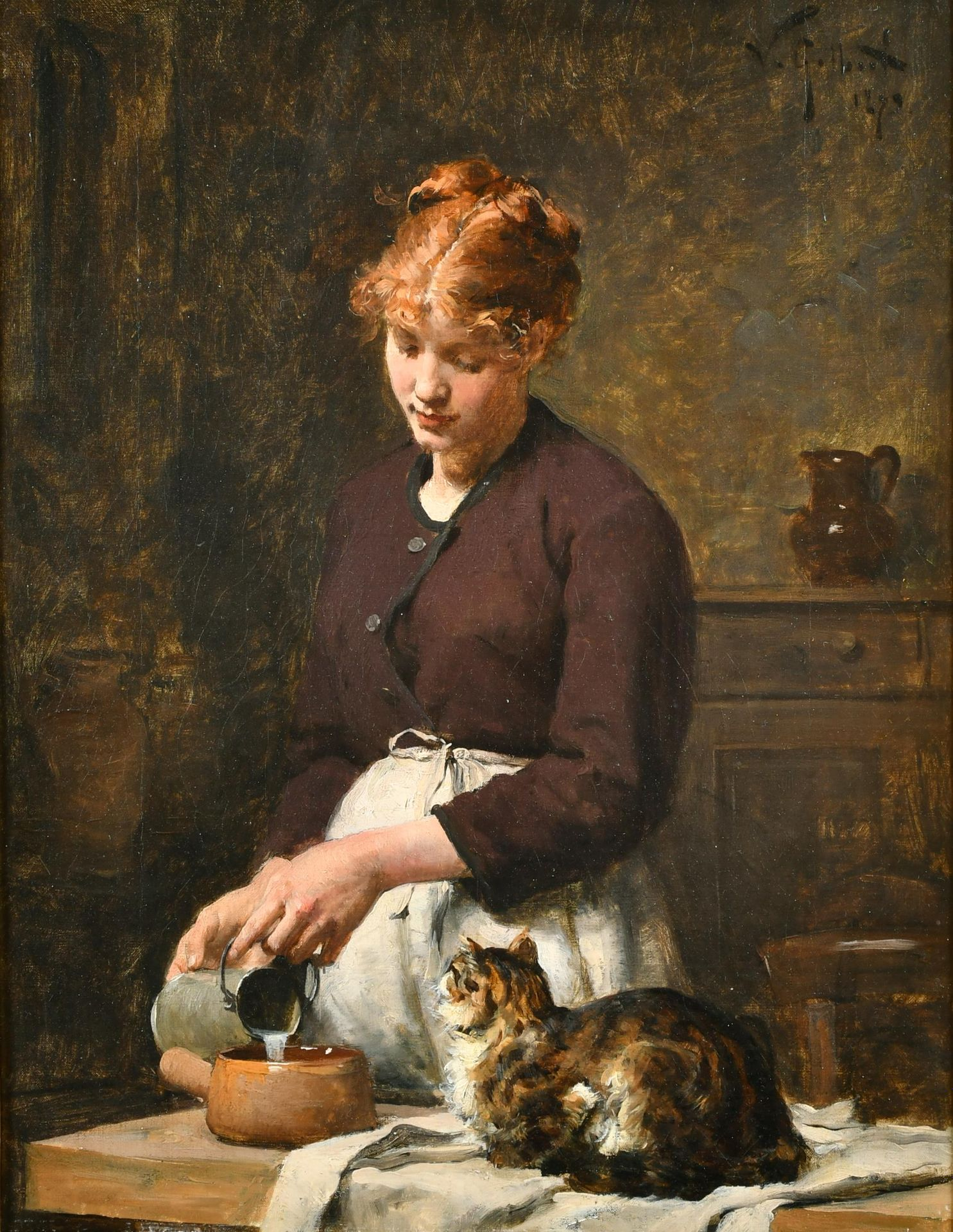
The Cat's Lunch (1879)

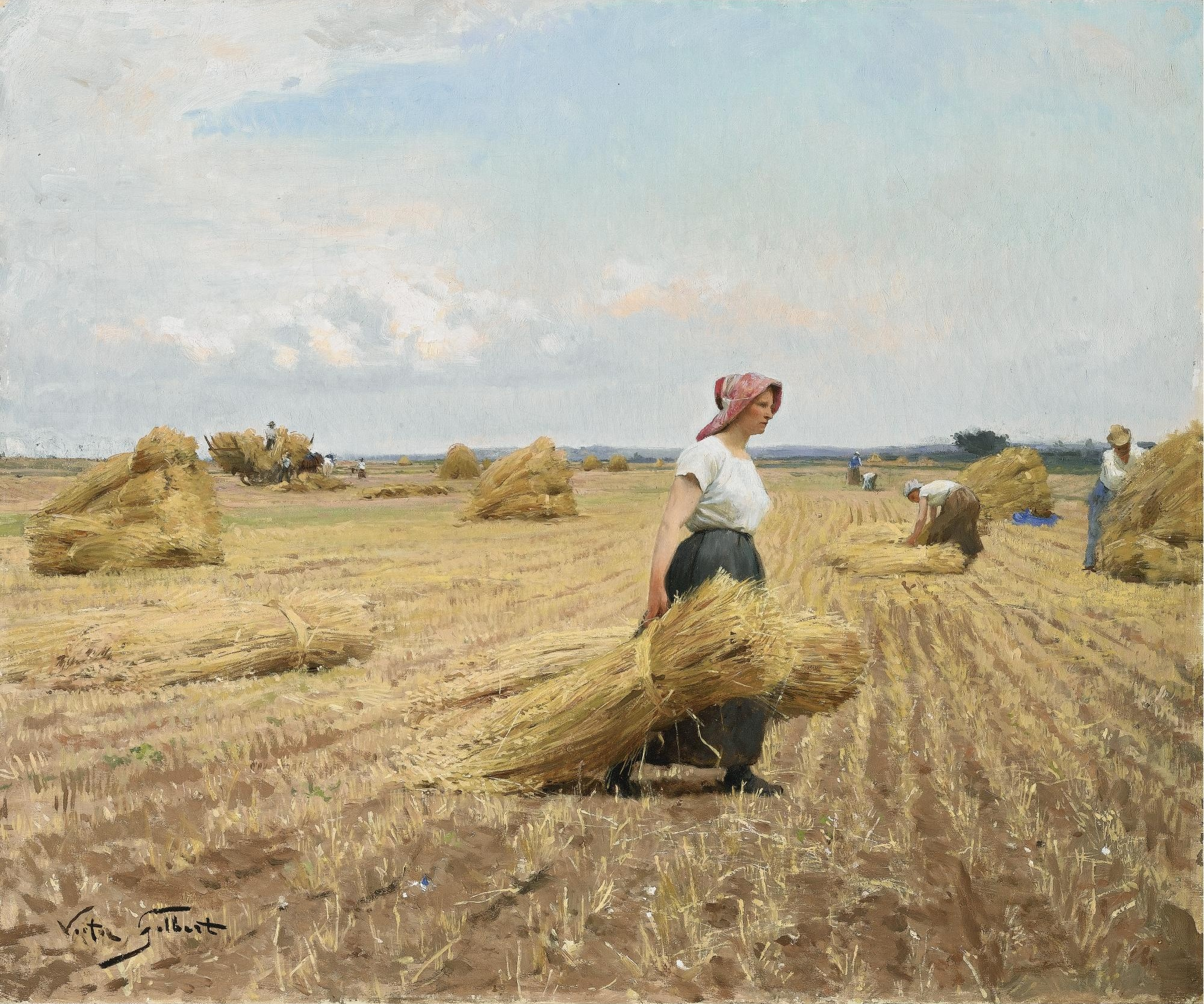
The Harvest

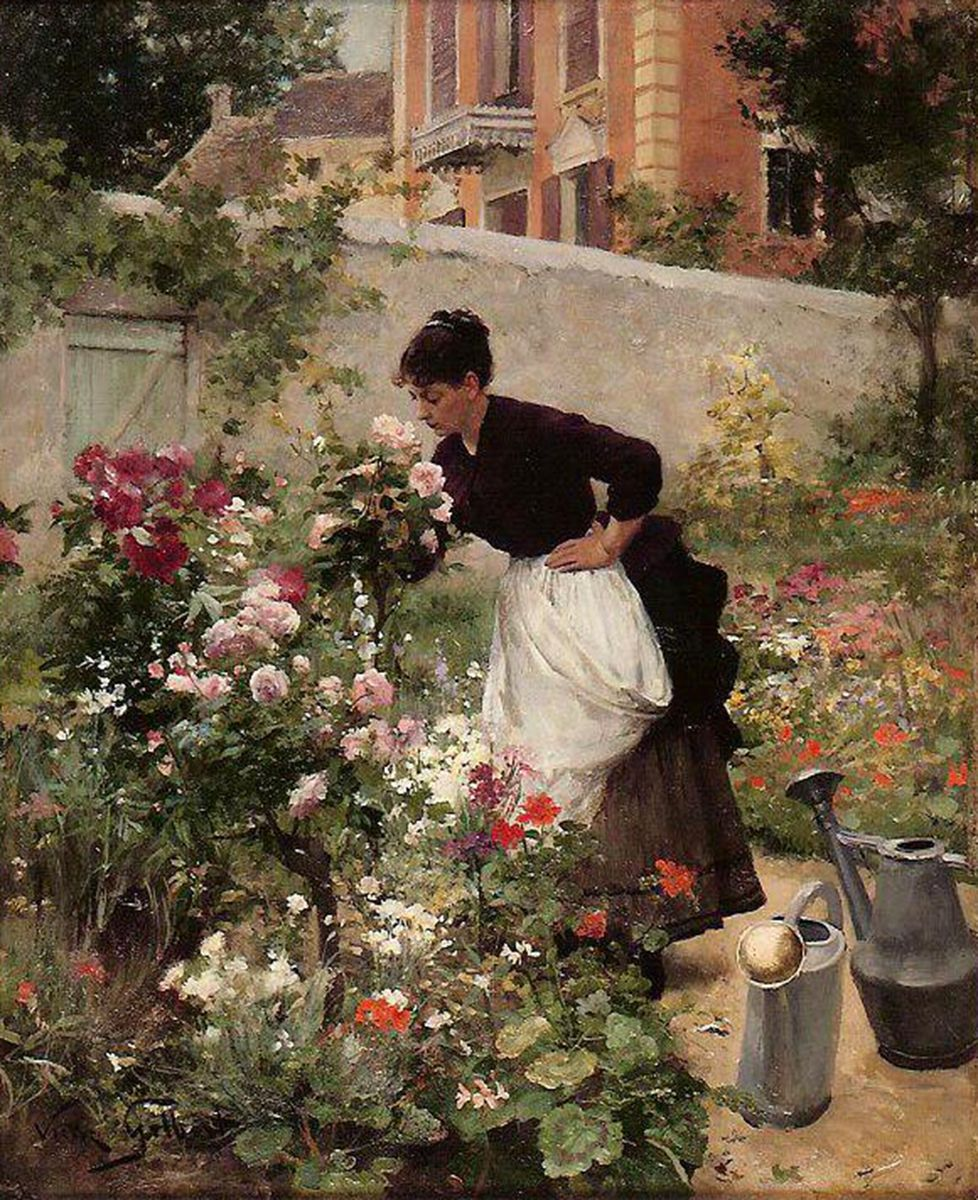
Young Woman in the Flower Garden (circa 1885)

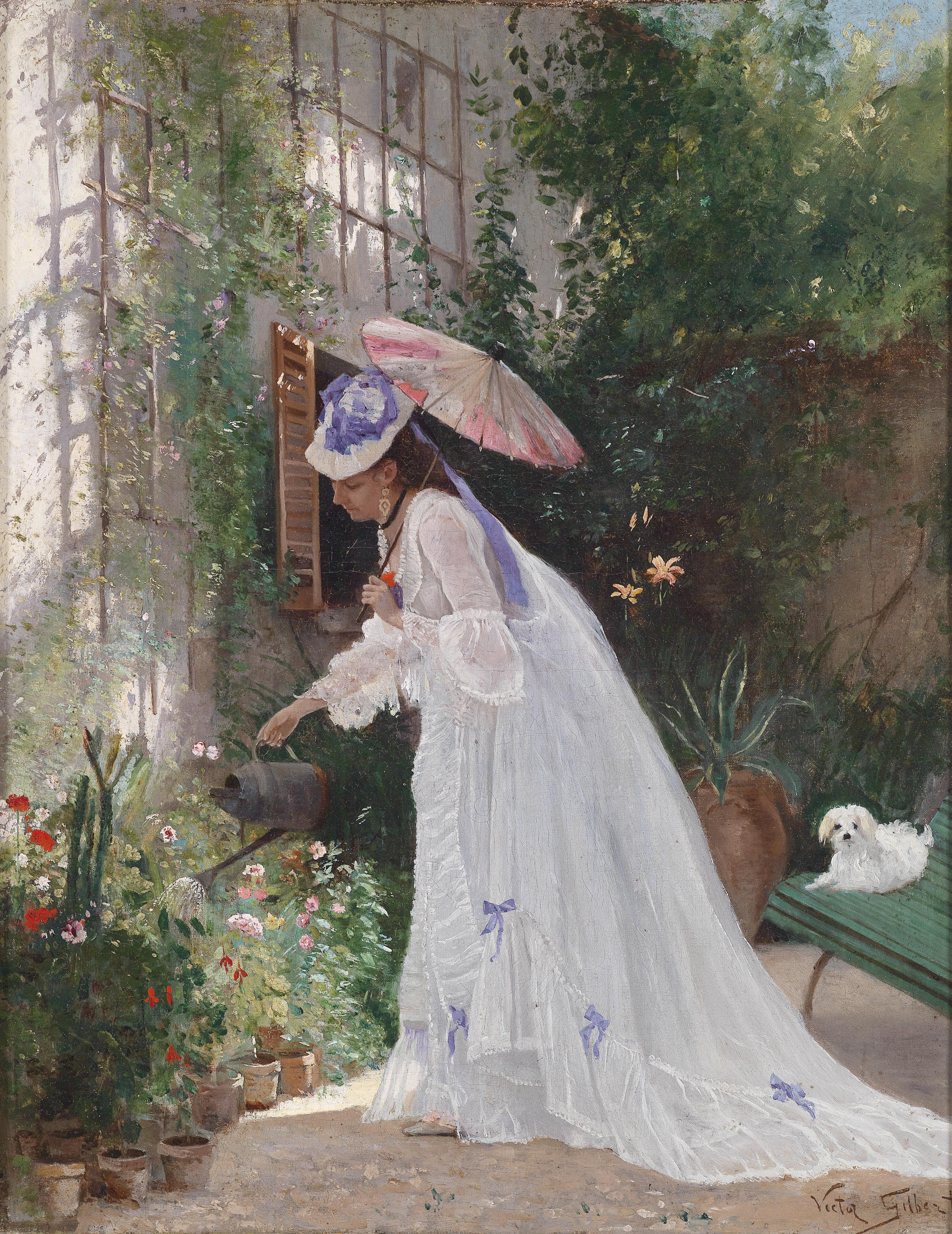
Loving Flower Care

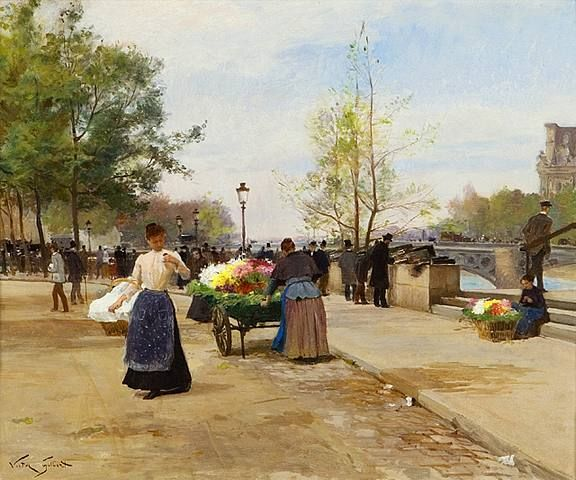
Flower Seller near the Louvre Bridge

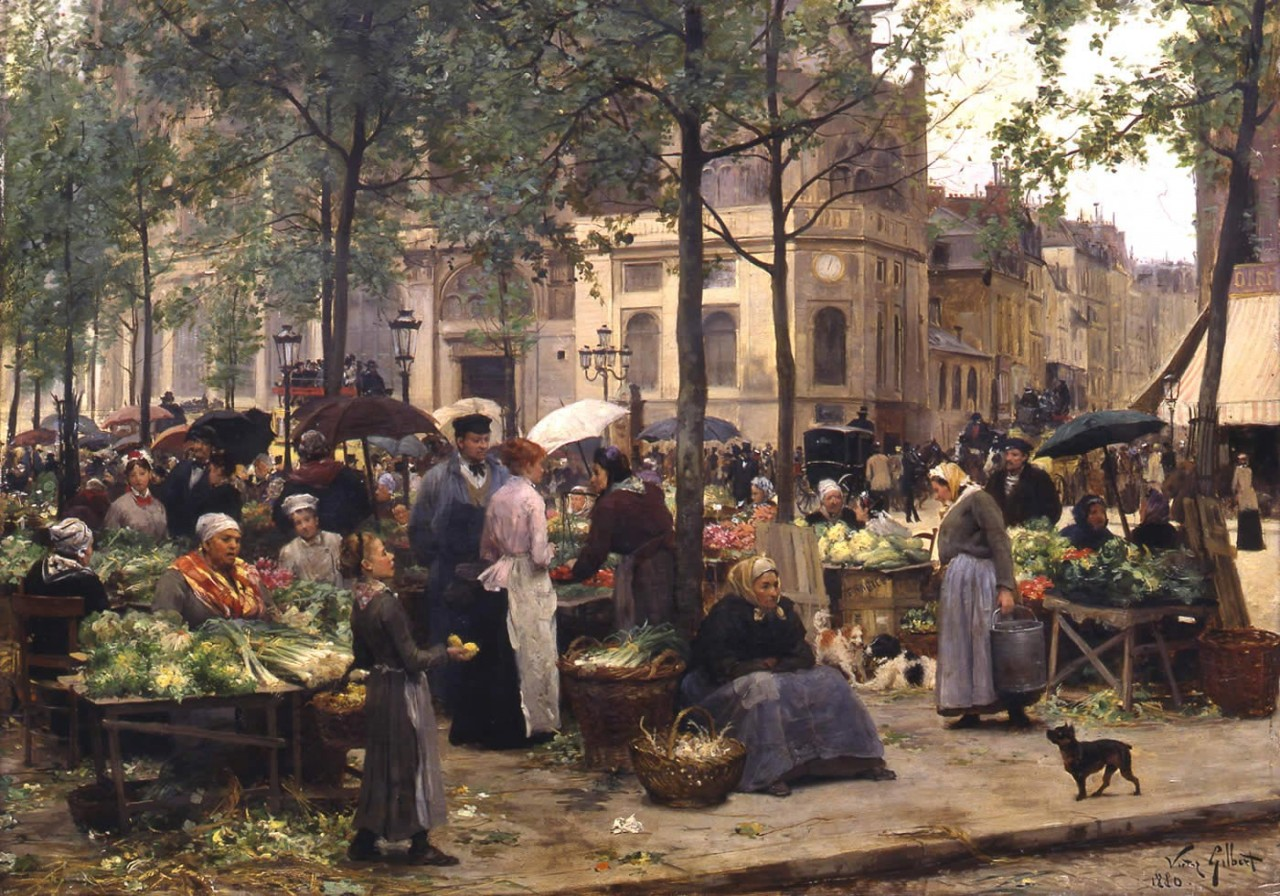
Le Carreau des Halles (1880)

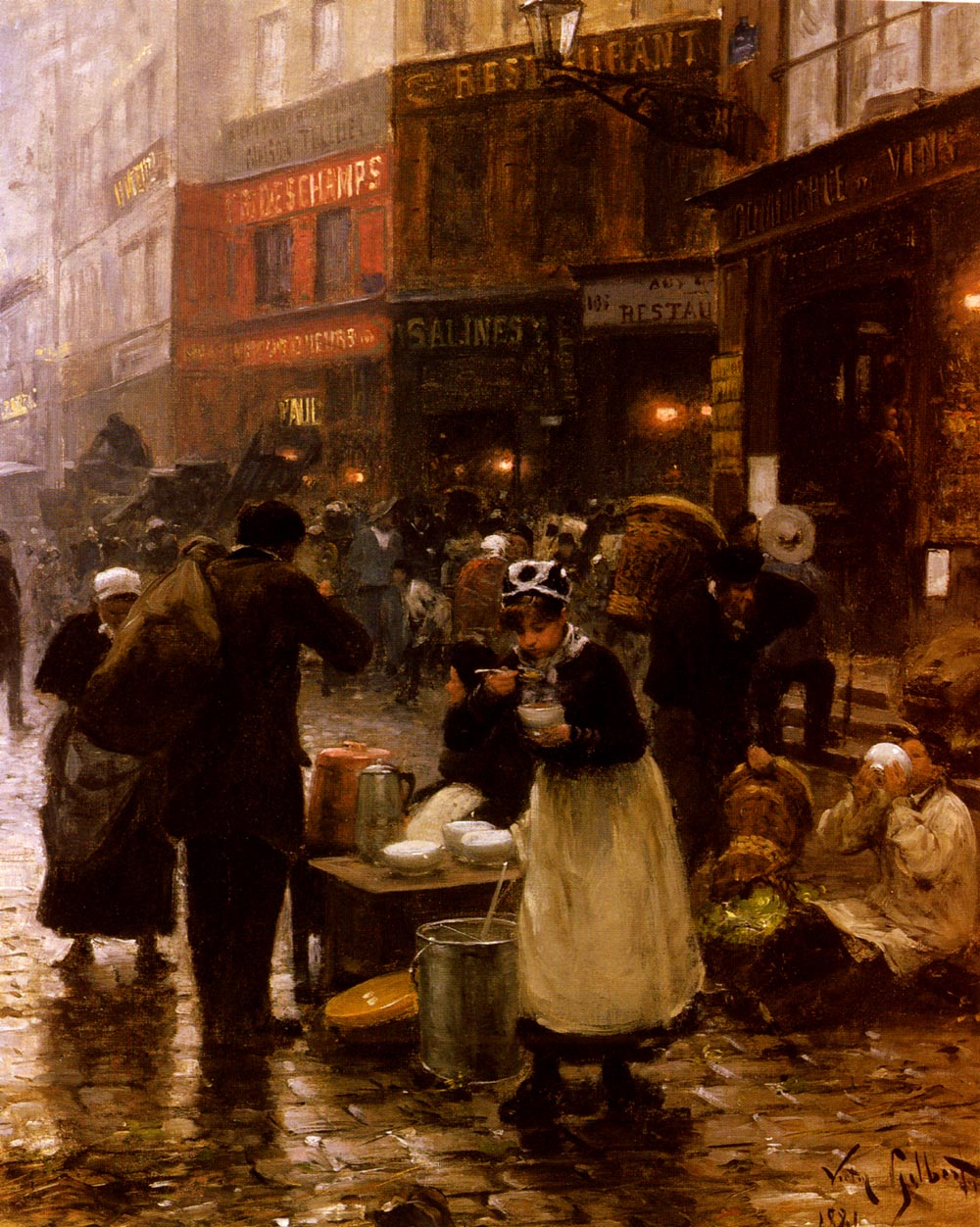
The Day of Walking (1881)

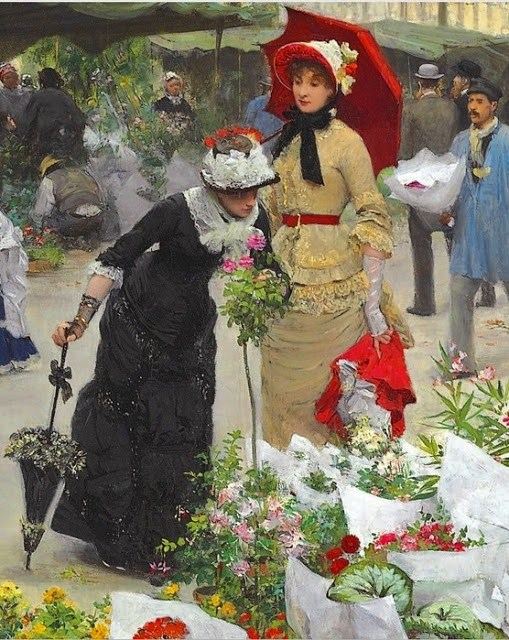
The Flower Market

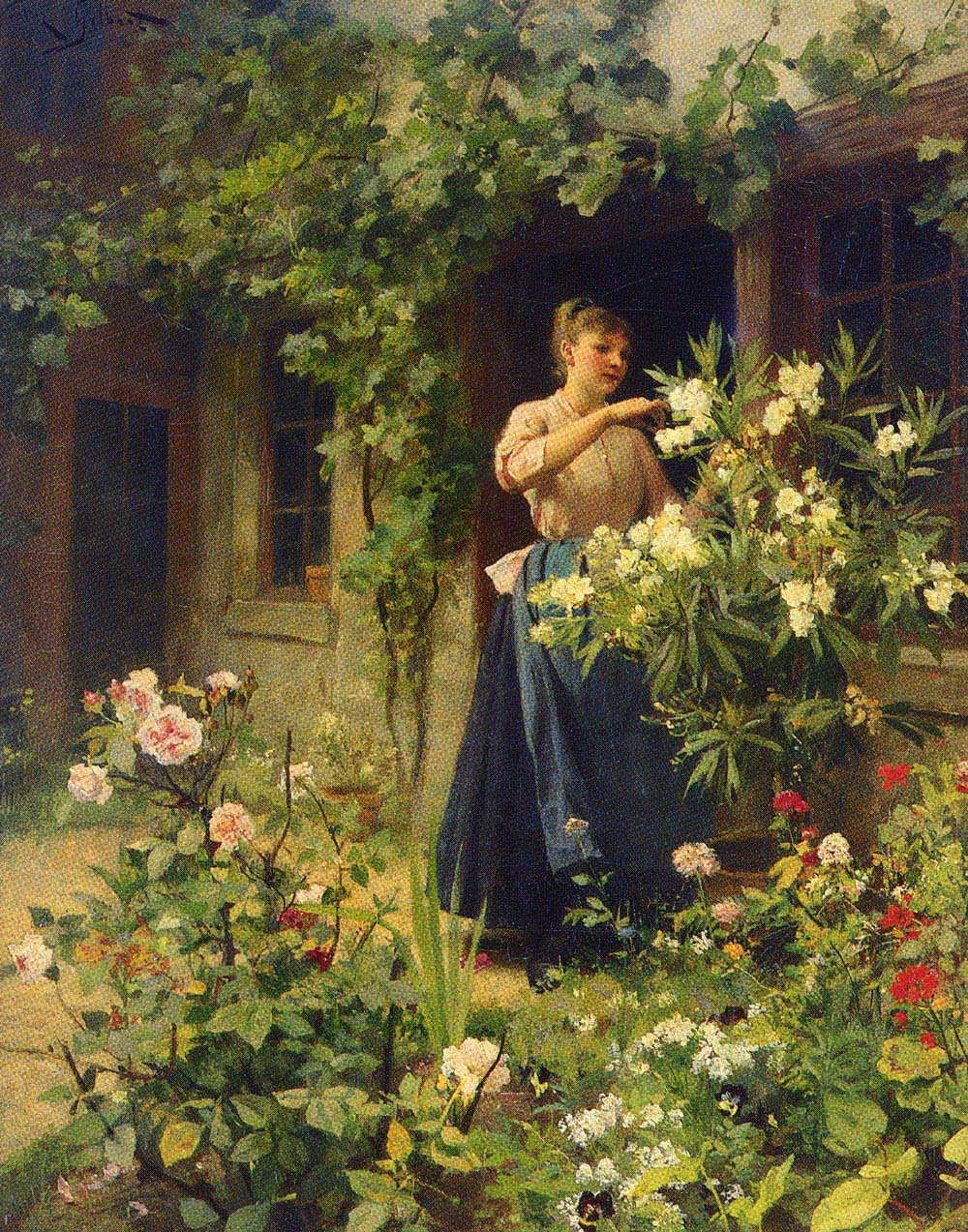
Gardening

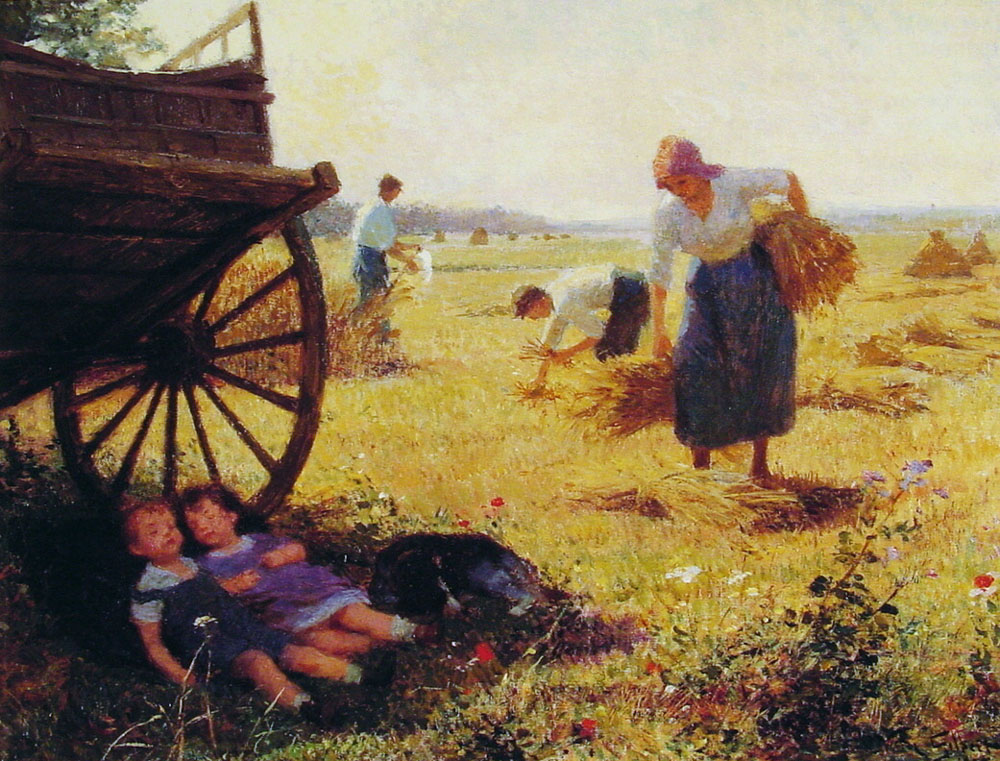
Hay Making (circa 1880)

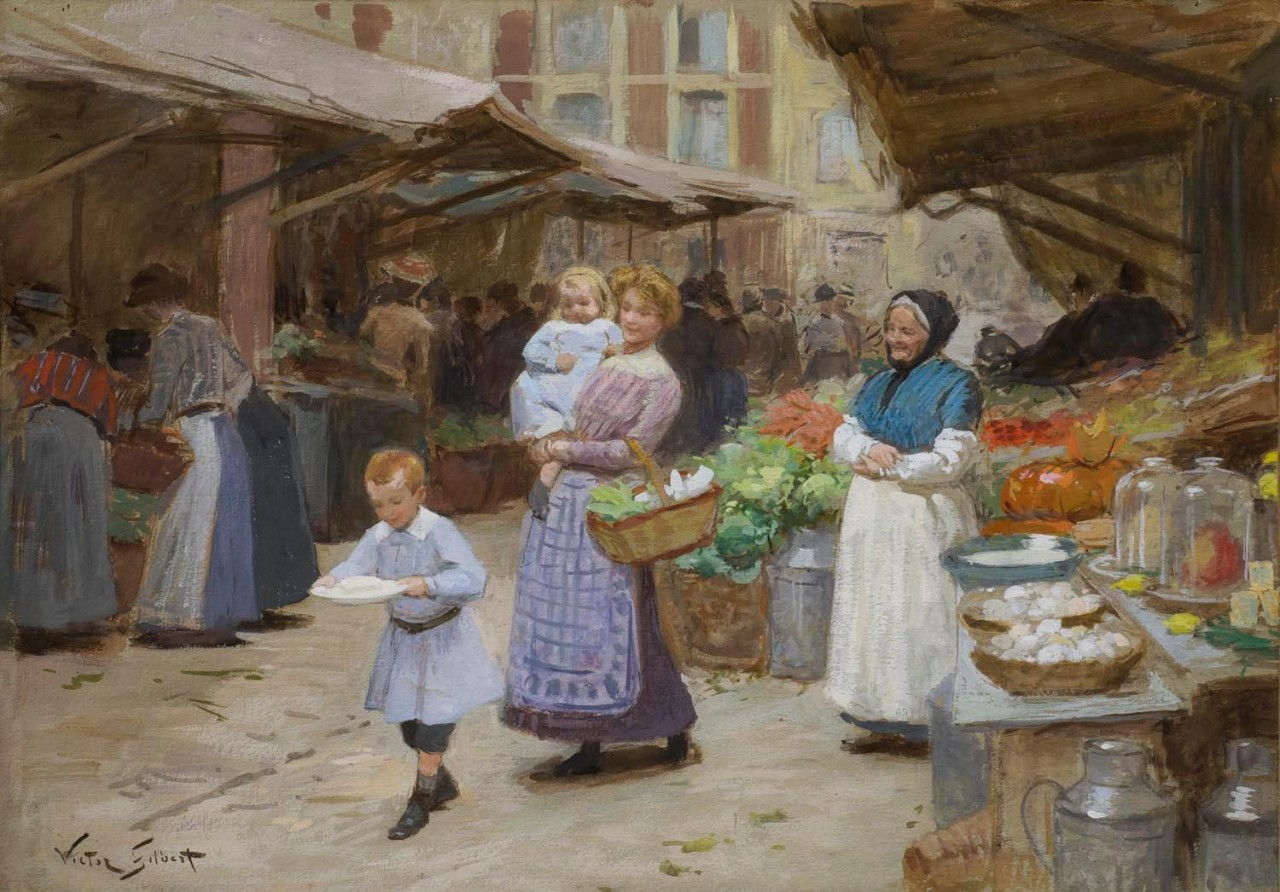
Precaution

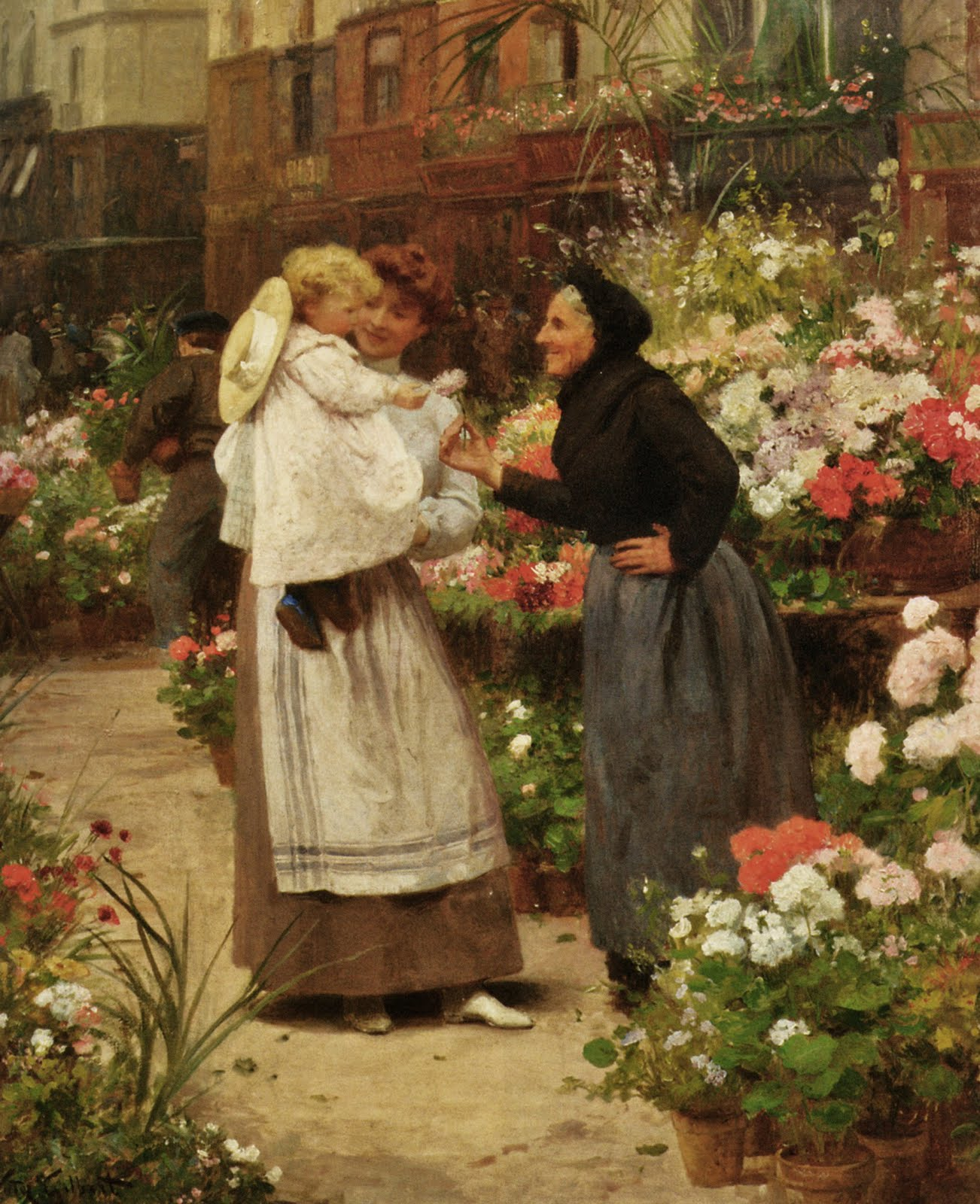
Offering a Flower to a Child

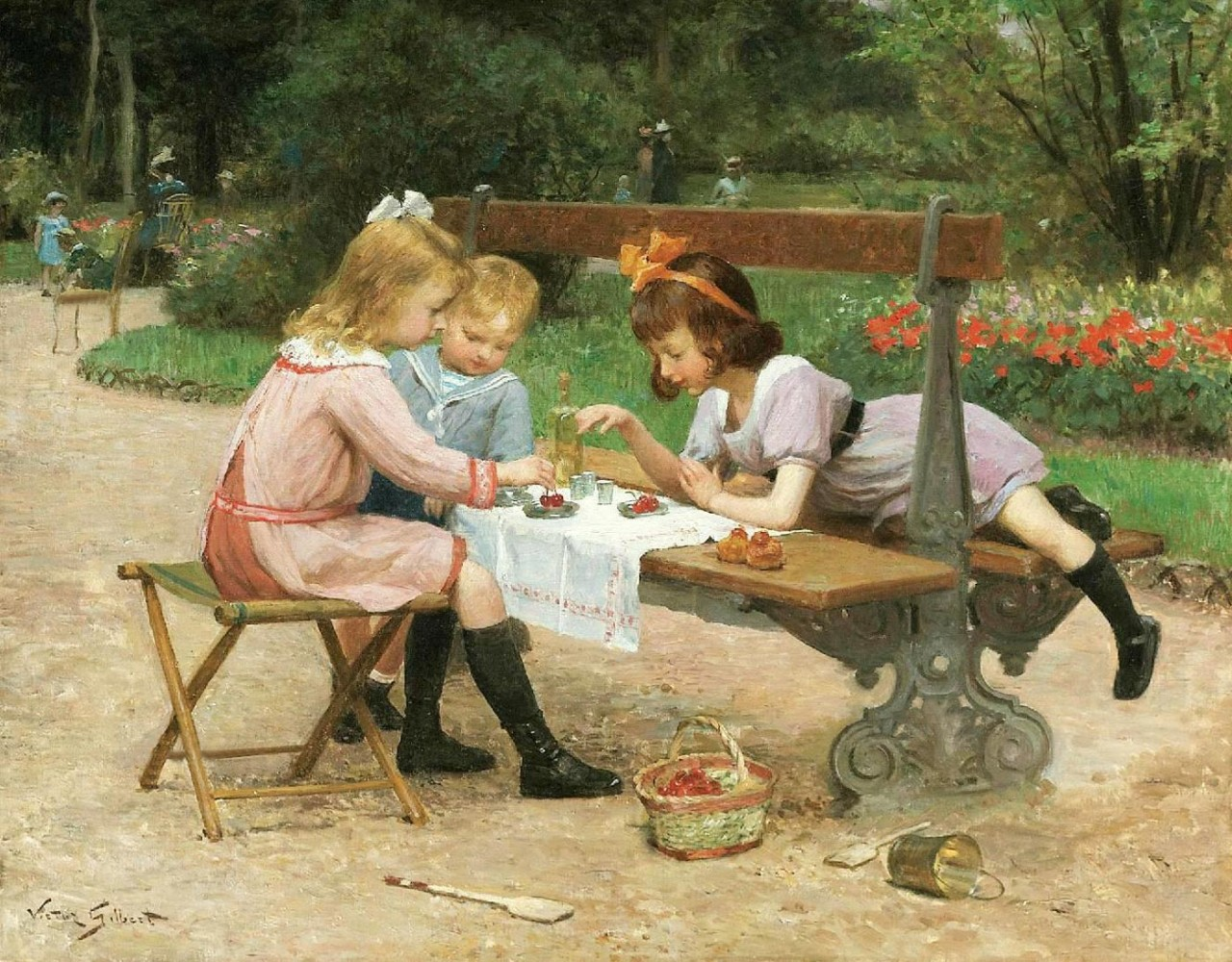
Afternoon Tea in the Public Garden

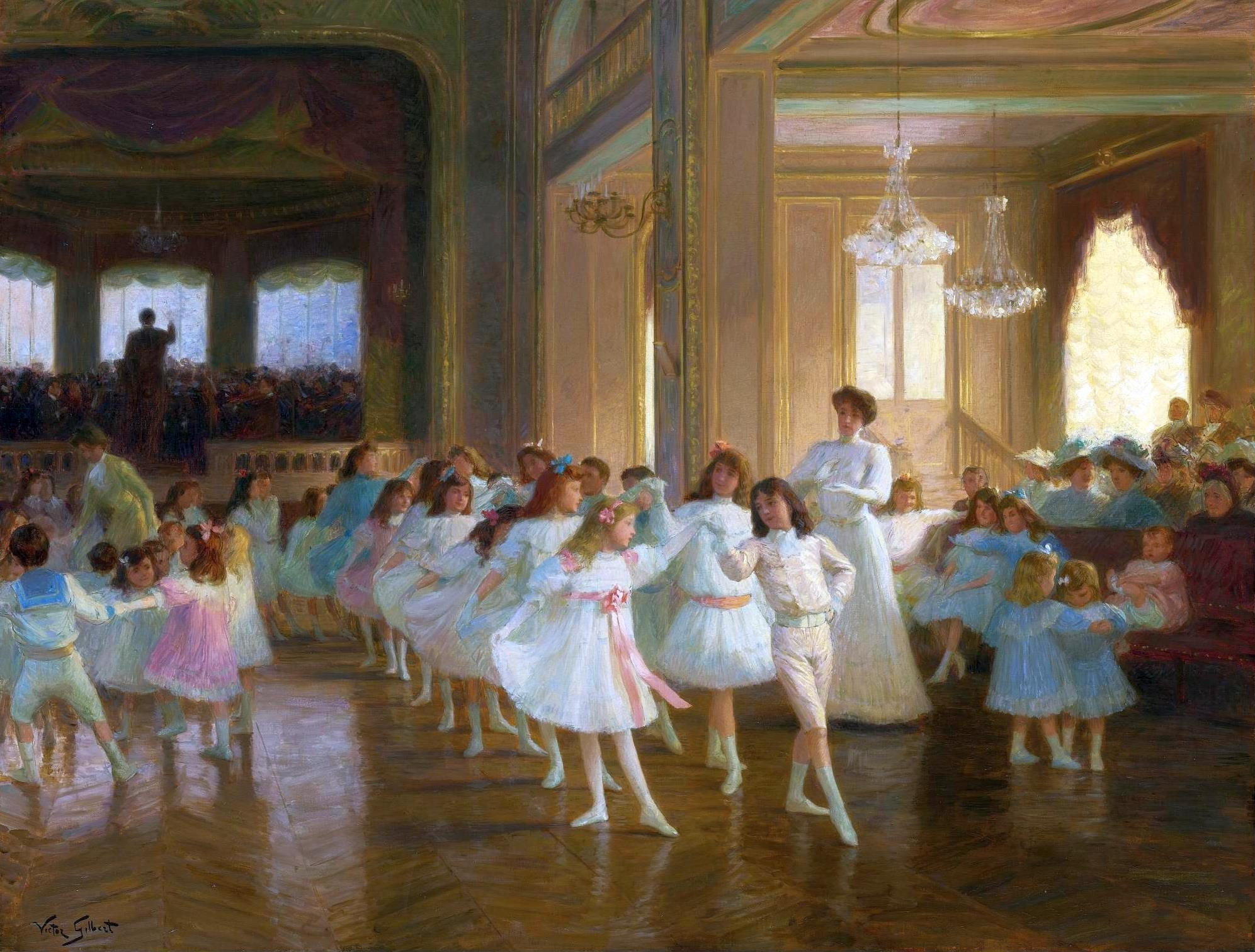
Dance Show

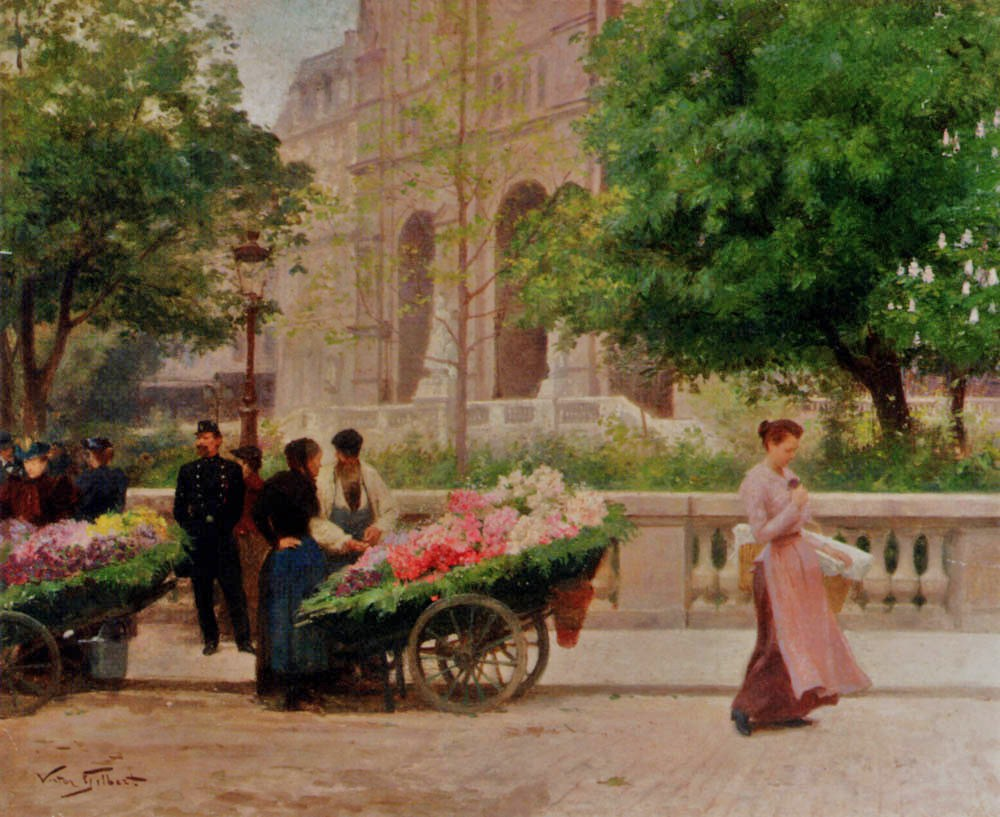
The Place of the Trinity

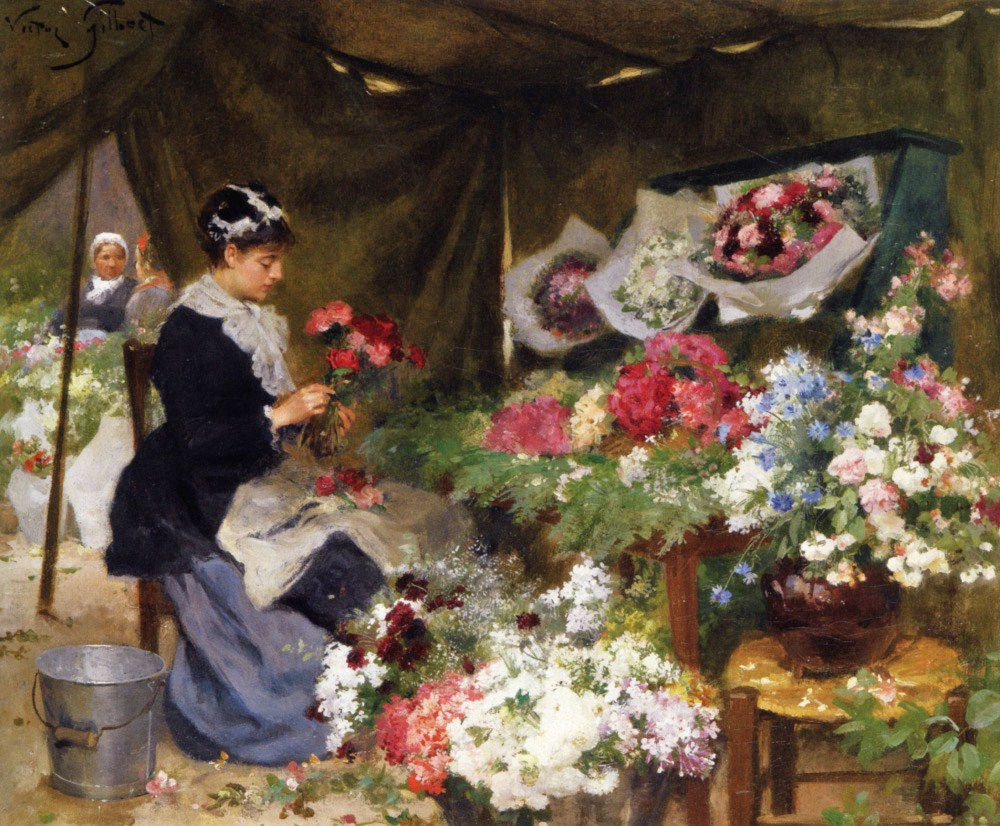
Flower Seller Making a Bouquet

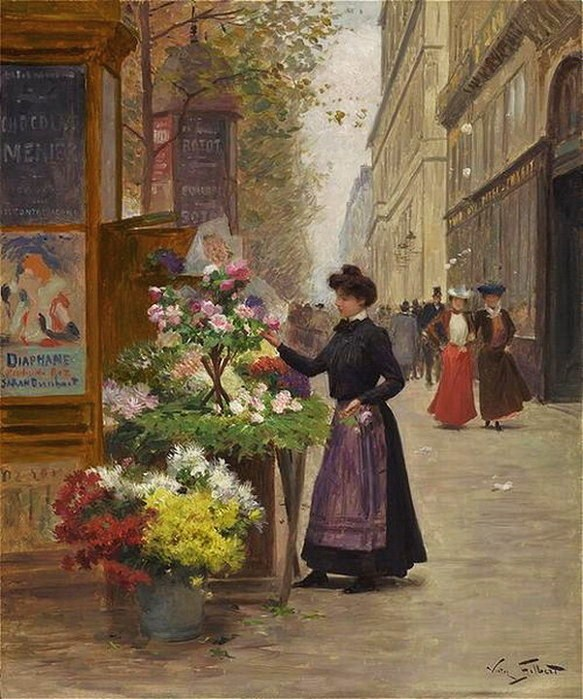
A Flower Seller

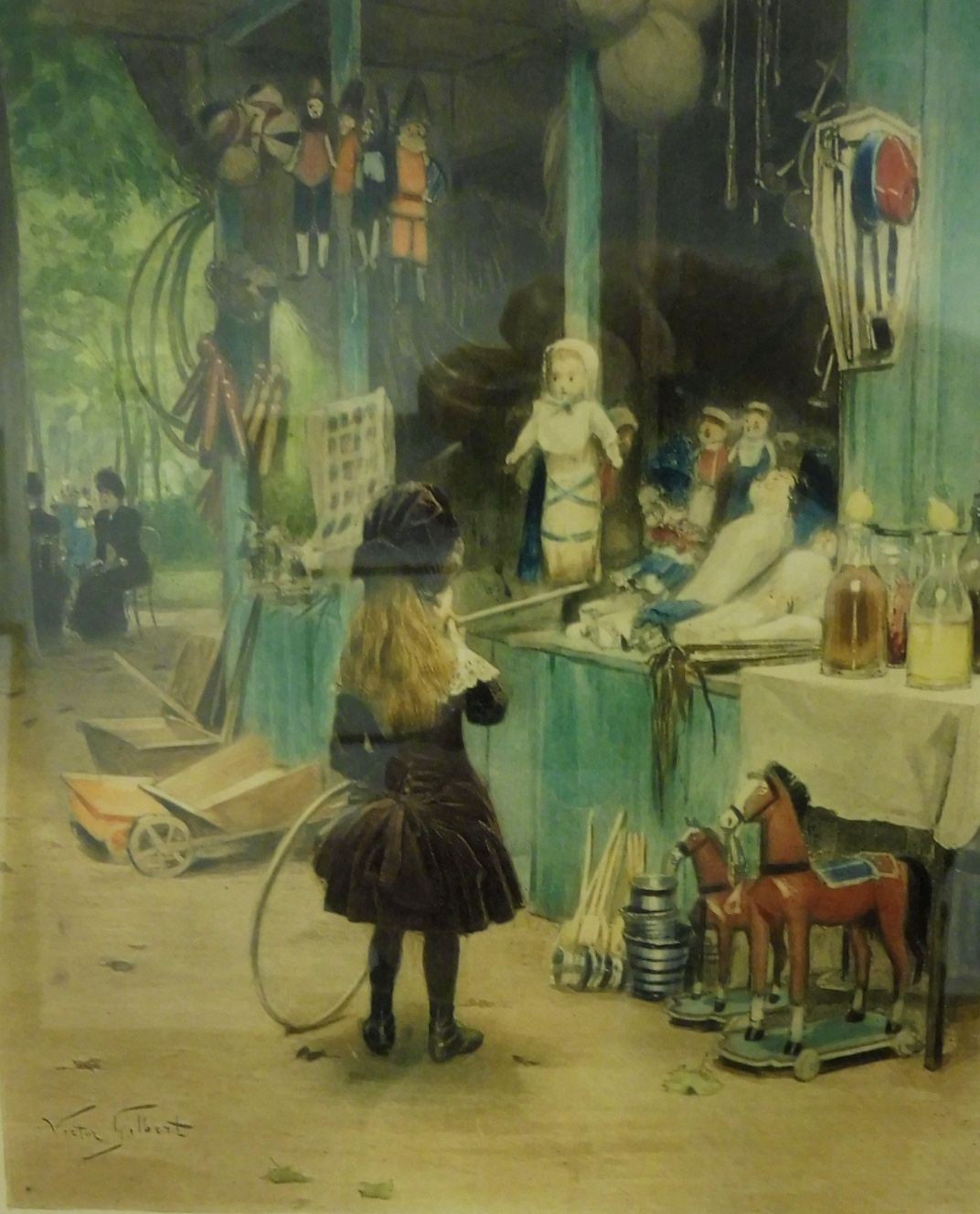
The Toy Store

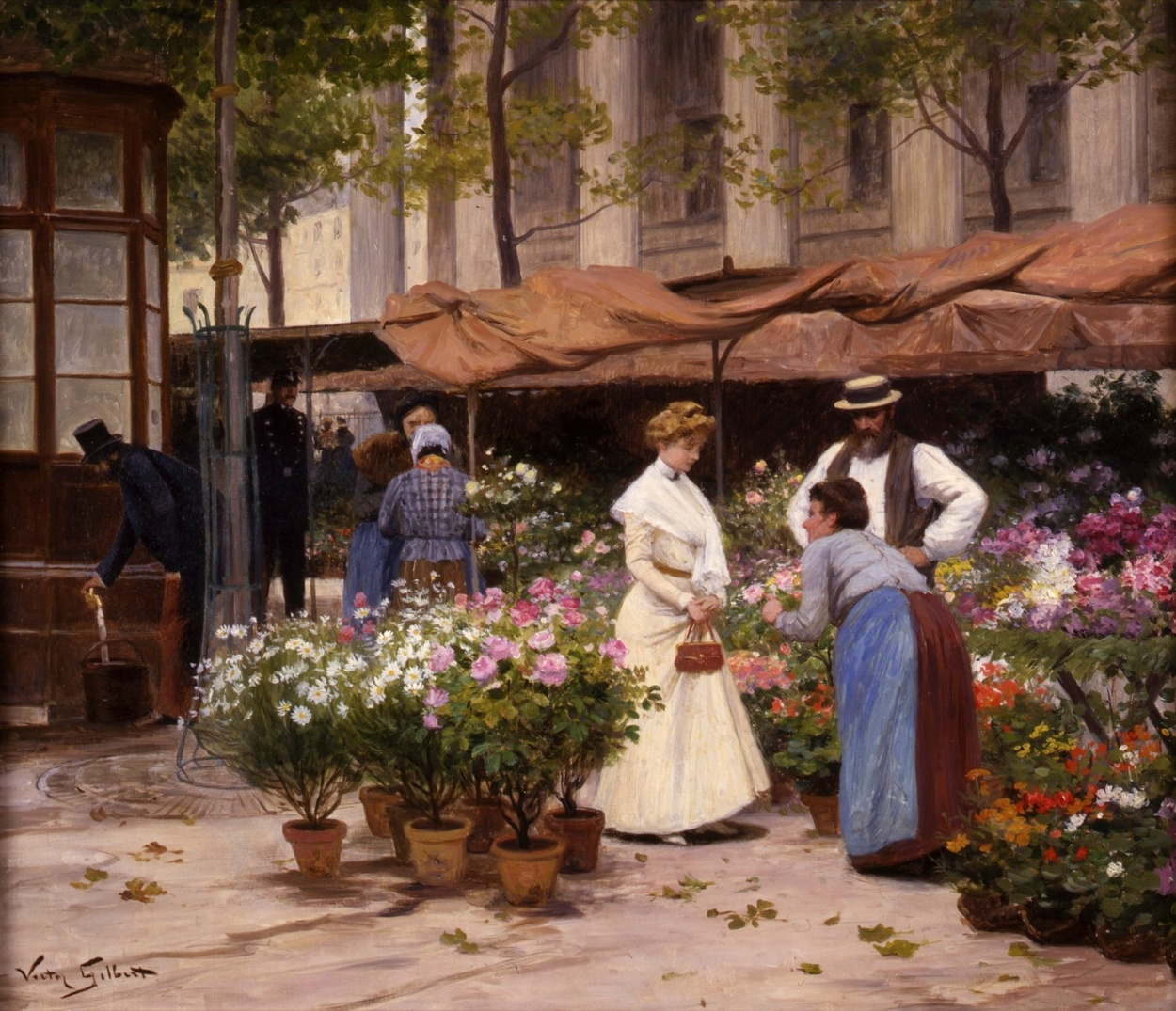
Flower Market

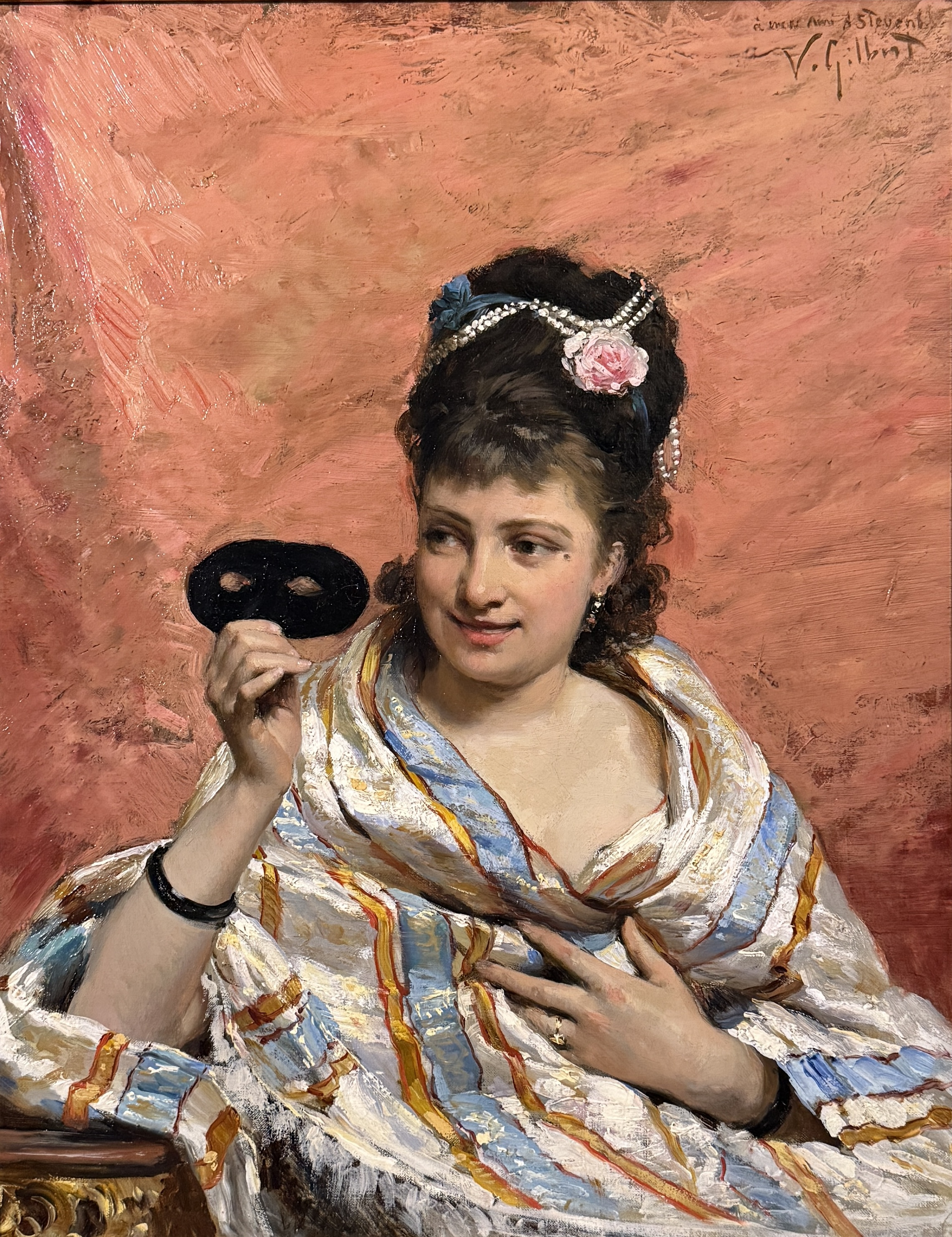
Portrait of an elegant woman with a mask

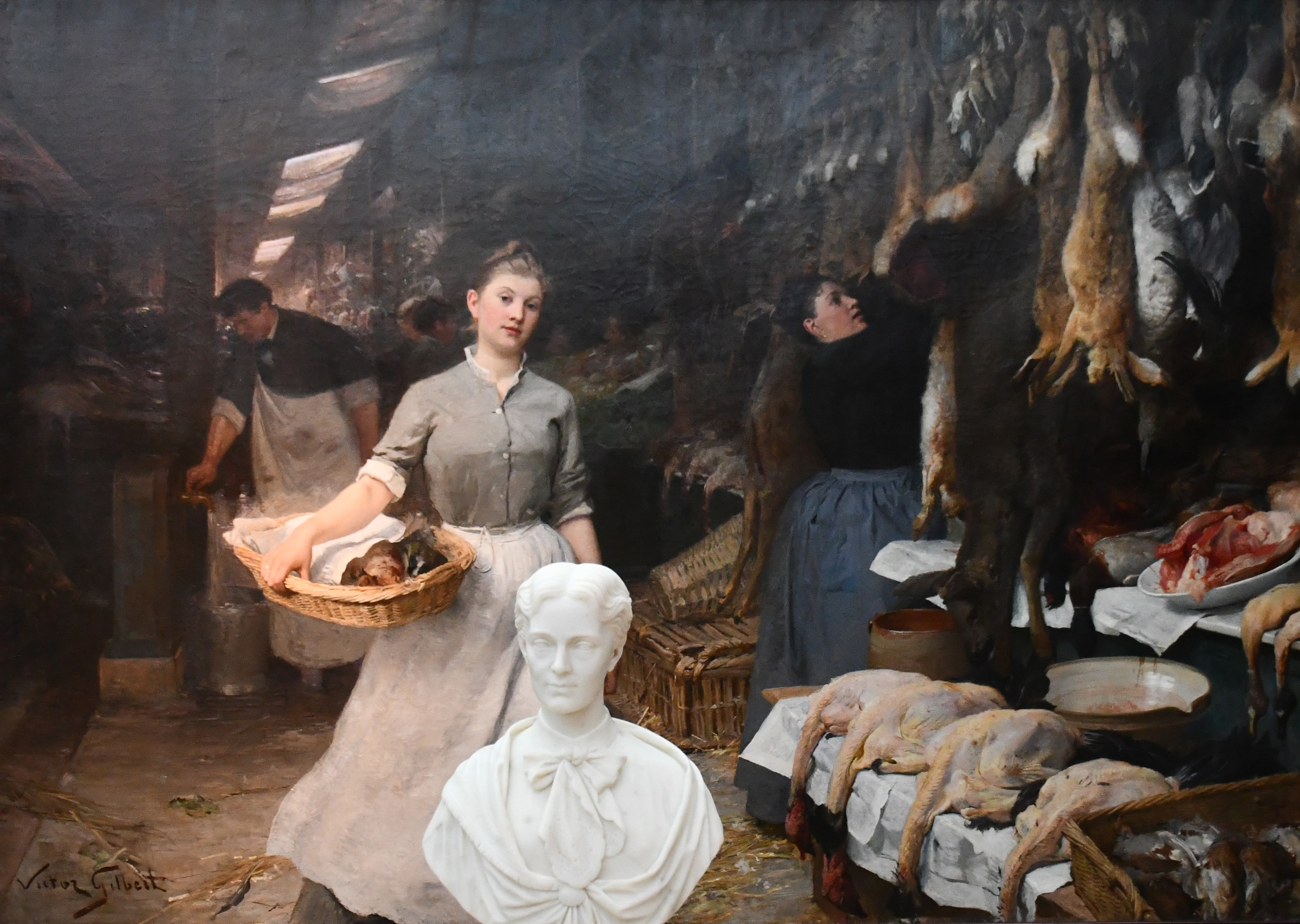
Market's Corner - Musée des Beaux-Arts - Bordeaux. In front of, a bust from John Warrington Wood
