= Albert de Meuron =

Swiss painter (1823–1897)

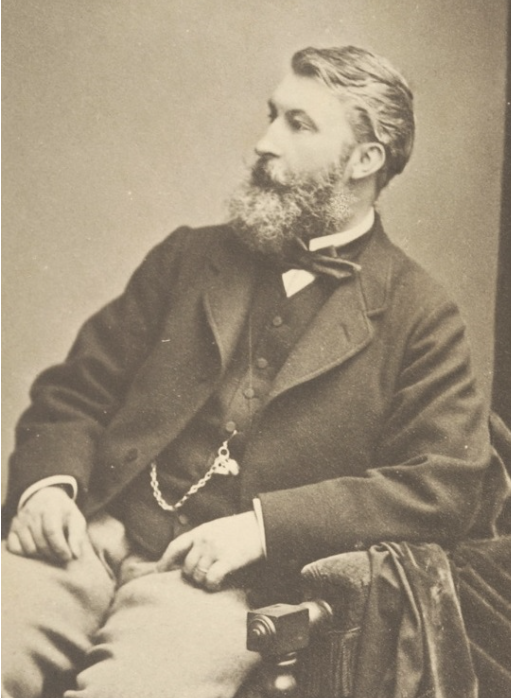
Albert de Meuron

Albert de Meuron (13 August 1823, Neuchâtel - 20 March 1897, Neuchâtel) was a Swiss landscape, genre, portrait and history painter associated with the Düsseldorf School.

== Biography ==
His first art lessons came from his father, the landscape painter Maximilien de Meuron. From 1841 to 1845, he lived in Germany and was a student at the Kunstakademie Düsseldorf, where his instructors included Hermann Stilke and Karl Ferdinand Sohn. During the summer holidays, he accompanied his father and his father's students on painting expeditions throughout Switzerland.

Upon the recommendation of Léon Berthoud (1822–1892), a local landscape painter, he went to Paris, where he became one of the first Swiss artists to work in the studios of Charles Gleyre. In 1846, he enrolled at the École des Beaux-arts. His first exhibition at the Salon came in 1848, just before the Revolution. Shortly after, he returned home and settled in the Berner Oberland. There, he spent some summers with the brothers Edouard and Karl Girardet as well as Benjamin Vautier. He made regular trips to Paris to visit with his friends there. In 1860, he spent time painting with Gustave-Henri Colin in the Pyrenees.

In 1866, he married Julie Perrot, the daughter of Louis Perrot, who belonged to a family of distinguished botanists. This was followed by a honeymoon in Italy before they settled in Corcelles-près-Concise; his father's hometown. The following year, he was named Chairman of the "Société des amis des arts de Neuchâtel". In 1878, he represented Switzerland and sat on the jury at the Exposition Universelle. From 1888 to 1892, he was a member of the Eidgenössische Kunstkommission (Federal Arts Commission).

== Selected paintings ==
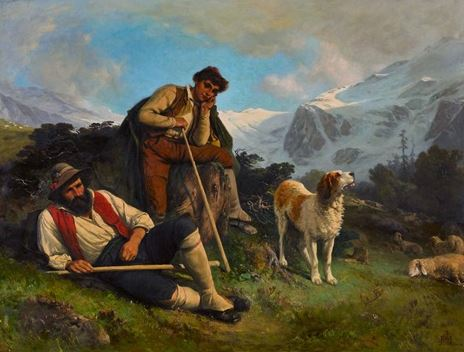
Shepherds Resting at Piz Bernina

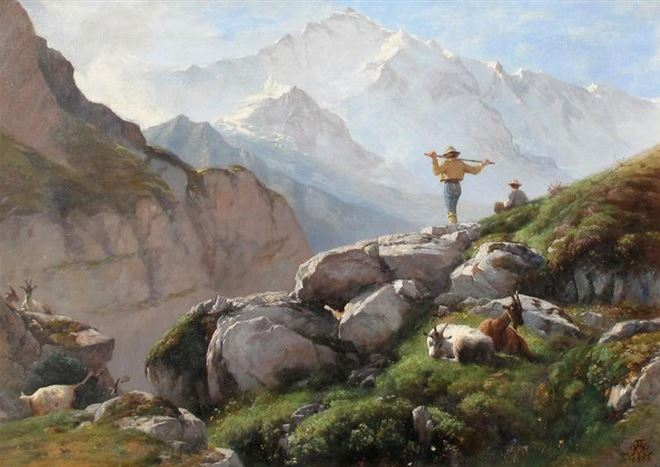
Alpine Landscape with Hikers

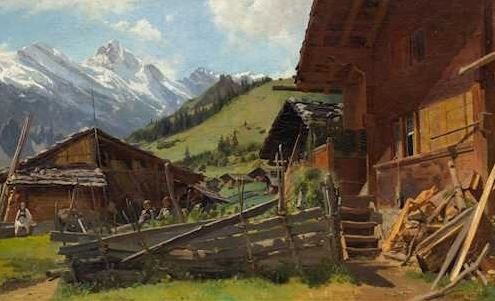
Chalets

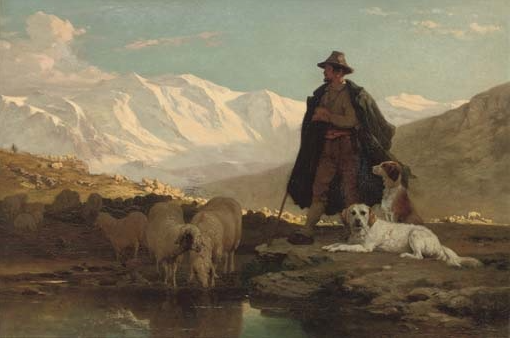
Alpine Landscape with Shepherd
