= Jakob Fürchtegott Dielmann =

German painter (1809–1885)

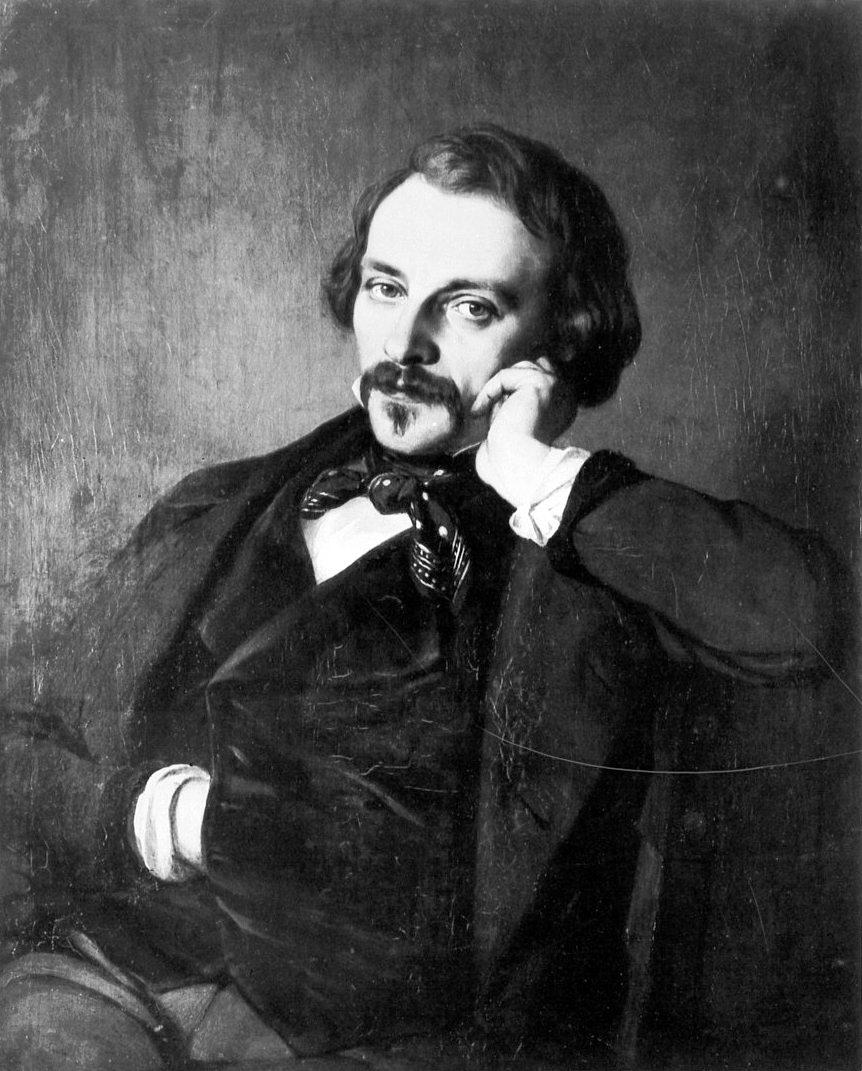
Jakob Fürchtegott Dielmann, c. 1845, by Karl Bennert (1815–1885)

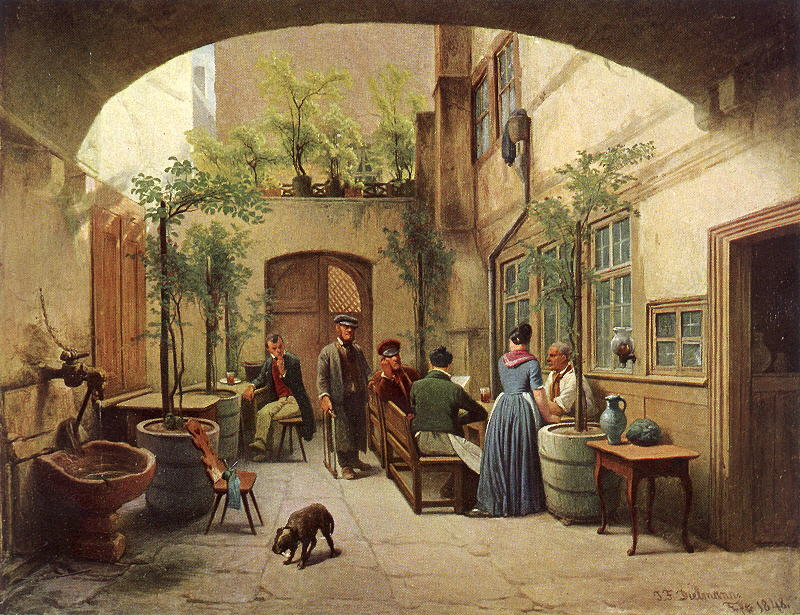
The Brewery in the Gelnhäuser Alley, Frankfurt (1848)

Jakob Fürchtegott Dielmann (9 September 1809 – 30 May 1885) was a German illustrator, genre and landscape painter. He was also one of the co-founders of the Artists' Colony at Kronberg.

== Life ==
He was born in Frankfurt as the son of a gardener. His initial artistic training was in lithography at the J. C. Vogelschen Lithographieanstalt in Frankfurt. From 1825 to 1827, he studied with Carl Friedrich Wendelstadt at the Städelschule. In 1835, he later attended the Kunstakademie Düsseldorf on a scholarship and studied with Johann Wilhelm Schirmer. He focused on genre art, but also painted plein air style at the Mittelrhein, the Main and throughout Hesse.

In 1841, Gerhardt von Reutern invited him to visit the Artists' Colony in Willingshausen, where he created scenes of village life. The following year, he opened a studio at the Städelschule and took further lessons with Anton Burger. In the early 1860s, he and Burger moved to Kronberg, where they founded their own artists' colony.

During the last ten years of his life, he suffered from an unspecified infirmity which hindered his ability to paint. He died in 1885, in Frankfurt.

== Work ==
- In addition to painting, he often worked as an illustrator, most notably for the four volumes of Robert Reinick's Lieder eines Malers mit Randzeichnungen seiner Freunde: (1838, Vol.1). (1838, vol.2). (1839 and 1846). (1852)
- His lithographs include those in: Adelheid von Stolterfoth: Rheinischer Sagenkreis. Ein Cyclus von Romanzen, Balladen und Legenden des Rheins. Jügel, Frankfurt (1835) (nbn-resolving.de) (English: The Rhenish minstrel. A Series of Ballads, traditional and legendary, of the Rhinelands (nbn-resolving.de)

(Digitalizations from the University and State Library Düsseldorf)
