= Henri Girardet =

French-Swiss Artist

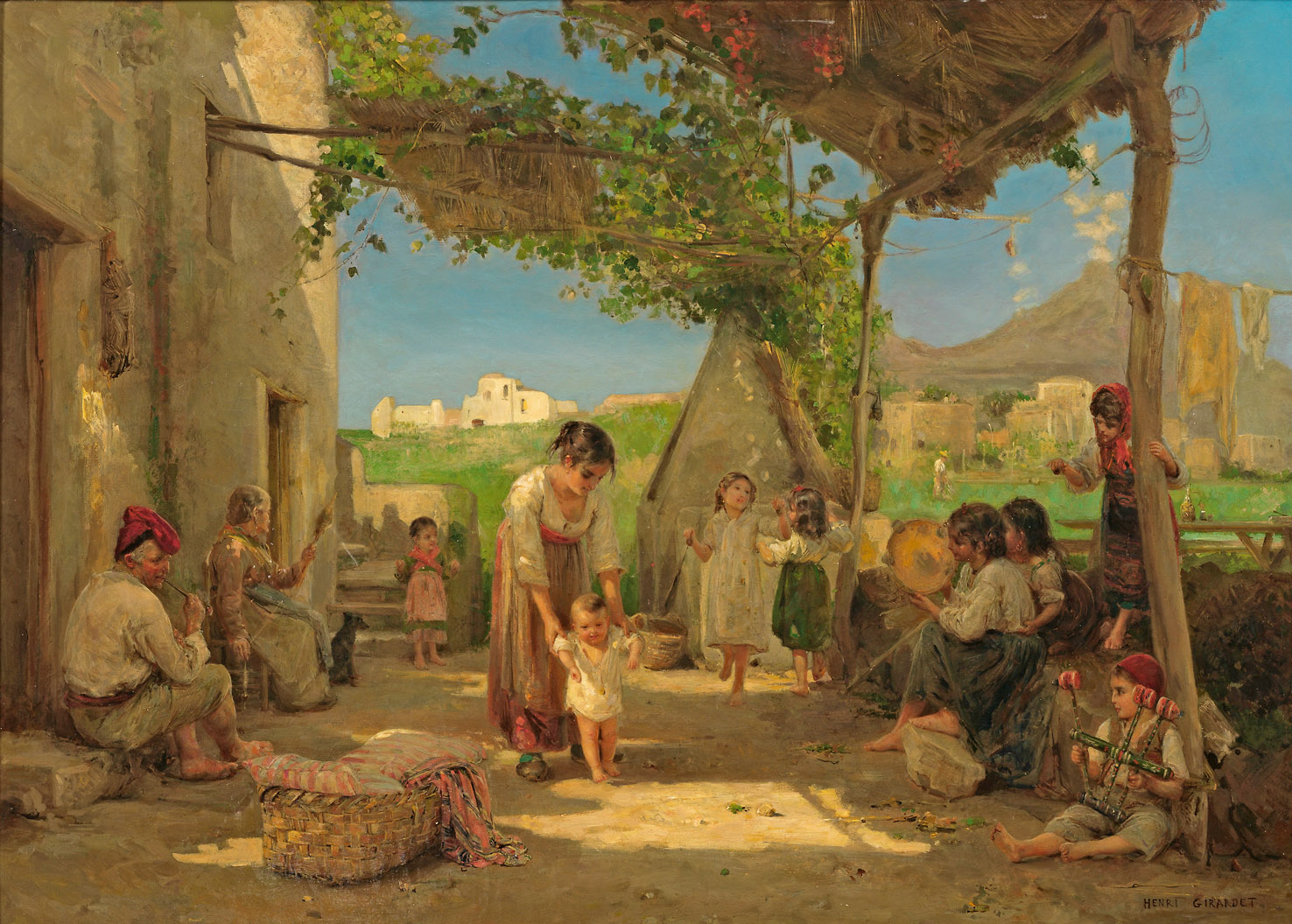
Children Playing (Naples)

Léopold-Henri Girardet (21 September 1848, Brienz - 10 December 1917, Neuchâtel) was a French-Swiss painter, sculptor, engraver, and lithographer.

== Life and work ==
He was born to a family of artists; which included his father, Edouard, and his uncles Karl and Paul. His brothers, Pierre (1850–1884), Robert (1851–1900) and Max (1857–1927), also became painters of some note. In 1857, when he was only nine, his family moved to Paris.

His initial lessons in drawing came from his father. Much of his career would be spent providing illustrations for the publisher and art dealer, Adolphe Goupil; especially for his journal, Le Magasin Pittoresque.

Although he was based in Paris, he spent most of his time travelling; throughout France, Italy and North Africa. After 1874, he was a regular participant in exhibitions at the Salon. In 1887, financial considerations forced him to return to Switzerland. At first, he lived in Brienz, then moved to Neuchâtel. In addition to genre paintings, he created portrait busts and medallions.

== Sources ==
- "Girardet, Henri (Léopold-Henri)". In: Ulrich Thieme, Fred. C. Willis (Eds.): Allgemeines Lexikon der Bildenden Künstler von der Antike bis zur Gegenwart, Vol.14: Giddens–Gress. E. A. Seemann, Leipzig 1921, pp. 165–166 (Online)
- René Burnand: L’étonnante histoire des Girardet. Artistes suisses. La Baconnière, Neuchâtel 1940, S. 299.
- René Burnand: Les Girardet au Locle et dans le monde. La Baconnière, Neuchâtel 1957.
- (in German) Renate Treydel: Girardet, Henri (Léopold-Henri). In: Allgemeines Künstlerlexikon. Die Bildenden Künstler aller Zeiten und Völker (AKL). Band 55, Saur, München u. a. 2007, ISBN 978-3-598-22795-0, S. 186
