= Gerhardt Wilhelm von Reutern =

German painter (1794–1865)

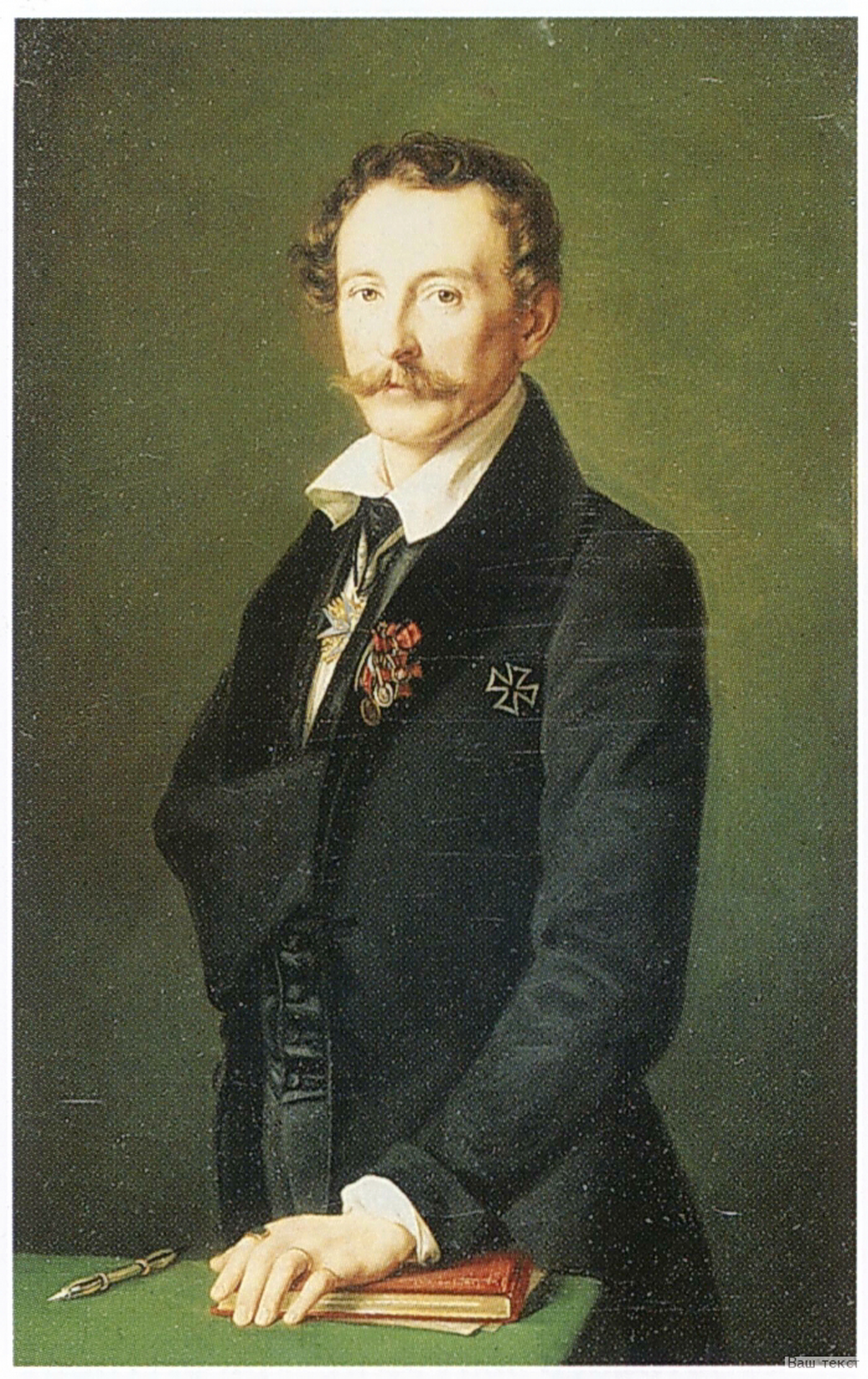
Gerhardt von Reutern, by Theodor Hildebrandt (1837)

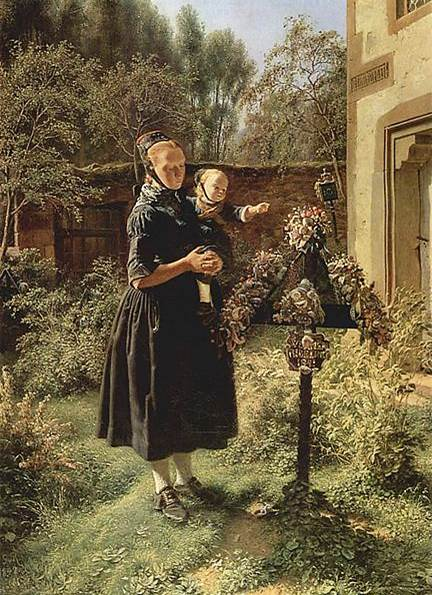
In the Cemetery at Willingshausen (1842)

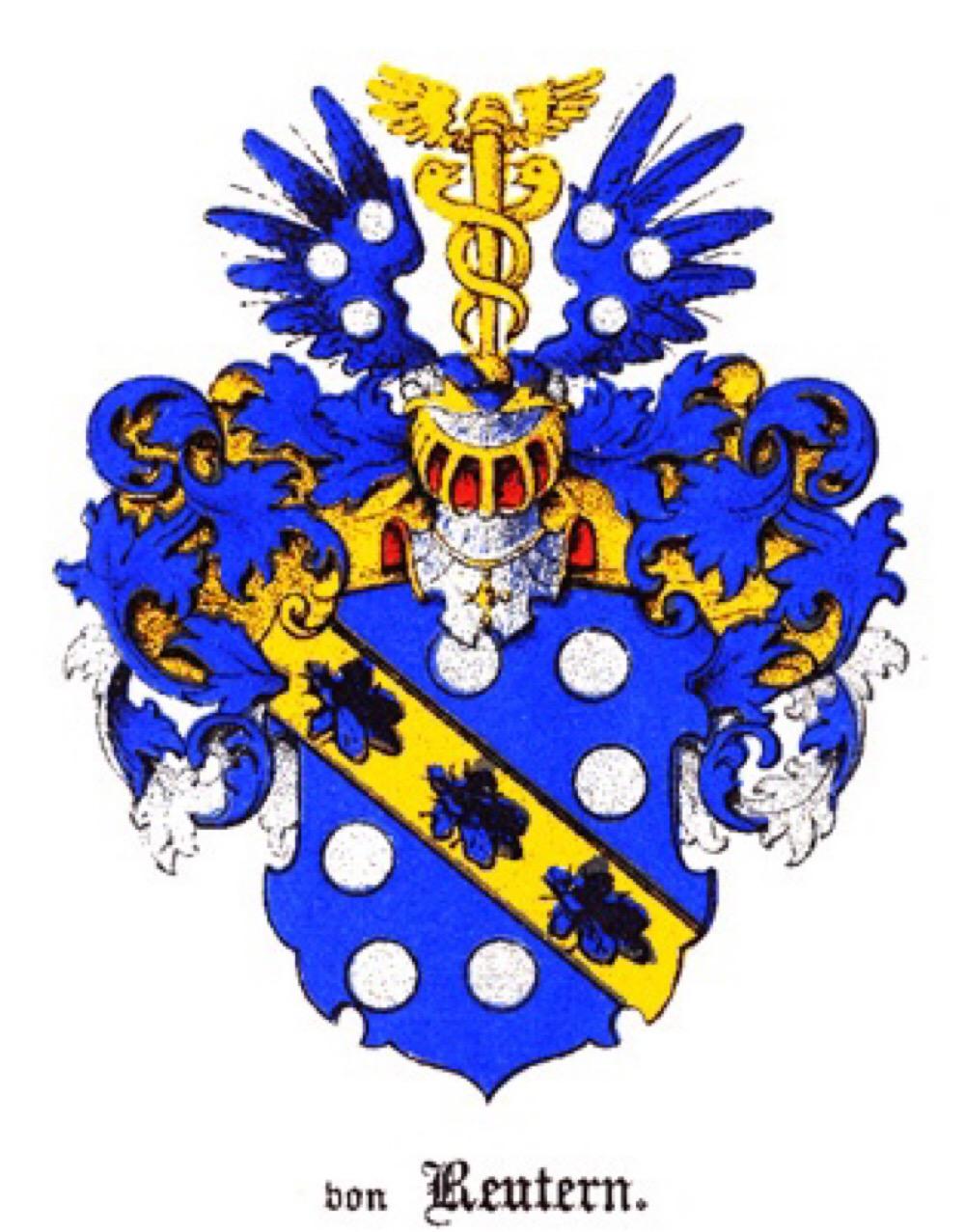
Arms Reutern family

Gerhardt Wilhelm von Reutern (17 July 1794, Walk – 22 March 1865, Frankfurt) was a Baltic-German military officer and painter who co-founded the Artists' Colony at Willingshausen.

== Life ==
He was born into a noble family of Baltic-Germans dating back to the 15th century. He participated in several campaigns during the Napoleonic Wars as a cavalry lieutenant and lost his right arm at the Battle of Leipzig. While recuperating with relatives, he took up drawing as a hobby. In the Summer of 1814, he made the acquaintance of Johann Wolfgang von Goethe, who urged him to become a painter. They maintained a steady correspondence until Goethe's death in 1832.

After serving in several adjutant positions, he resigned from the Army in 1819 with the rank of lieutenant-colonel. As part of his convalescence, he moved to Willingshausen and was married there in 1820. Four years later, he met Ludwig Emil Grimm and the idea for an Artists' Colony was born. They focused on genre scenes and landscapes from the Schwalm.

=== Studies ===
Having been self-taught up to this point, he began taking private lessons from his friend Grimm. When the climate in Willingshausen aggravated his wound, he moved to Geneva and studied with the Swiss painter Matthias Gabriel Lory, then attended the Kassel Art Academy where he studied under Karl Glinzer and Johann Martin von Rohden. In 1835, he moved to Düsseldorf and studied with Theodor Hildebrandt at the Art Academy there. Two years later, he was appointed to a position as Court Painter for the Imperial Russian family, with the right to live abroad, a concession obtained by his friend Vasily Zhukovsky, who would later become his son-in-law. In 1841, he invited his friend Jakob Fürchtegott Dielmann to oversee the Artists' Colony and spent his time moving between Russia, Germany, Switzerland and Italy. After three years of travelling, he settled in Frankfurt where he established a studio at the Villa Metzler.

In the early 1860s, he was forced to give up painting due to failing eyesight, rheumatism and unspecified "nervous complaints", probably brought about by the successive deaths of several friends and family members; including his wife, daughter Elisabeth and youngest son, Christoph.
