= Gabriel Lory the Younger =

Swiss landscape painter, etcher, watercolorist and illustrator

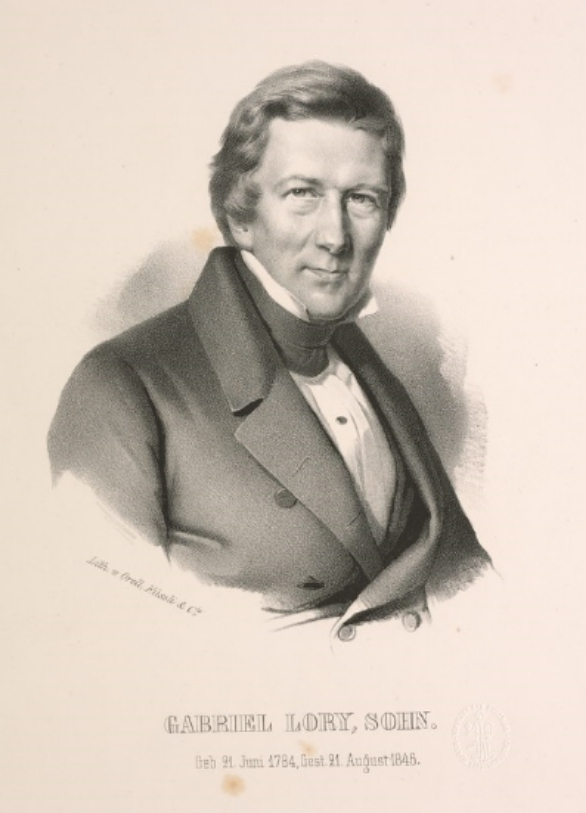
Gabriel Lory the Younger, Swiss National Library

Gabriel Lory the Younger, also known as Mathias Gabriel Lori (21 June 1784, Bern - 25 August 1846, Bern), was a Swiss landscape painter, etcher, watercolorist and illustrator. His father was the painter, Gabriel Lory the Elder.

== Biography ==
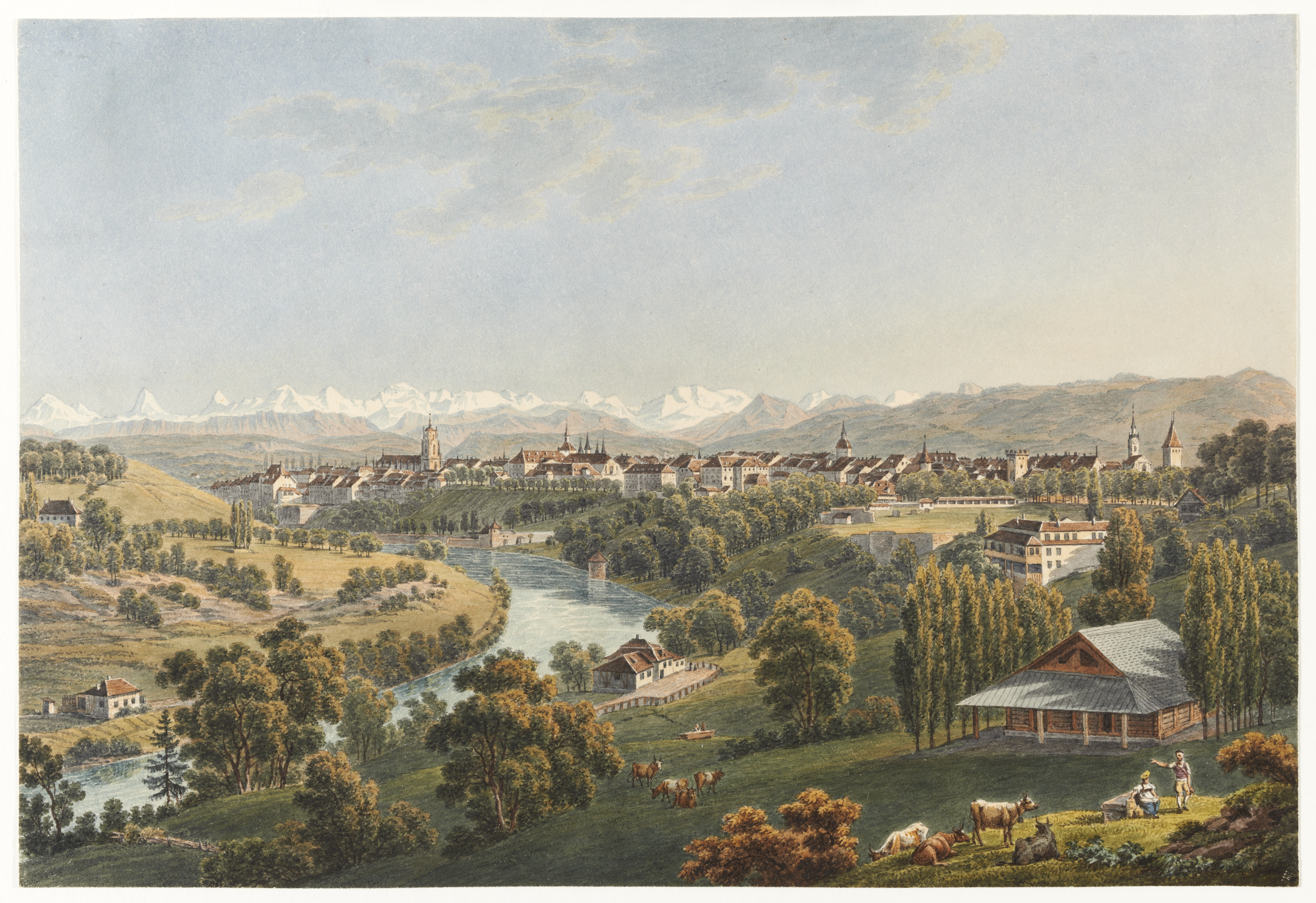
Bern, viewed from the North

He received his lessons in art from his father. In 1797, he moved with him to Herisau, where he assisted him with his projects. In 1805, he travelled with him again; this time to Neuchâtel, where he helped him edit the Voyage pittoresque de Genève à Milan par le Simplon. It was there that he made friends with the painter, Maximilien de Meuron, who he accompanied on trips to Paris and Italy.

In 1812, he married Henriette-Louise de Meuron von Orbe, a relative of his friend. Soon, he was able to find a position as a teacher in Neuchâtel, for the city schools, while Henriette acted as his publisher. He also made the acquaintance of the banker, Count Frédéric de Pourtalès, who became his new travelling partner on his excursions to Italy.

Both of their children died in 1819. After that, he and Henriette spent their summers in Bern and their winters in Neuchâtel. Over the next few years, together with César Henri Montvert (1784–1848), he published several works depicting traditional Swiss costumes and views of the Bernese Oberland. In 1828, he paid another visit to Paris, and was received at Court.

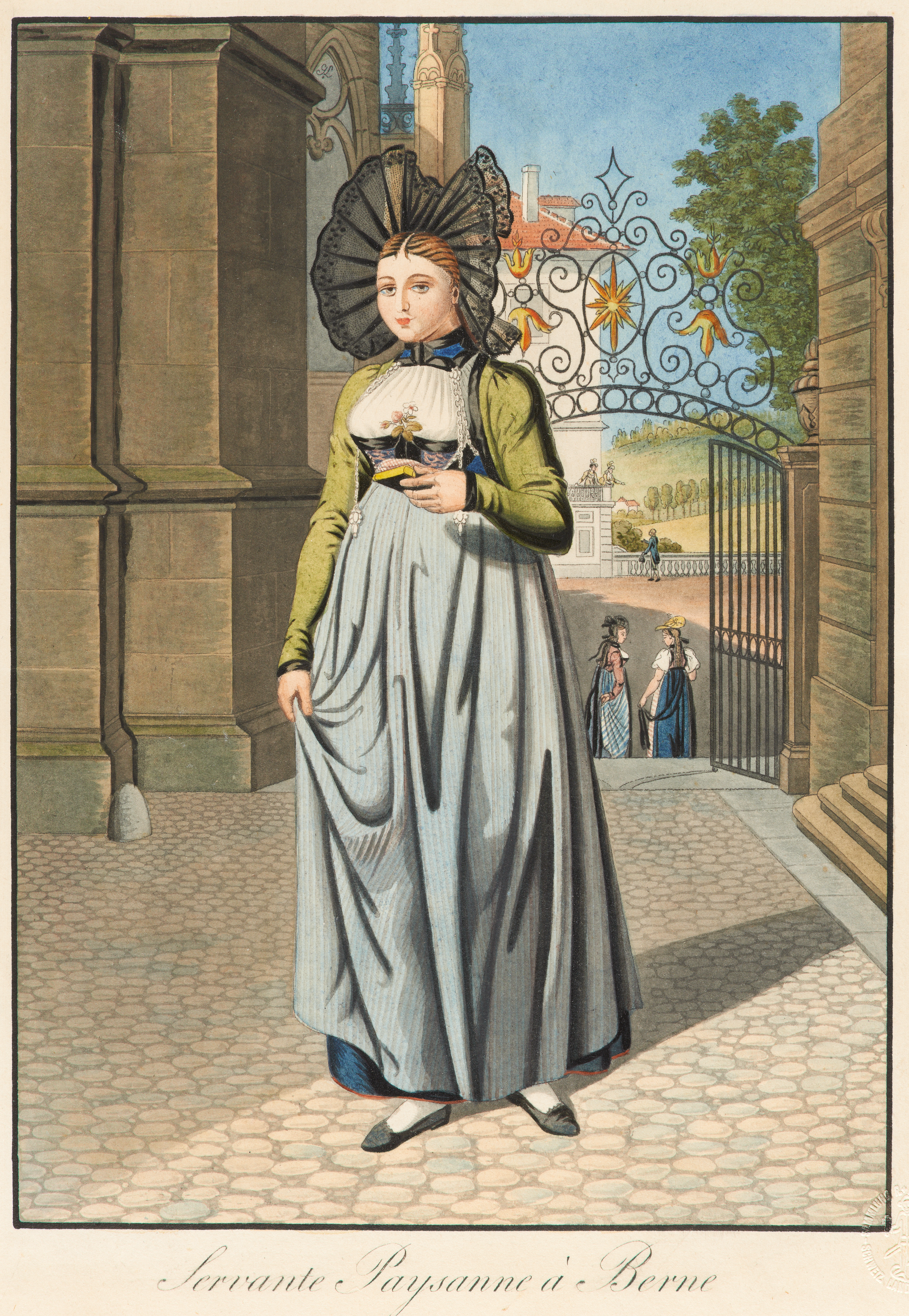
Traditional costume from Bern

In 1832, he settled permanently in Bern and became a member of the local artists' society; although he continued to travel throughout Switzerland and Italy. During the winters of 1834/35 and 1835/36, he was in Berlin. There, he given the largely honorary title of Associate Professor at the Academy of Arts.

In the 1840s, his health began to decline, so he started spending his winters in Nice. In 1846, he spent some time in Frankfurt am Main with his friend and former student, Gerhardt Wilhelm von Reutern. Shortly after returning home, he died of a heart attack.

== Sources ==
- "Lory, Gabriel (genannt Lory fils)". SIKART Lexicon on art in Switzerland.
- Lory, Gabriel (Fils) in German, French and Italian in the online Historical Dictionary of Switzerland.
