= Musée d'Art et d'Histoire (Neuchâtel) =

Coordinates: 46.9915°N 6.9355°E

Neuchâtel Museum of Art and History
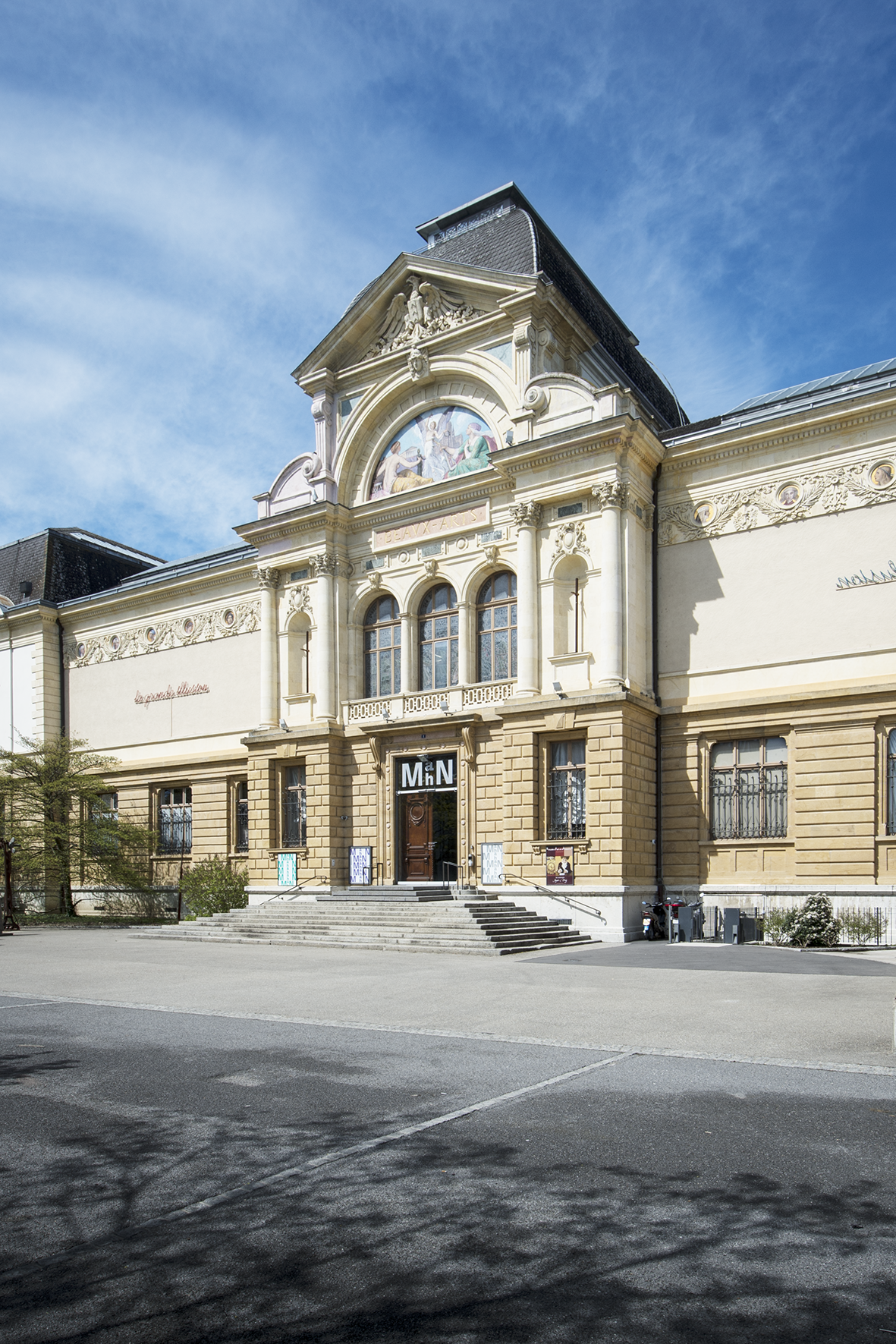
- Neuchâtel Museum of Art and History
- Established: 1884
- Location: Esplanade Léopold-Robert, Neuchâtel, Suisse
- Type: Art museum
- Website: https://www.mahn.ch/en

The Neuchâtel Museum of Art and History (MahN) is a fine arts museum located in Switzerland. It is housed in a building constructed between 1881 and 1887 by Léo Châtelain.

== History of the Museum and its collections ==
The Museum of Art and History of the City of Neuchâtel houses rich collections in the fields of visual arts, history, applied arts and numismatics.

The objects that form the core of the museums collections of the City of Neuchâtel originate from the cabinet of curiosities of General Charles Daniel de Meuron, which was donated to the City of Neuchâtel around 1795. While serving various colonial powers, he collected ethnographic, natural history and historical objects during his campaigns.

At the beginning of the 19th century, the city of Neuchâtel did not have any museums in the modern sense of the term. However, there were public collections of ethnography, numismatics, archaeology and, above all, natural history, which were kept in libraries in particular. In 1816, these collections were enriched by two paintings donated by Maximilien de Meuron, an artist, notable figure and patron of the arts from an aristocratic Neuchâtel family: View of Ancient Rome and View of Modern Rome, which were the first works in the city's painting collection.

In the 1830s, a number of collections were also installed in rooms in the newly built Latin College. These included coins, medals, instruments, clothing and weapons. In 1840, a small painting museum was also set up in a room in the Latin College building.

In 1842, Maximilien de Meuron founded the Société des Amis des Arts (SAA, Society of Friends of the Arts), which contributed greatly to the enrichment of the painting collections. The SAA organised biannual exhibitions for Neuchâtel artists in various buildings around the city and, from 1864 onwards, in the newly built Léopold-Robert Galleries.

In the 1870s, the idea of building a painting museum took shape. The initial project was quickly expanded to include other collections, known as historical and ethnographic collections. The final project brought together two separate museums in the same building: a fine arts museum and a historical museum. The former was inaugurated in 1884 on the first floor of the new building under the name ‘Museum of Fine Arts’. The latter opened in 1885 on the ground floor of the building under the name ‘Historical Museum’; the latter housed not only historical collections, but also archaeological and ethnographic collections. The combination of these various collections made the Neuchâtel building one of the first newly constructed museum buildings in Switzerland, housing several disciplines under one roof. In 1904, the ethnographic collections left the Historical Museum to join the new Museum of Ethnography in Neuchâtel.

In 1952, the SAA transferred the Léopold-Robert Galleries to the City of Neuchâtel and in exchange obtained the right to use the new wing built to the west of the Museum of Fine Arts. The archaeological collections were handed over to the State of Neuchâtel and in 1962 formed the Cantonal Museum of Archaeology.

In a significant step, the Museum of Fine Arts and the Historical Museum merged in 1989–1990 under the name ‘Museum of Art and History’. Today, the encyclopaedic nature of the museum, which for a long time was more imposed than desired by its managers, is recognised as one of its main assets.

The collections were significantly expanded in the 20th and 21st centuries. The Museum of Art and History now holds more than 150,000 objects and images covering a period from antiquity to the present day, in addition to a rich photographic collection. The main collections are accessible online.

== Architecture ==
Built between 1881 and 1887 based on plans by Léo Châtelain, the building that houses the current Museum of Art and History was inaugurated in 1884/85 in the new fine arts district reclaimed from the lake. For over 100 years, it housed two separate museums: a Museum of Fine Arts and a History Museum. Two low wings were added to the building in 1952 and 1953. With its palatial architecture, typical of museums of the same period, the building features a monumental entrance, a symmetrical layout and décor that includes polychrome stones, mosaics and sculptures, as well as blind walls that indicate its purpose.

The rooms are arranged symmetrically around a large central vestibule and a monumental staircase decorated by Léo-Paul Robert. The rooms on the ground floor originally housed historical, archaeological and ethnographic collections, as well as sculptures. The first floor, then devoted to fine arts, comprises nine rooms with overhead lighting.

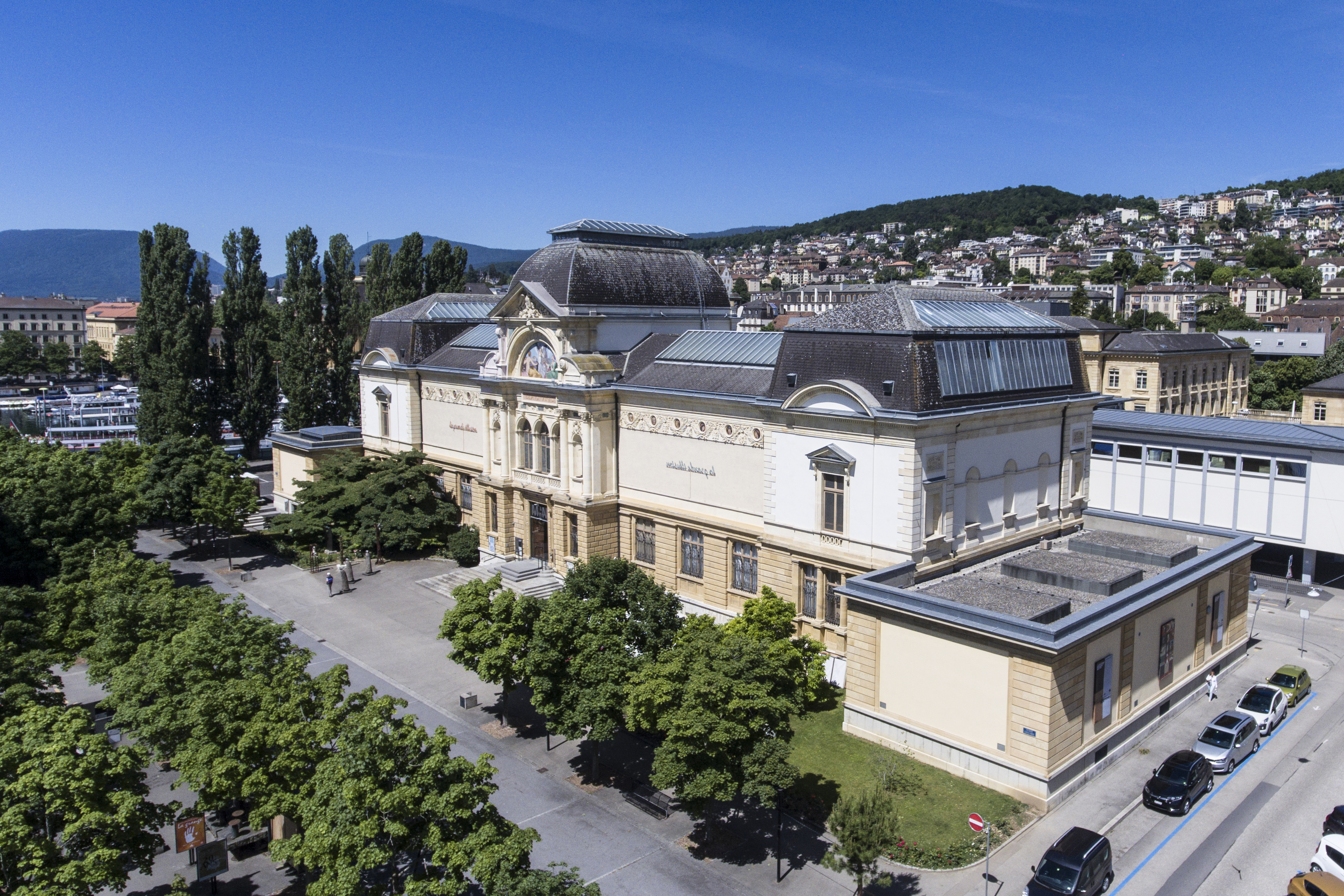
Neuchâtel Museum of Arts and History. MahN. Photo: Stefano Iori

== The stairwell ==
The décor of the stairwell at the Museum of Art and History is a masterpiece of total art that is unique in Switzerland. Created by Neuchâtel painter Léo-Paul Robert, the decorative ensemble was mainly produced between 1886, when the three large paintings were commissioned, and 1908, when the large stained-glass window was installed on the museum's façade.

Robert's monumental canvases represent the three regions of the canton: Neuchâtel, or intellectual and moral life; The Val-de-Ruz, or rustic life; and La Chaux-de-Fonds, or industrial life. They convey a strong religious message, which is amplified by the ornamentation of the walls and dome, created in collaboration with the English decorative artist Clement Heaton. In a celebration of the divine through the representation of plants and celestial beings, this setting was created using innovative techniques developed especially for this project, such as embossed wallpaper and cloisonné.

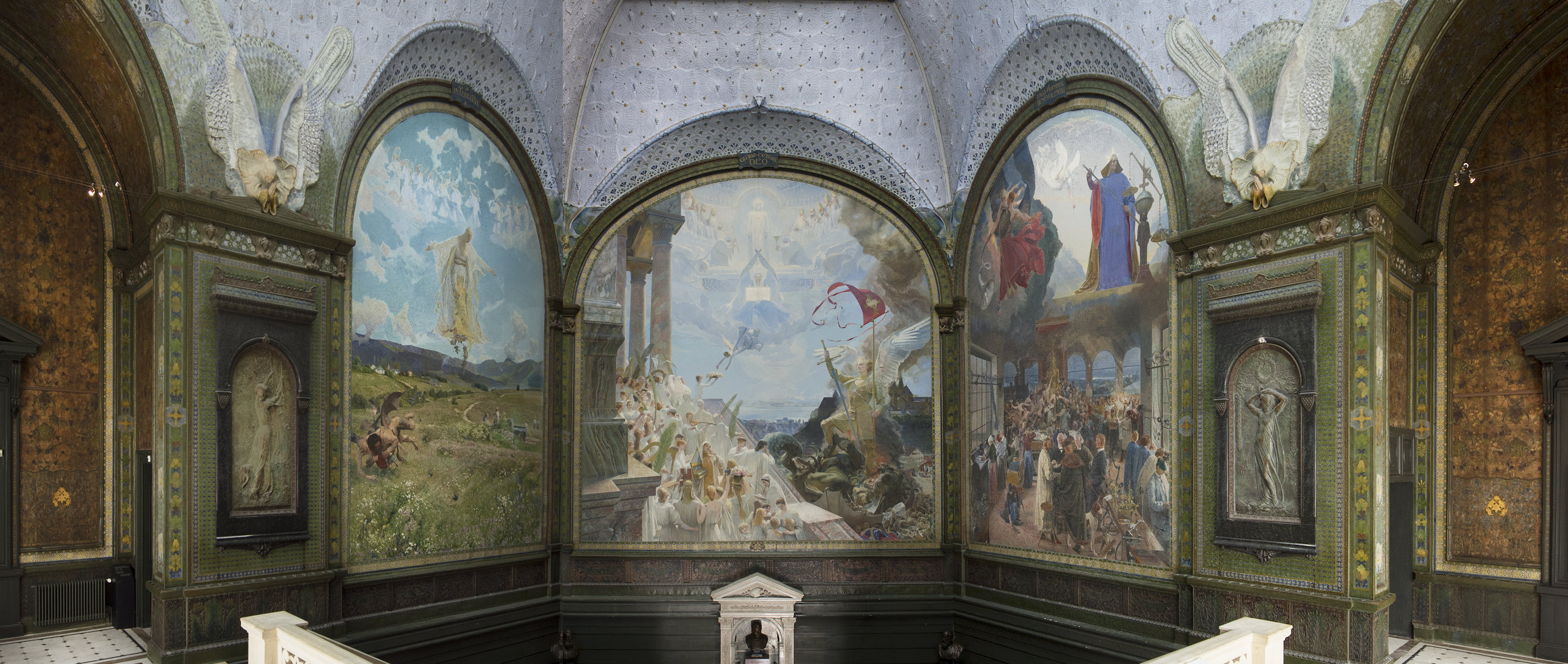

== Jaquet-Droz automata ==
The three famous automata, masterpieces of the Museum of Art and History's collections, were created in Pierre Jaquet-Droz's watchmaking workshop in La Chaux-de-Fonds between 1768 and 1774. A complex clockwork mechanism provides them with power, and a set of cams regulates their movements. The first in the series is the Writer, which is also the most complicated of the three androids: it is programmable and can write any text of 40 characters on four lines. Its visual counterpart is the Draughtsman, which can execute four different drawings. The Musician, meanwhile, plays five melodies on an organ. These three automata were first shown in La Chaux-de-Fonds in 1774, then presented to a select audience in Paris, London, Lyon and Geneva, among other cities.

The Mechanical Show brought fame to the Jaquet-Droz company throughout Europe. After a long journey across Europe, the three automata were donated to the City of Neuchâtel in 1909 and became part of its historical museum.

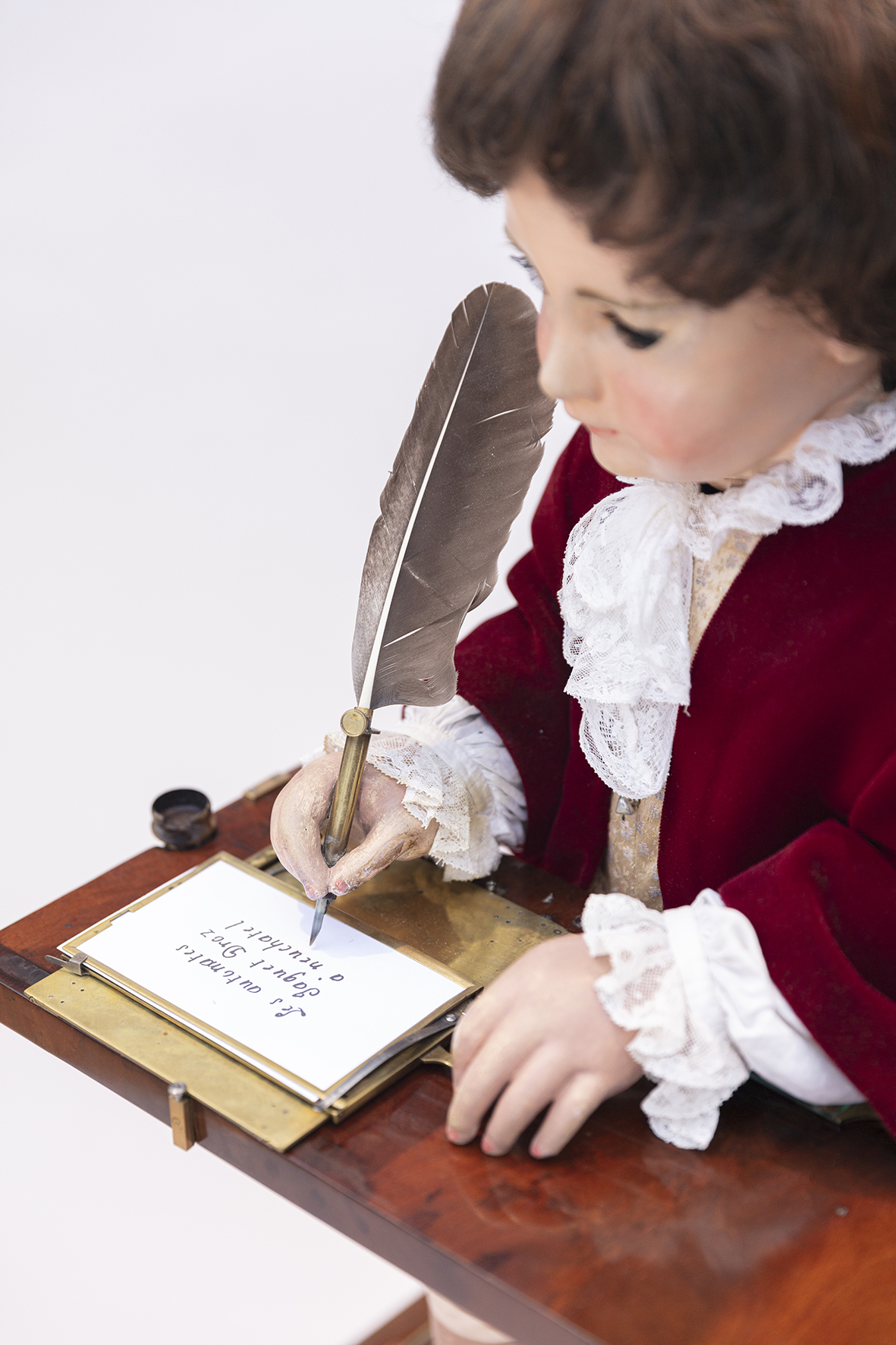

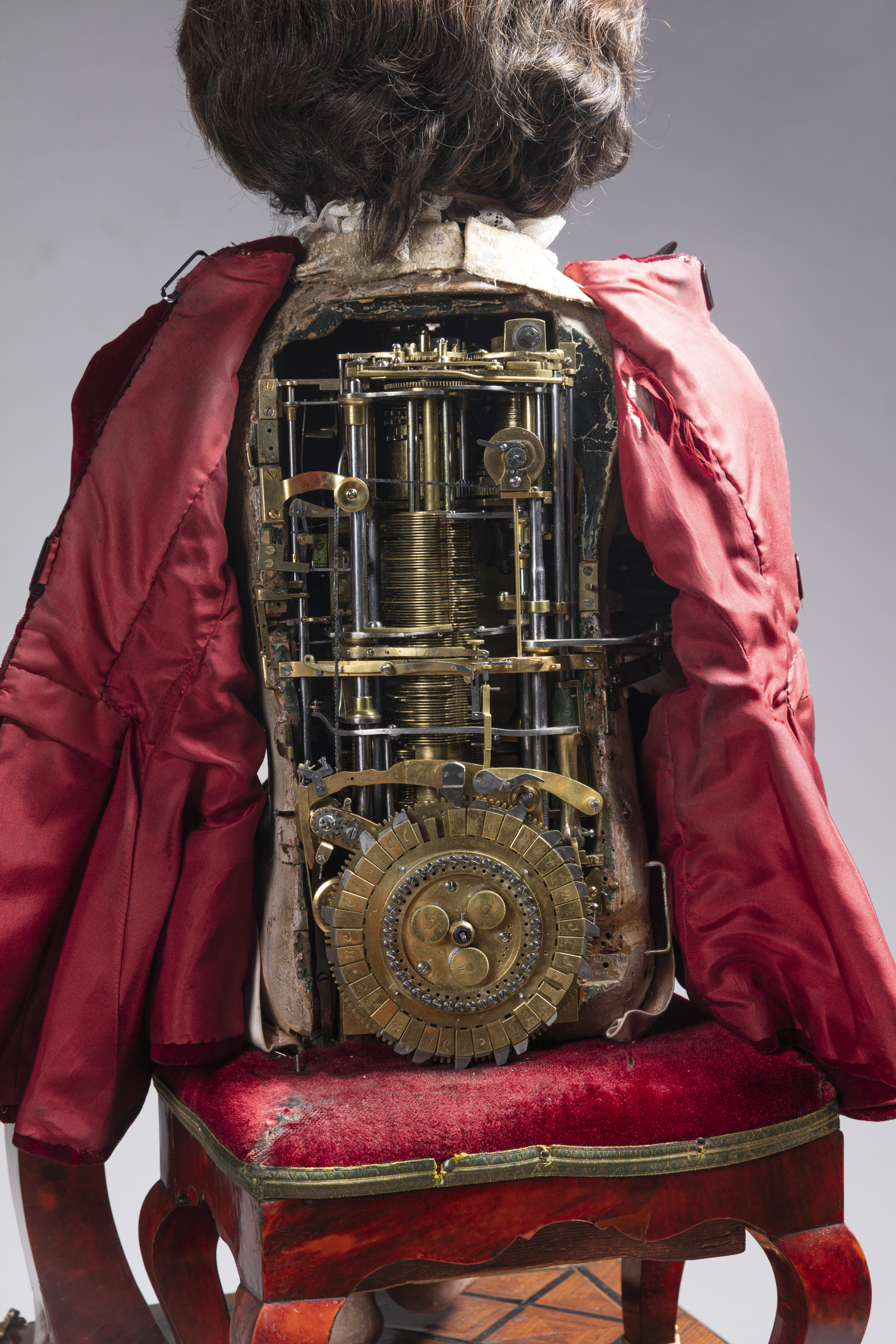

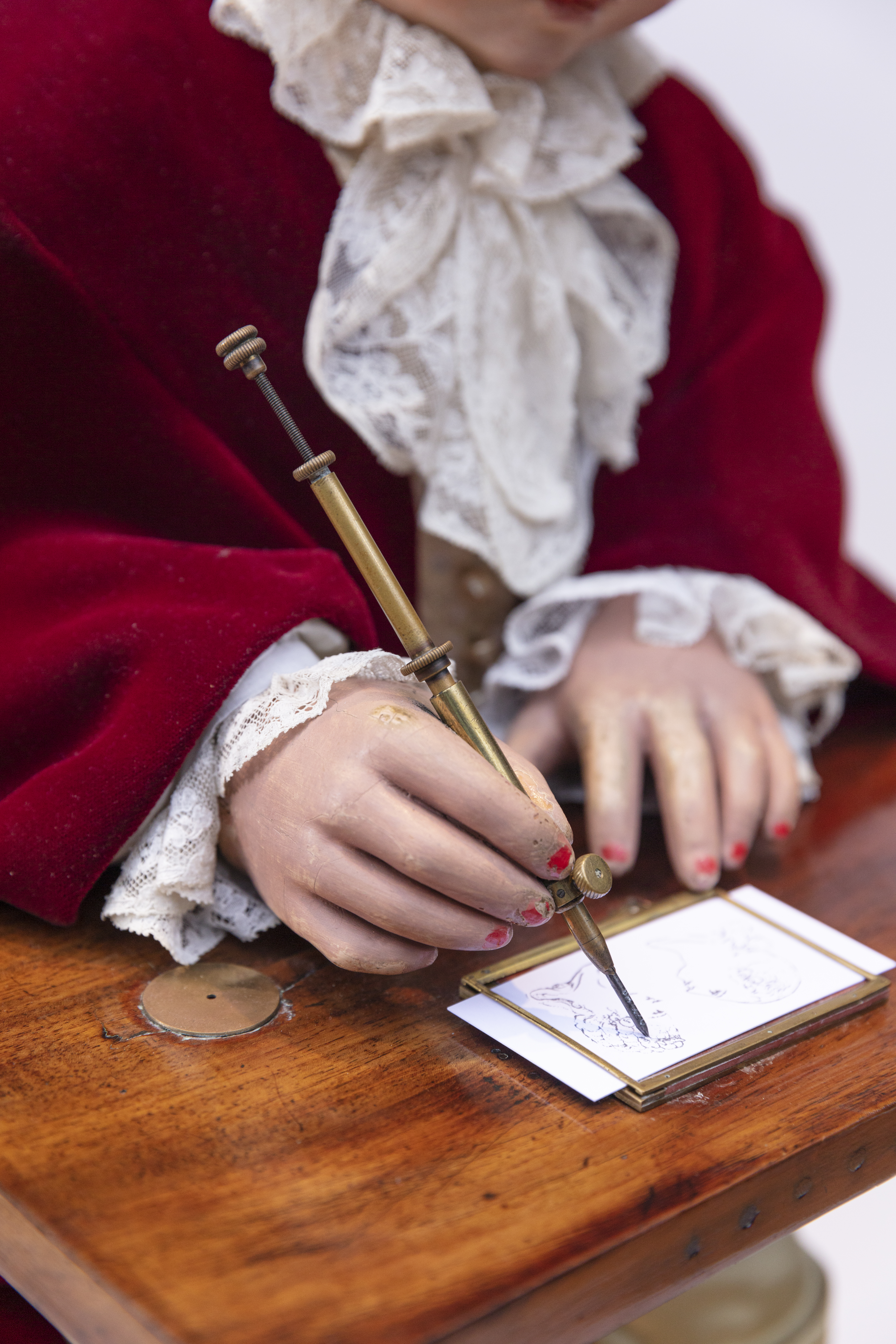

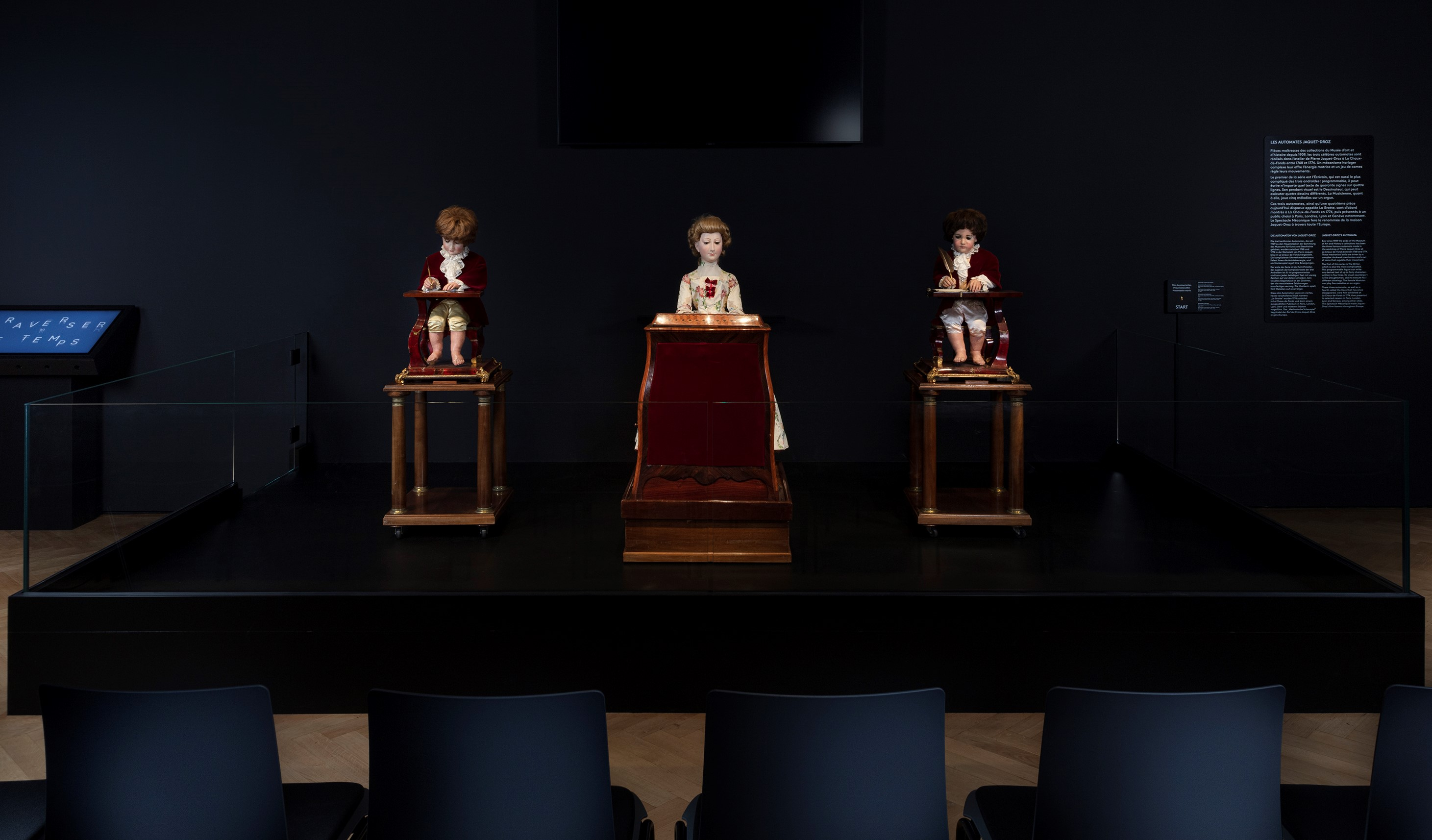

== The Amez-Droz Bequest ==
In 1979, the Neuchâtel Museum of Art and History received a significant donation from James Adolphe Yvan Amez-Droz. A wealthy owner of a perfume and cosmetics company, Amez-Droz bequeathed the modern part of his collection to show his affection for Neuchâtel, the cradle of his family.

The collection, comprising 69 works, brings together various French artists from the 19th and 20th centuries, from the Plein Air movement to the early École de Paris. At the heart of the collection are the famous Impressionist artists Edgar Degas, Claude Monet, Berthe Morisot and Auguste Renoir. Some works, such as Monet's Bateau-Atelier, are now among the institution's masterpieces.

Assembled in Paris between the 1920s and 1960s, the collection was the subject of provenance research between 2019 and 2021 with the support of the Federal Office of Culture.

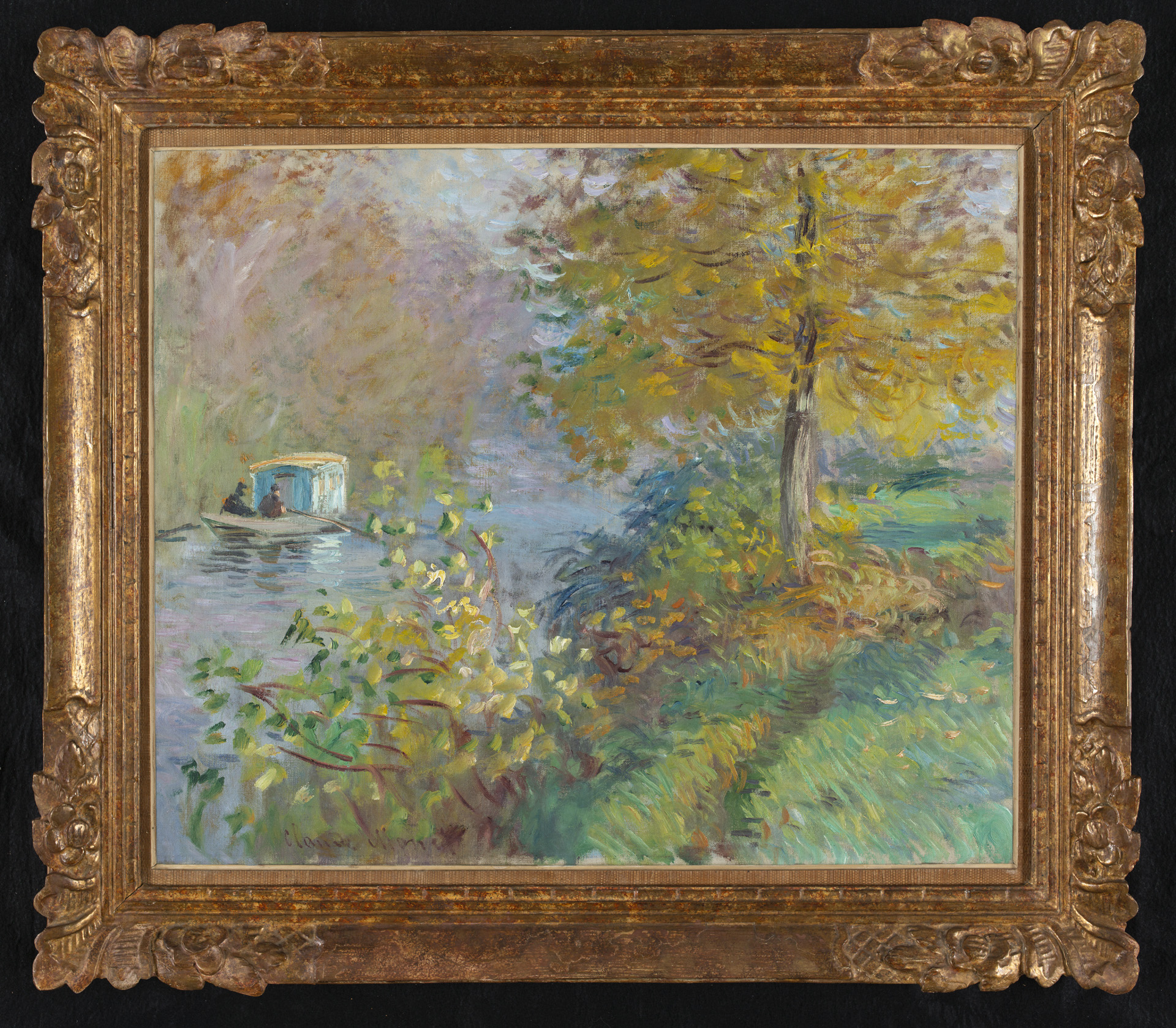

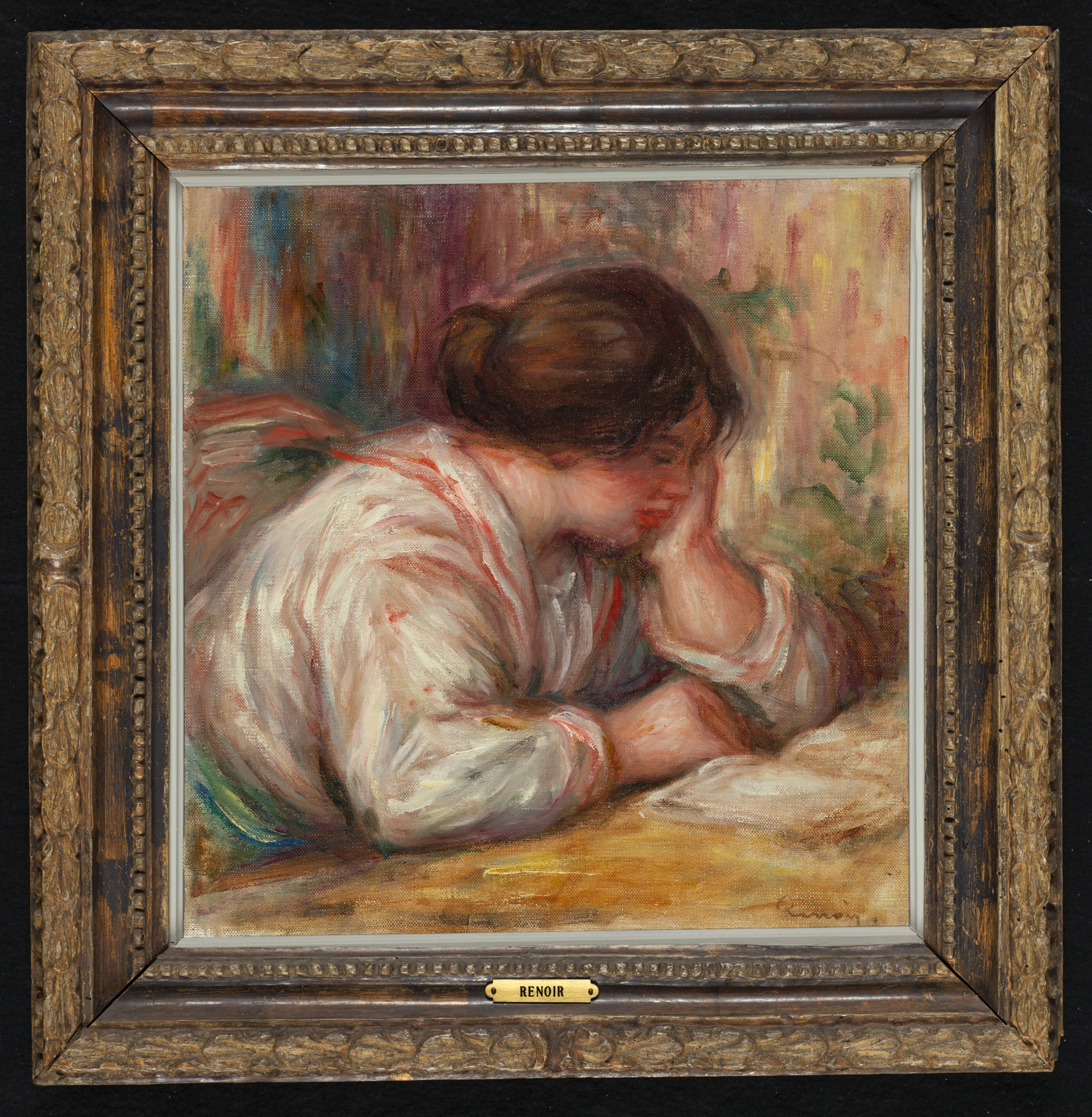

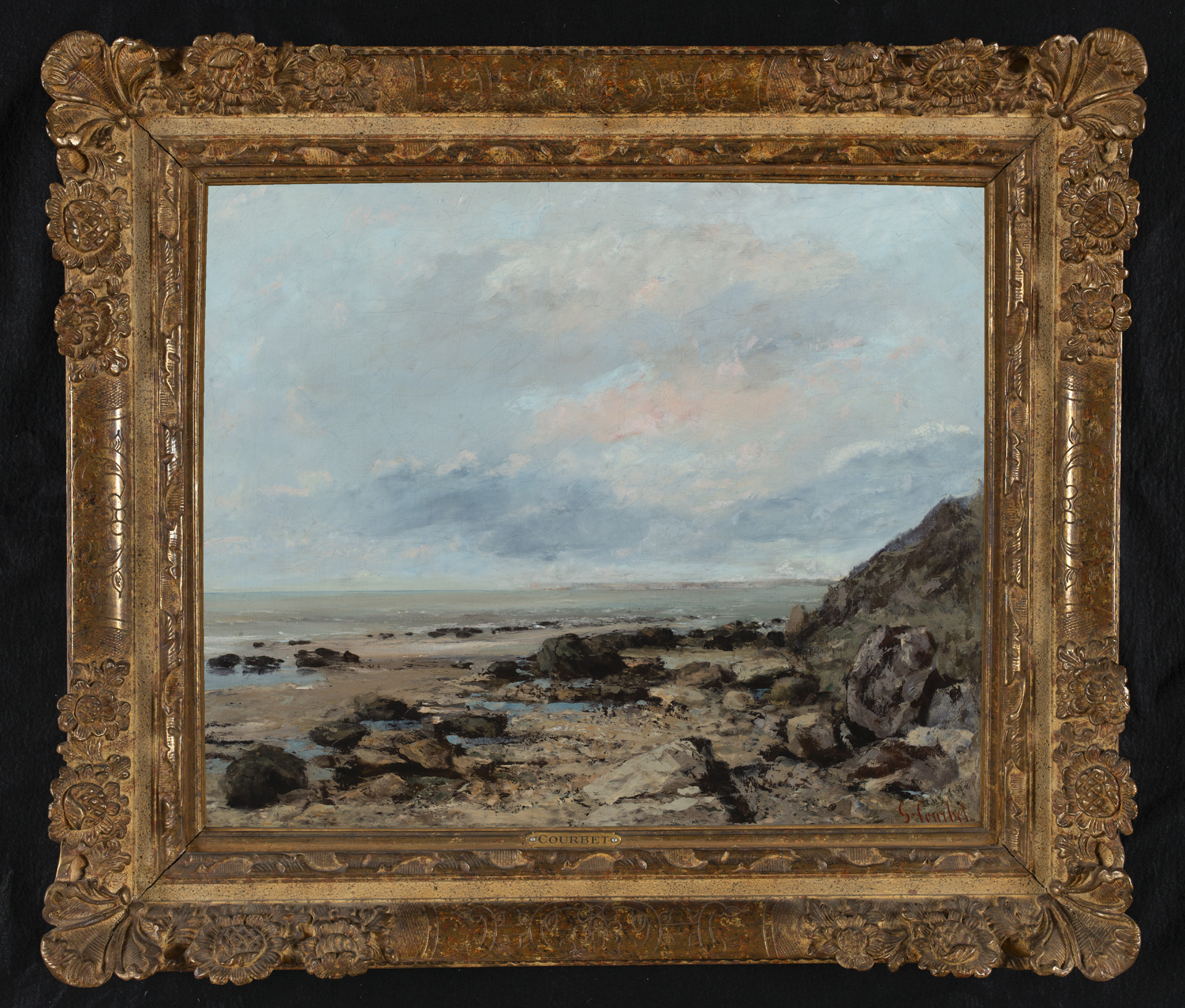

== Movements ==
In 2022, the Neuchâtel Museum of Art and History inaugurated a new permanent exhibition that brings its rich collections into dialogue through the prism of movement[i]. The subject allows connections to be made with contemporary issues, such as migration, the impact of crises and wars, Swiss participation in colonial enterprise, the international circulation of goods and techniques, the links between trade networks and the transatlantic slave trade, and artistic exchanges, which connect the canton of Neuchâtel with the rest of the world.

The exhibition, which is based on the collections of the institution's four departments, also incorporates the perspectives of contemporary artists, whose works offer a universal and timeless exploration of the theme of movement and reveal the museum's collections from a new angle.

== Exhibitions ==
The Neuchâtel Museum of Art and History offers three types of exhibitions: major temporary exhibitions in the rooms on the first floor, thematic exhibitions, and permanent or semi-permanent exhibitions. These events are part of a programme that alternates between the museum's different areas of expertise, namely the visual arts, history, applied arts and numismatics. The Yvan & Hélène Amez-Droz Bequest, the total art decoration of the museum's stairwell, the Ruckers harpsichord, the historical models of the city of Neuchâtel and the sculpture park on the Esplanade Léopold-Robert are also part of the institution's permanent displays.

Organised since 2025, the exhibition dossiers are small-scale events that highlight various aspects of the institution's rich collections, new acquisitions or contemporary creations.

== See also ==
- List of museums in Switzerland
