= Gabriel Lory =

Bernese landscape painter and illustrator

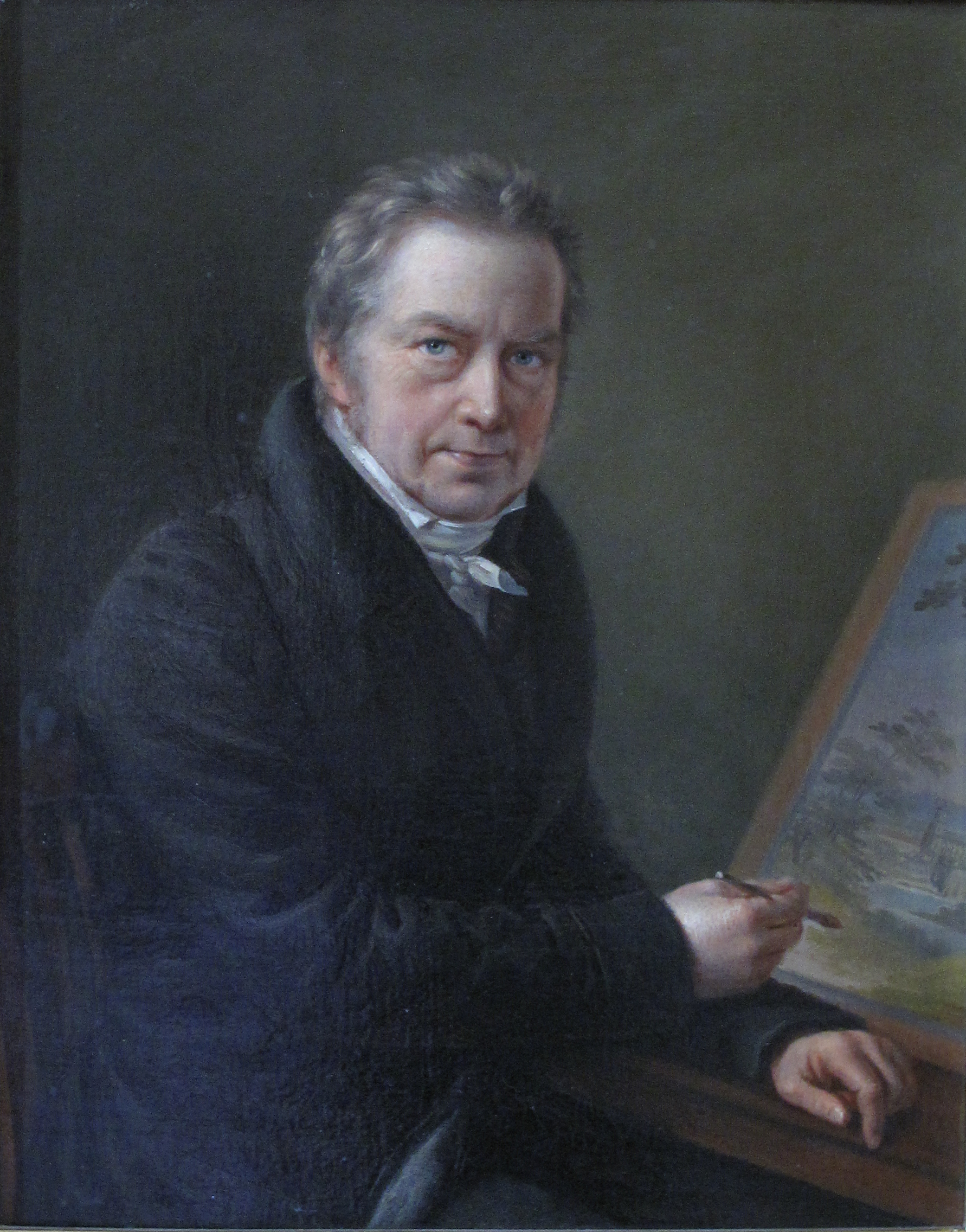
1825 portrait by David Sulzer

Gabriel Lory the Elder (Gabriel Ludwig Lori, Lory le père; 1763 – November 1840) was a landscape painter and illustrator from Bern. He was the father of Gabriel Lory the Younger (Mathias Gabriel Lori, 1784–1846).

== Biography ==
He worked as an apprentice with Johann Ludwig Aberli and Caspar Wolf of Bern; later with Louis Albert Guislain Bacler d'Albe and Jean-François Albanis de Beaumont (1755–1812) of Geneva. He was employed as an illustrator with St. Gallen publisher Bartholomäus Fehr and married Fehr's sister Wilborada.

From 1784, Lory was back in Bern, working on an edition of colorized landscape panoramas. In 1787, he edited art prints with Simon Daniel Lafond (1763-1831), mostly motifs of the Bernese Oberland, later also landscapes from other parts of the canton of Bern, Ticino and central Switzerland. A compilation of his Swiss landscape prints was edited in Leipzig in 1795. He worked in Herisau during 1795–1801, editing views of Moscow and St Petersburg. During 1805–1812, he worked in Neuchâtel for the cartographer, Jean-Frédéric d’Ostervald. Together with his son, he published Voyage pittoresque de Genève à Milan par le Simplon (1811) and Voyage pittoresque dans la vallée de Chamouni et autour du Montblanc (1815), two illustrated travel diaries.

From 1812 until his death he resided in his native Bern. His first wife died in 1814, and he married Barbara Fuchser of Oberdiessbach in 1816.
