= Theodor Hildebrandt =

German painter (1804–1874)

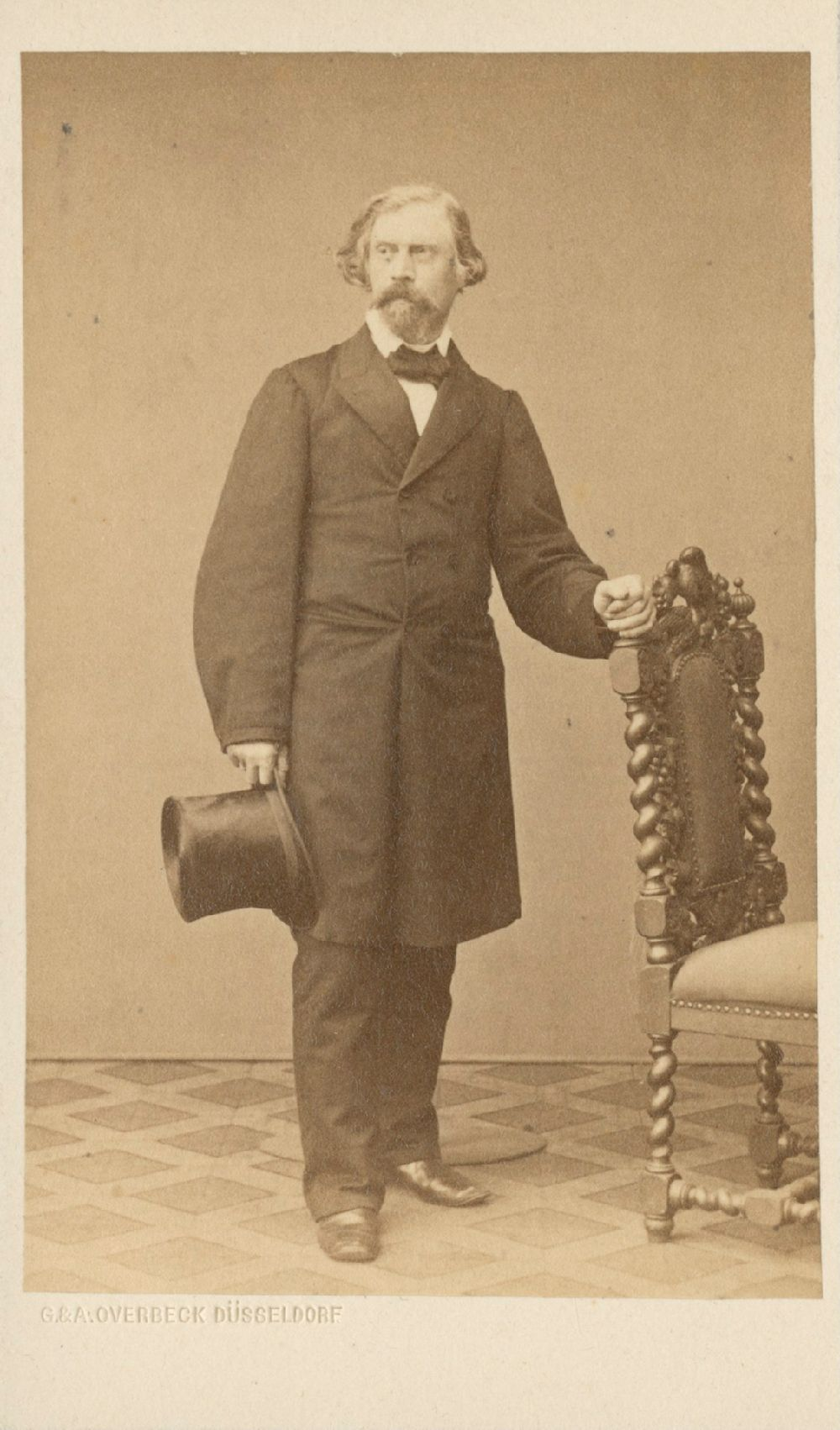
- Theodor Hildebrandt by G. & A. Overbeck (firm), c. 1868
- Born: July 2, 1804; Stettin, Kingdom of Prussia
- Died: September 29, 1874; Düsseldorf, German Empire
- Known for: Painting, Entomology
- Notable work: Murder of the Children of King Edward (1836), Faust and Mephistopheles (1824)
- Movement: Düsseldorf school of painting

Theodor Hildebrandt (2 July 1804, Stettin – 29 September 1874, Düsseldorf) was a German artist of the Düsseldorf school of painting who specialized in literary and historical subjects. He was also a noted entomologist.

== Biography ==
He was a disciple of the painter Schadow, and, on Schadow's appointment to the presidency of a new academy in the Rhenish provinces in 1828, followed that master to Düsseldorf. Hildebrandt began by painting pictures illustrative of Goethe and Shakespeare; but in this form he followed the traditions of the stage rather than the laws of nature. He produced rapidly "Faust and Mephistopheles" (1824), "Faust and Margaret" (1825), and "Lear and Cordelia" (1828). He is associated with the Düsseldorf school of painting.

He visited the Netherlands with Schadow in 1829, and wandered alone in 1830 to Italy; but travel did not alter his style, though it led him to cultivate alternately eclecticism and realism.

At Düsseldorf, about 1830, he produced "Romeo and Juliet," "Tancred and Clorinda," and other works which deserved to be classed with earlier paintings; but during the same period he exhibited (1829) the "Robber" and (1832) the "Captain and his Infant Son," examples of an affected but kindly realism, which captivated the public, and marked to a certain extent an epoch in Prussian art. The picture which made Hildebrandt's fame is the "Murder of the Children of King Edward" (1836), of which the original, afterwards frequently copied, still belongs to the Spiegel collection at Halberstadt.

Comparatively late in life Hildebrandt tried his powers as an historical painter in pictures representing Wolsey and Henry VIII, but he lapsed again into the romantic in "Othello and Desdemona." After 1847 Hildebrandt gave himself up to portrait-painting, and in that branch succeeded in obtaining a large practice. Hildebrandt was also an entomologist specialising in Coleoptera and a Member of the Entomological Society of Stettin. He died at Düsseldorf in 1874.

== Selected paintings ==
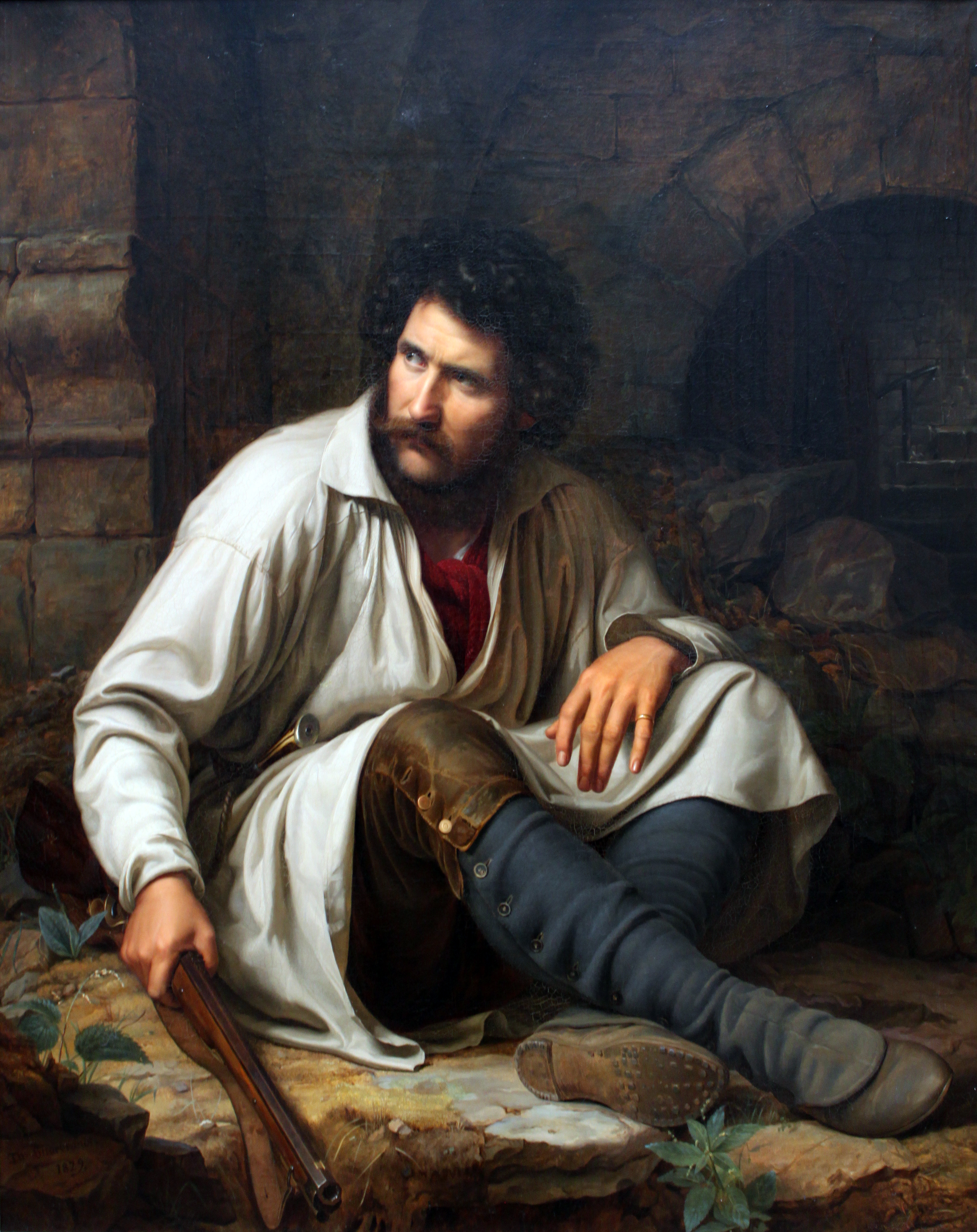
The Robber (1829)

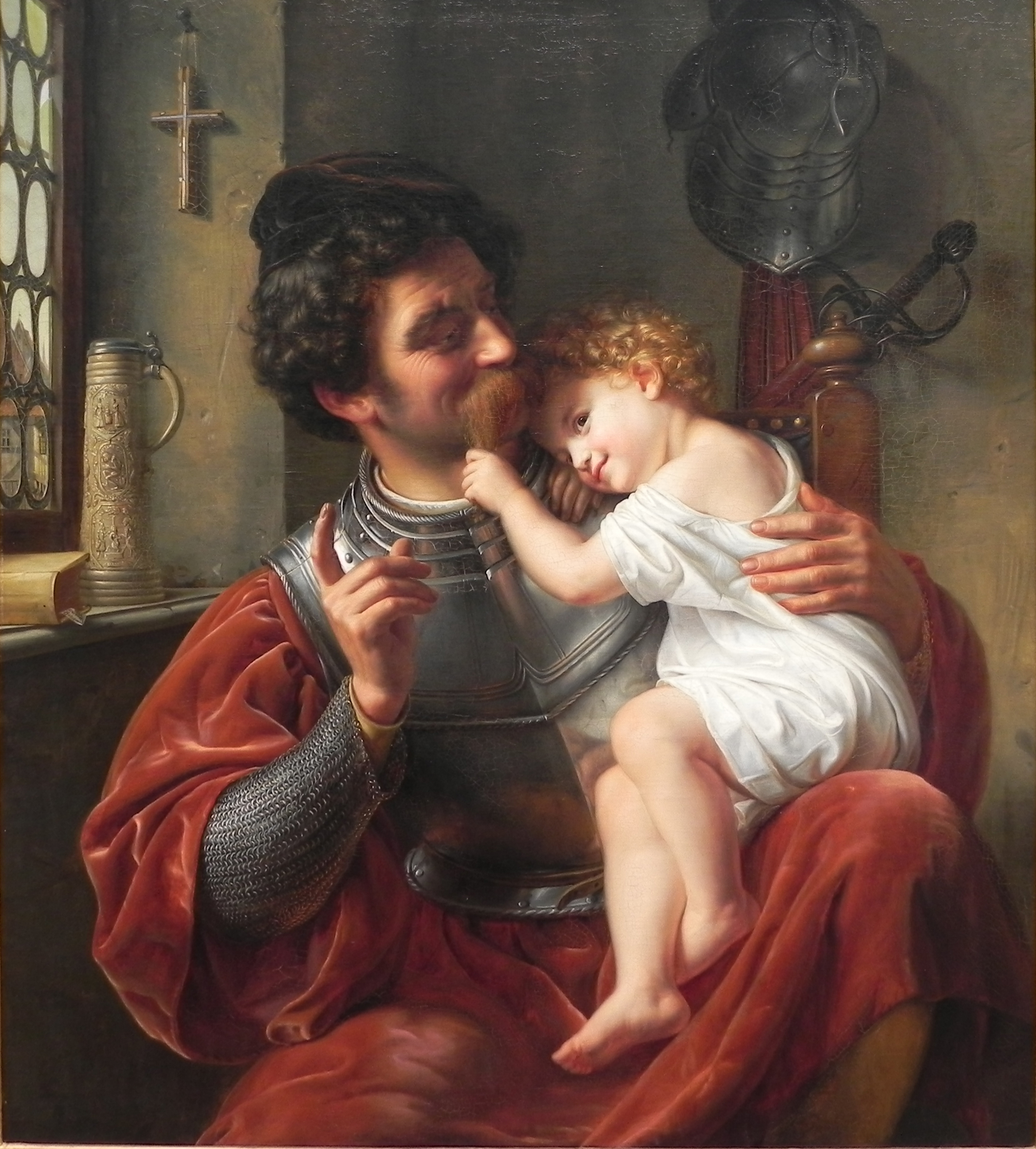
The Captain and
His Infant Son (1832)

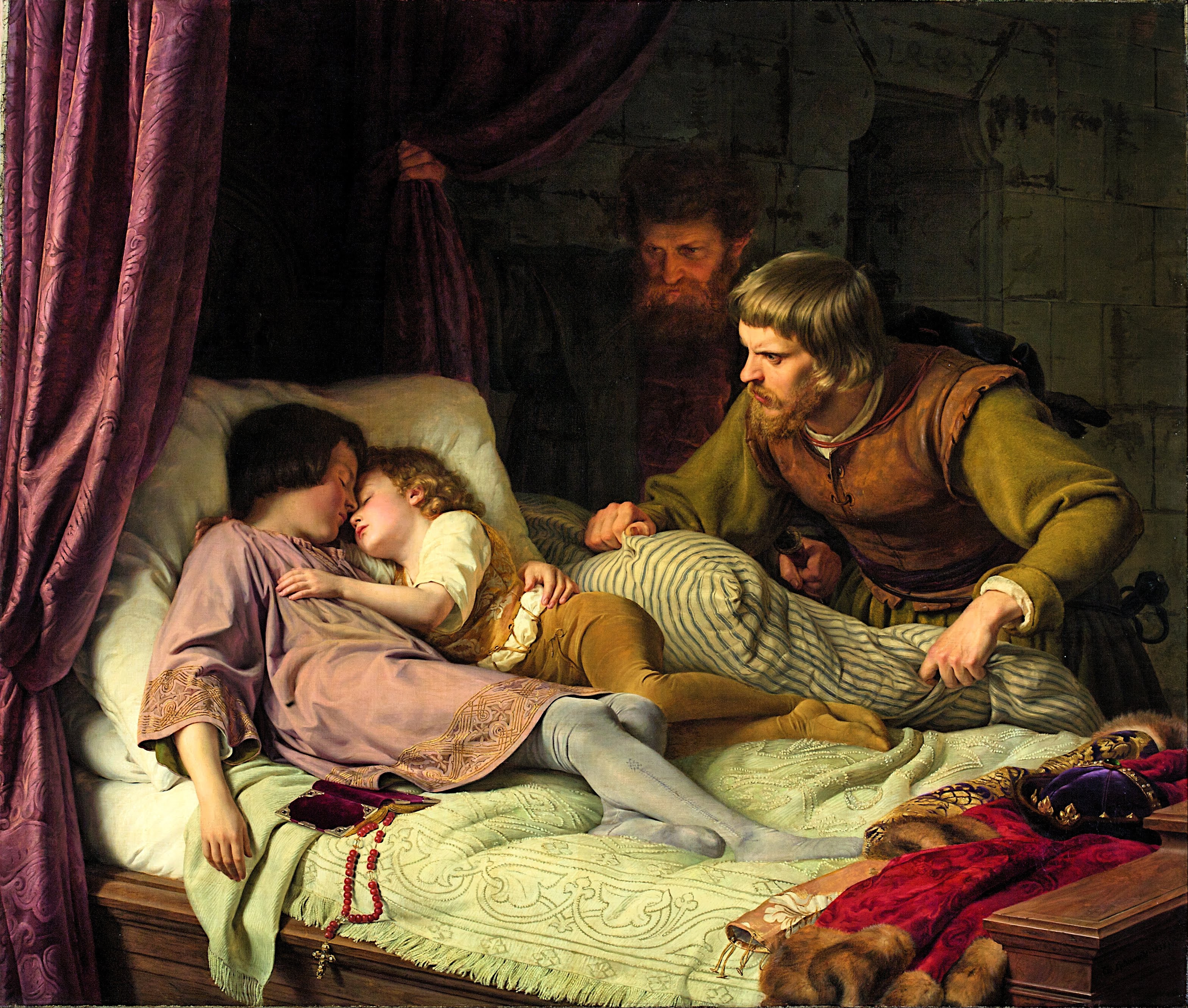
The Murder of the Children of King Edward (1835)

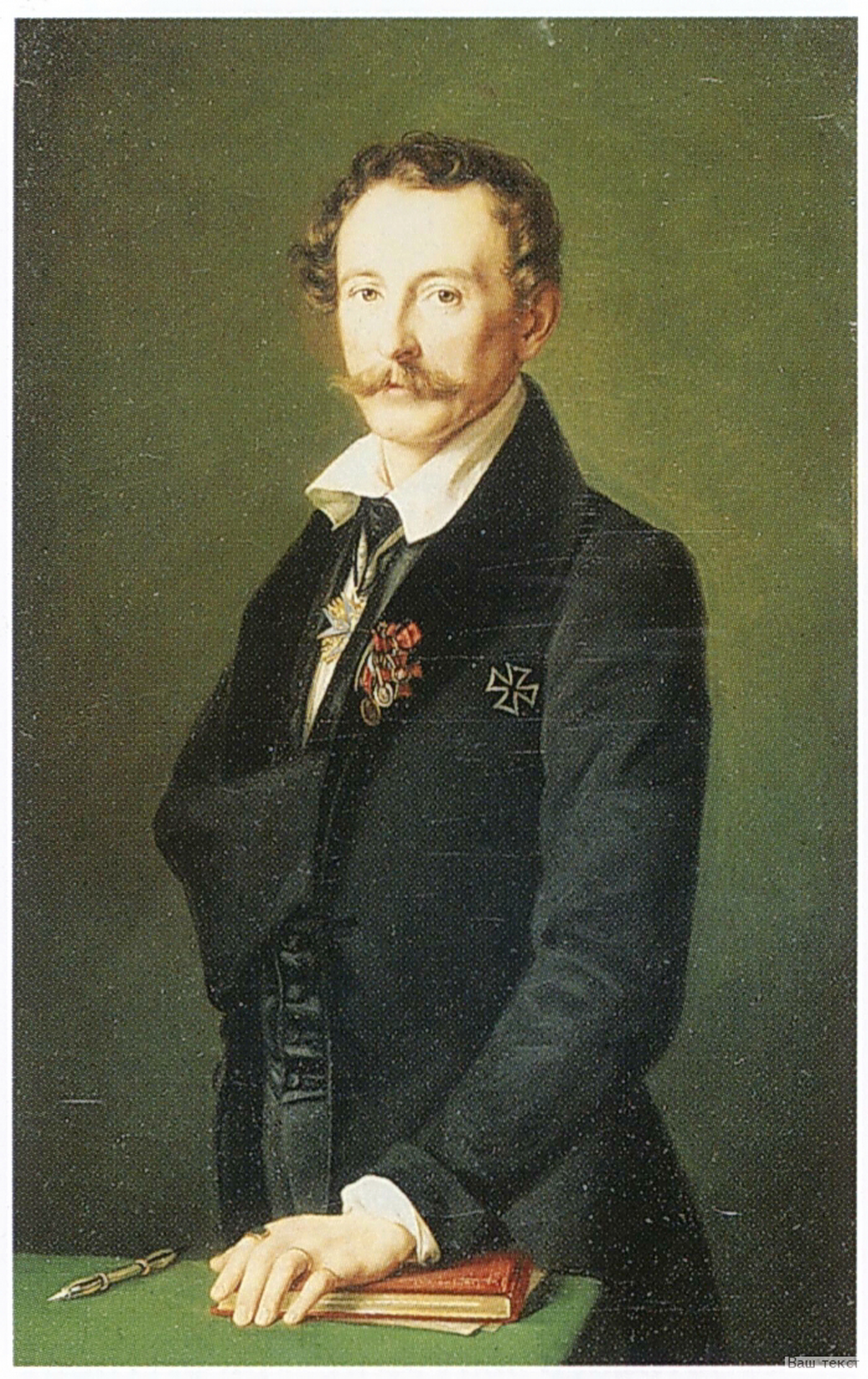
Gerhardt Wilhelm von Reutern (1838)
