= Maximilien de Meuron =

Swiss painter (1785–1868)

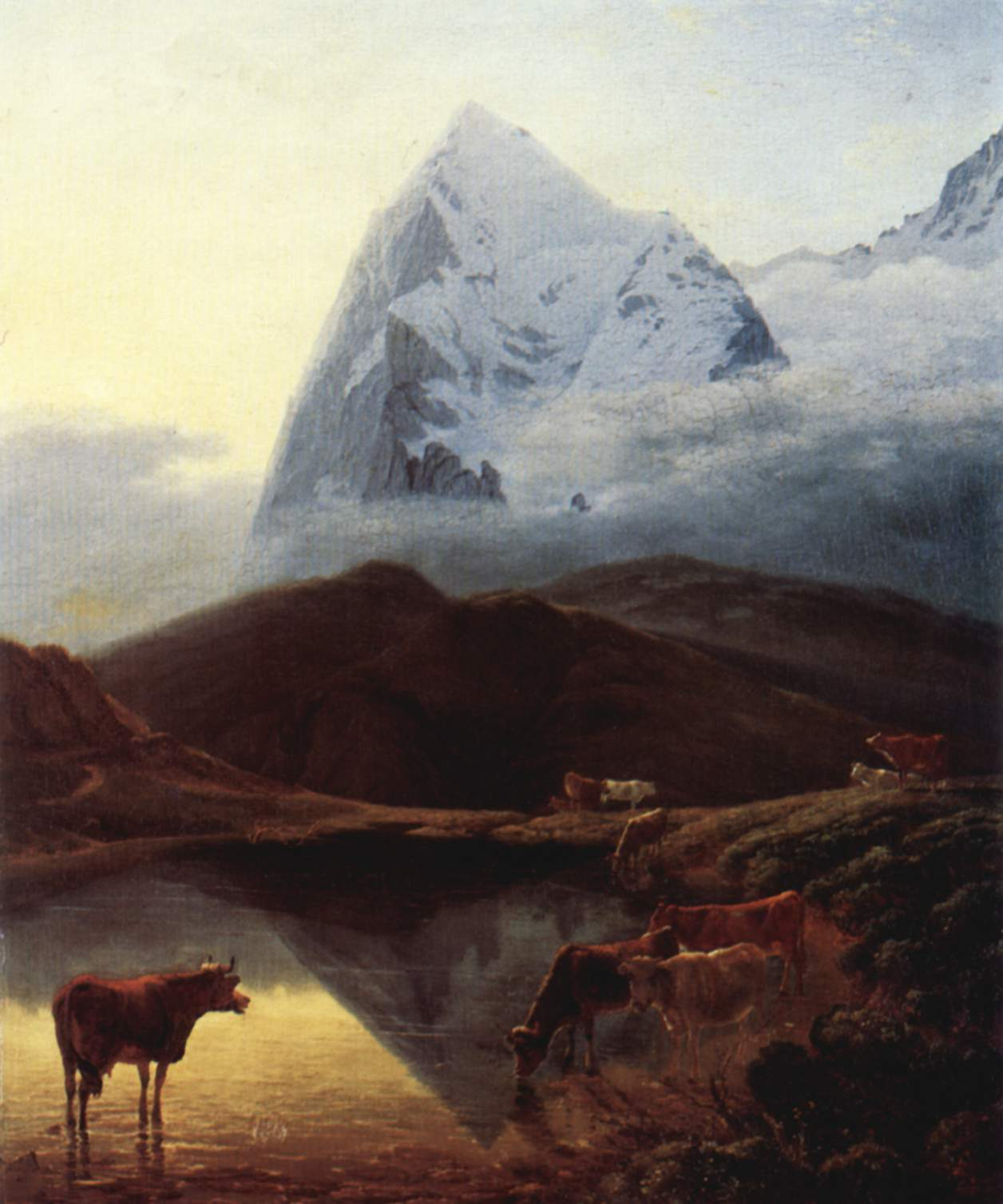
The Eiger from the Wengernalp

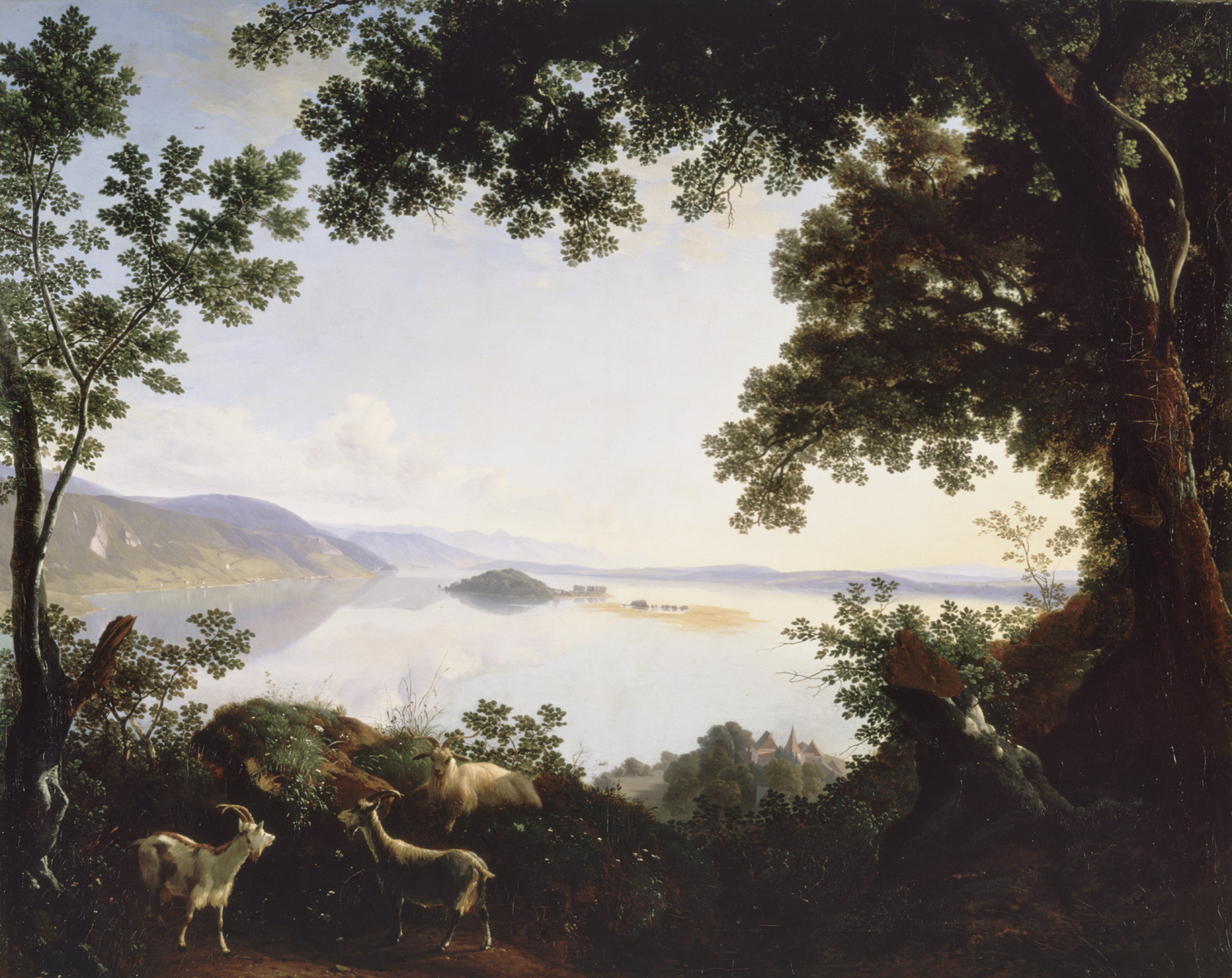
View of the Île de Saint-Pierre

Maximilien de Meuron (8 September 1785, Corcelles-près-Concise - 27 February 1868, Neuchâtel) was a Swiss landscape painter in the Romantic style.

== Biography ==
He was born to an aristocratic family. His first art lessons came from a Piedmontese artist named Matthieu Ricco in Neuchâtel. Later, he studied with Alexandre and Abraham Girardet. He originally intended to pursue a diplomatic career and studied law in Berlin, but continued his studies with the landscape painter, Janus Genelli.

He returned home in 1803 and took a position with the Department of Foreign Affairs, but gave it up in 1808 to go to Paris. There he studied the Baroque art of Claude Lorrain und Nicolas Poussin. The following year, he and his friend, Gabriel Lory visited Italy. Once again home, in 1812, he began organizing a project to establish a "National Museum", setting up a subscription campaign, petitioning the legislature to provide a building, and donating some of his own works to start the collection.

He spent 1818 and 1819 in the Bernese Highlands to paint mountain landscapes. In 1822, he held a showing at the Salon in Paris. The following year. he was elected to the Grand Conseil (legislature) of the Canton of Neuchâtel. In 1824, he participated in an exhibition at the Academy of Arts, Berlin, where some of his works were bought by King Friedrich Wilhelm. In 1825, he became an honorary member of the Academy, but declined the offer of a professorship.

In 1826, he organized the first exhibition of "objets d’art et d’industrie", which would be held again in 1828 and 1830. Following the suicide of Louis Léopold Robert (whom he had been financially supporting) in 1835, he organized a major retrospective of Robert's works.

Depressed after his eldest son, Maximilien, died unexpectedly, he gave up painting until 1842, when he did some sketching in Italy. He never went back to his previous habits, however, and spent the remainder of his life primarily involved in organizing exhibitions and promoting local artists.

A portrait bust of Meuron, created by Ferdinand Schlöth in 1856, may be seen at the Musée d’art et d’histoire. The Archives de l'État de Neuchâtel has an extensive collection of his correspondence. The painter, Albert de Meuron, was his youngest son.

== Archive sources ==
- MEURON MAXIMILIEN DE, Fonds: Maximilien de Meuron (1723-1950). Archives de l'État de Neuchâtel.
