= Karl Girardet =

Swiss / French painter (1813–1871)

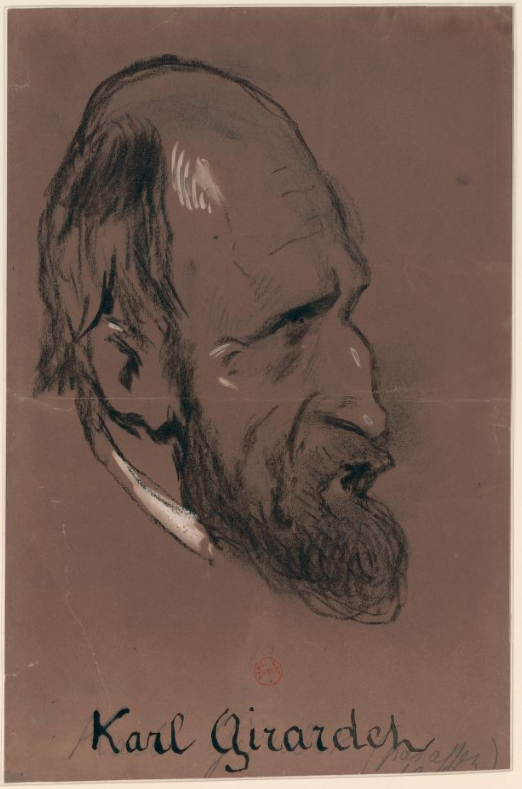
Caricature of Girardet by Nadar, 1850s

Karl Girardet (born Charles Girardet; 7 May 1813, in Le Locle – 24 April 1871, in Versailles) was a Swiss painter and illustrator, who lived and worked mostly in Paris. After beginning his career as a landscape painter, he became a renowned history painter as well as a confidant to King Louis Philippe I and an official court painter.

== Life ==
Girardet was born on 7 May 1813 in Le Locle, now in the canton of Neuchâtel, Switzerland, as the eldest son of engraver Charles Samuel Girardet, His brothers Paul and Édouard also became artists. After 1822, he lived in Paris, where he studied painting with Léon Cogniet, and began his career as a genre painter.

On a study trip to Switzerland in 1833–35, he made the acquaintance of the aristocratic painter Maximilien de Meuron, by whose influence he obtained commissions for two panoramas of Lausanne. In 1836, he presented his first exhibits in the Salon of Paris and started working as a copyist for the French royal court.

An alpine landscape presented at the 1837 Salon obtained him a first distinction, and he successfully collaborated with Cogniet on two great battle scenes exhibited at Versailles. He embarked on travels across Europe, filling his sketchbook with landscapes in Düsseldorf (1838), Tyrol and Croatia (1839), and Italy (1840). A painting of a protestant assembly at Neuchatêl, Assemblée de Protestants surprise par des troupes catholiques (1839–42), earned him another distinction at the Salon of 1842 and regular commissions by the Neuchâtel Friends of Art.

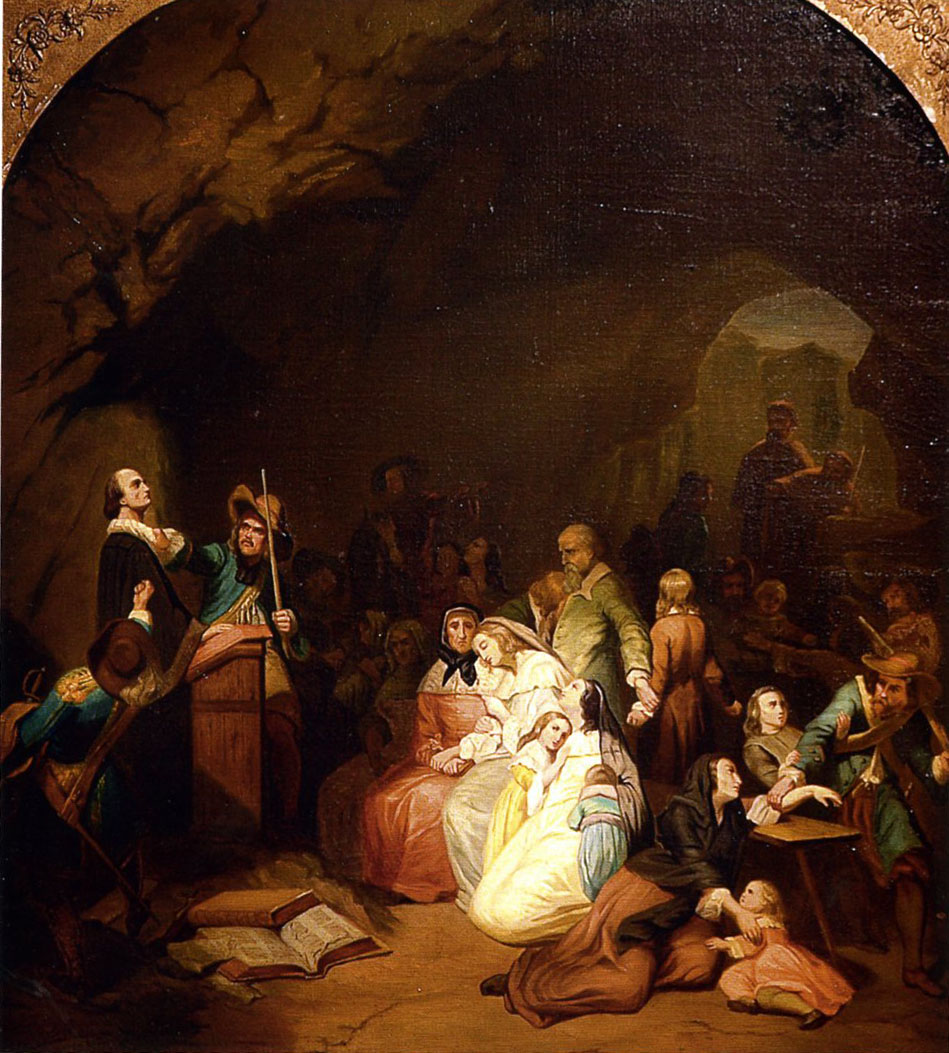
Karl Girardet, Assemblée de Protestants surprise par des troupes catholiques (1842)

In 1839, Girardet illustrated his first book, Roland furieux, followed by Jardin des plantes by Boitard in 1842. After a six-month stay in Egypt, 1844, he continued illustrating works including Thiers's famous Histoire du Consulat et de l'Empire, and completed several royal commissions for paintings of state occasions. Following the fall of the monarchy in February 1848, Girardet left France and moved into his brother Édouard's home in Brienz, Switzerland. In 1850, he returned to France to illustrate a great work edited by Alfred Mame about the history and the monuments of the Touraine. This work obtained a first-class medal at the Exposition Universelle of 1855, and earned Girardet many more commissions by Mame, notably for children's books and pious works.

In 1857, he moved his studio to the Montmartre quarter, where he would live until his death, and was admitted as a member of the Royal Academy of Amsterdam. He continued to embark on study trips, such as to the Valais (1858–1860), Italy (1861–1862) and Brunnen (1869). In 1870, caught in besieged Paris during the Prussian invasion of France, Girardet damaged his eyesight while sketching the Prussian positions. Seized by anguish, fearing blindness, he died, alone in his apartment, of suffocation. He was unmarried, but had lived for many years with the painter Augustine Angelina Kaas, for whom he had provided a pension. His family inherited the remainder of his estate, some 100,000 francs.

== Works ==
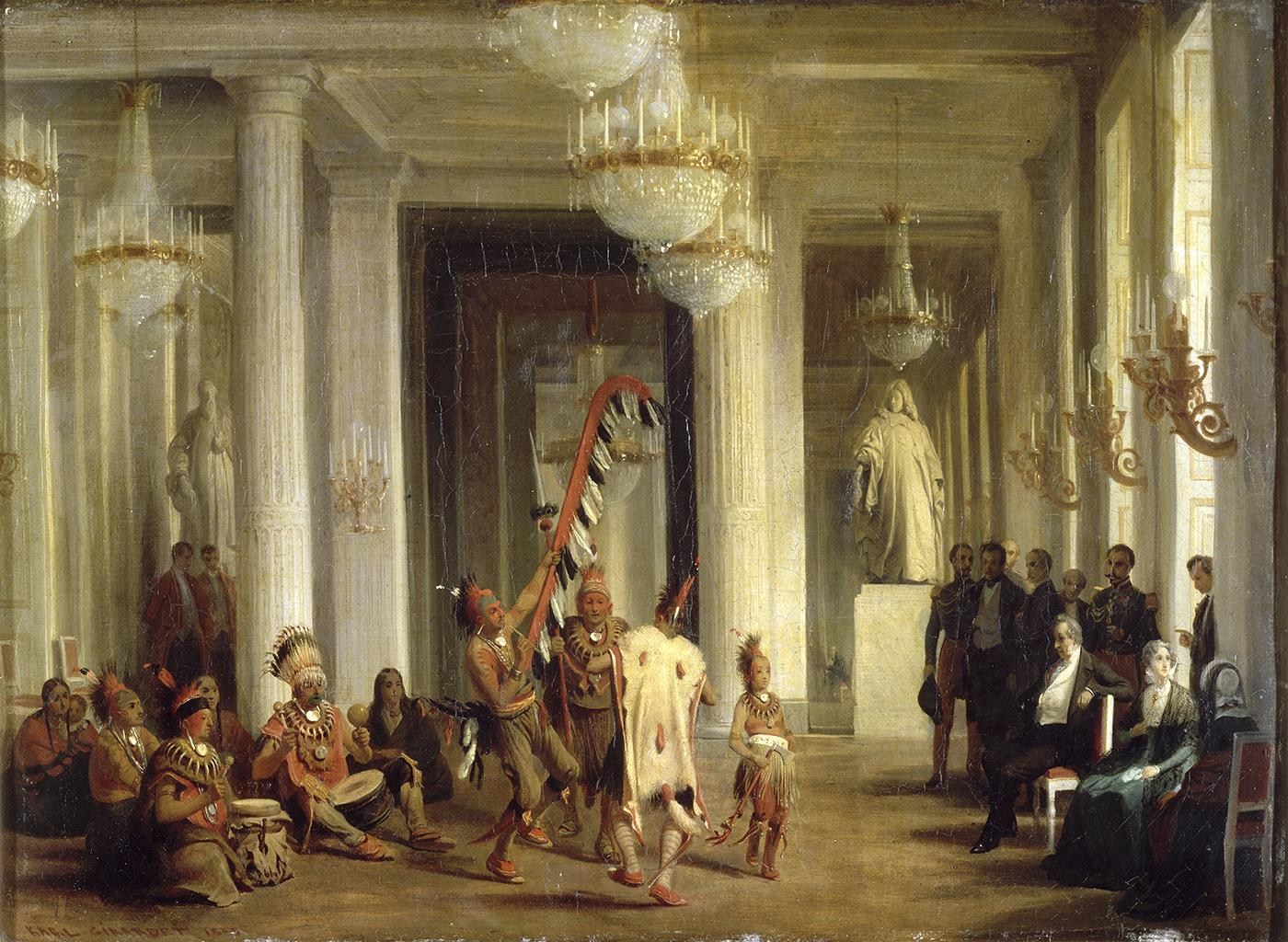
The Reception of George Catlin's Indian Museum, one of Girardet's works as court painter.

Girardet's art belongs to the tradition of Romanticism and to the popular movement in landscape painting called the "School of 1830". His landscapes, based on sketches often completed under adverse weather conditions and within one hour, exhibit a rare vivacity and mastery of subtle color, especially after his 1850 stay in Brienz. Unlike his friends and colleagues Maximilien de Meuron and Rodolphe Töpffer, he was not enchanted by the snow-capped peaks of the Alps, preferring instead to portray lakes, streams and marshes, notably the rivers Aar, Eure and Marne.

Girardet sought official recognition through his historical paintings. Of these, his Assemblée de Protestants was his most lasting success; its pathos and deliberate composition are reminiscent of Paul Delaroche's work. Later in his life, deprived of royal patronage by the political upheavals in France, his historical paintings met with little success, and he shifted his attention back to landscape painting, which he continued to exhibit in the Salon until the end of his life.

As a man of modest means, Girardet had little leisure to devote to his art and was compelled to earn money mainly as an illustrator. On his many voyages, he drew small ethnographical reports for the illustrated press; these and the illustrations he drew for luxury albums nourished his visual imagination. After 1855, he abandoned the Orientalist themes that had contributed to his success; and in his late period, as a diligent craftsman, he dedicated himself to the themes and formats in vogue with his bourgeois clients.

Girardet's success inspired many other French-speaking Swiss artists, and it helped Swiss art and Swiss landscapes gain recognition with a broad international public. Many of his works are exhibited in the Musée d'art et d'histoire of Neuchâtel and in the Musée national de Versailles.
