= Adelheid von Stolterfoth =

German poet (1800–1875)

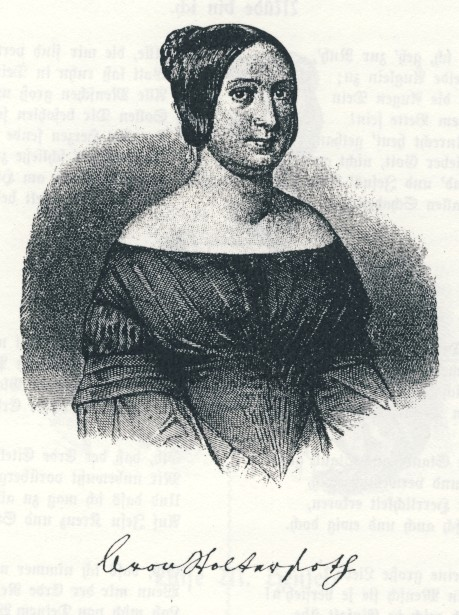
- Adelheid von Stolterfoth
- Born: Adelheid Karoline Wilhelmine Julie von Stolterfoth; 11 September 1800; Eisenach
- Died: 17 December 1875 (75 years old); Wiesbaden
- Years active: 1925-1842

Adelheid Karoline Wilhelmine Julie von Stolterfoth (11 September 1800 in Eisenach – 17 December 1875 in Wiesbaden) was a German poet.

== Life ==
Adelheid von Stolterfoth was the daughter of Gottfried von Stolterforth and Caroline von Stolterforth, née Schott von Schottenstein. Adelheid von Solterfoth grew up in Erlangen, Bavaria. In 1816 she and her mother relocated closer towards the Rhine: first to Bingen and then to Winkel (Rheingau). Following the death of her mother in 1825, she moved inwith the family of her uncle, Parliamentary President Hans Carl Freiherr von Zwierlein, whom she married on 14 February 1844. She accompanied the Zwierlein (royal family) on their trip through England (1827), Switzerland, and Upper Italy (1828). She and her sister would go on to travel through Tyrol in 1840, and Holland and Belgium in 1841 as well. Following the death of her husband in 1850, she began to live interchangeably in Winkel, Eltville; Frankfurt am Main; and lastly in Wiesbaden.

Adelheid von Stolterfoth was well known for her poetry about the Rhine area and was a proponent of Rhine romanticism with her works: "Rheinischer Sagenkreis" (romances, ballads, and legends), 1835; Rheinische Lieder und Sagen, 1839, 4. ed. 1859; Rheinisches Album oder: Der Rheingau mit dem Wispertale und den Nachbarstädten Mainz und Wiesbaden, 1836; Burg Stolzenfels (epic poem), 1842.

== Works ==
- Zoraide (1825)
- Alfred (1834)
- Rheinischer Sagenkreis. Ein Cyclus von Romanzen, Balladen und Legenden des Rheins. - Frankfurt a./M : Jügel, 1835. Digitalisierte Ausgabe der Universitäts- und Landesbibliothek Düsseldorf
- The Rhenish minstrel. A Series of Ballads, Traditional and Legendary, of the Rhine. - Frankfort o/M : Jugel, 1835. Digitalised copy from the University and National Library of Düsseldorf.
- Rheinisches Album (1838)
- Rheinische Lieder und Sagen (1839)
- Alfred: Romantisch-episches Gedicht in 8 Gesängen (1840)
- Malerische Beschreibung von Wiesbaden und der Umgegend (1841)
- Burg Stolzenfels (1842)
