= Edouard Girardet =

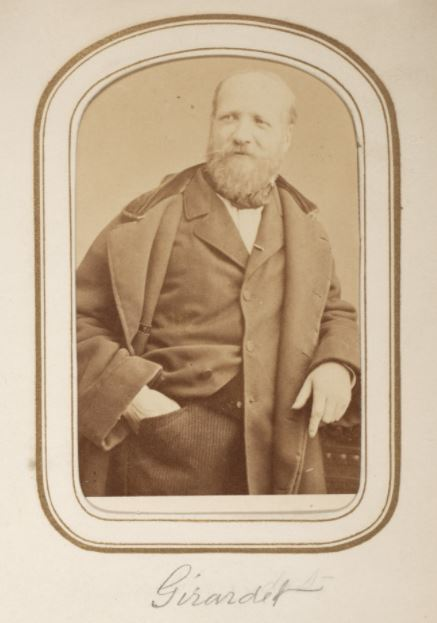
Edouard Girardet (visiting card, 1856)

Edouard-Henri Girardet (21 July 1819, Le Locle - 5 March 1880, Versailles) was a Swiss-born French painter and engraver.

== Life and work ==
He was born to the engraver, Charles Samuel Girardet. His brothers, Paul and Karl, also became engravers and painters, as did his sons, Henri, Pierre (1850–1884), Robert (1851–1900) and Max (1857–1927).

In 1822, his family moved to Paris. He was already involved in woodcutting around 1828. Three years later, he took classes in ornamental sculpting at the "École Royale Gratuite de Dessin" in Paris. From 1836, he worked on creating drawings for Les Galeries Historiques de Versailles, by Charles Gavard. During this time, he took painting lessons from his brother, Karl.

In 1839, he went back to Switzerland, where he created scenes from the Bernese Oberland; the first in a long series of rural genre paintings. In 1842, he and Karl took trip to Egypt, where he produced some Orientalist works. Following their trip, he went to live in Brienz, and was married there in 1845.

His family grew rather large so, to secure their livelihood, from 1855 he was engaged in making reproductive engravings for the French art dealer and publisher, Adolphe Goupil; a commission which had been secured through Karl's mediation. In 1857, he went back to Paris, where he focused on engravings of works by well-known artists, including Paul Delaroche, Horace Vernet and Jean-Léon Gérôme.

In 1866, he was made a Knight in the Legion of Honor. During the Franco-Prussian War, he lived in Brienz. Beginning in the mid-1870s, he took up painting again, and made lengthy trips to Brittany, Italy and North Africa, to provide himself with motifs.

== Selected paintings ==
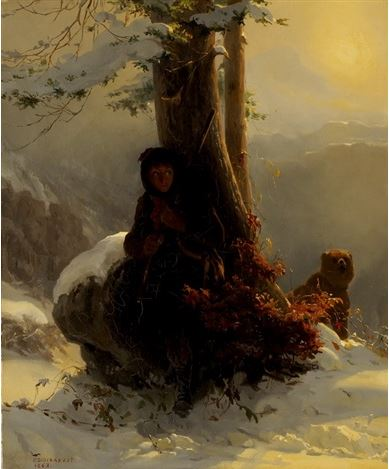
Bear Hunting

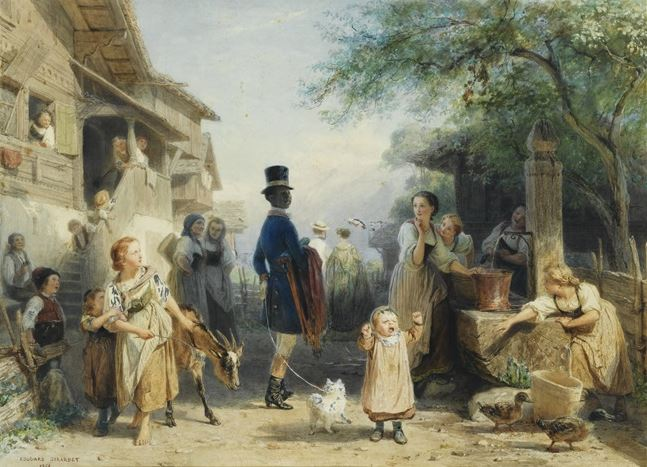
A Lively Village Scene

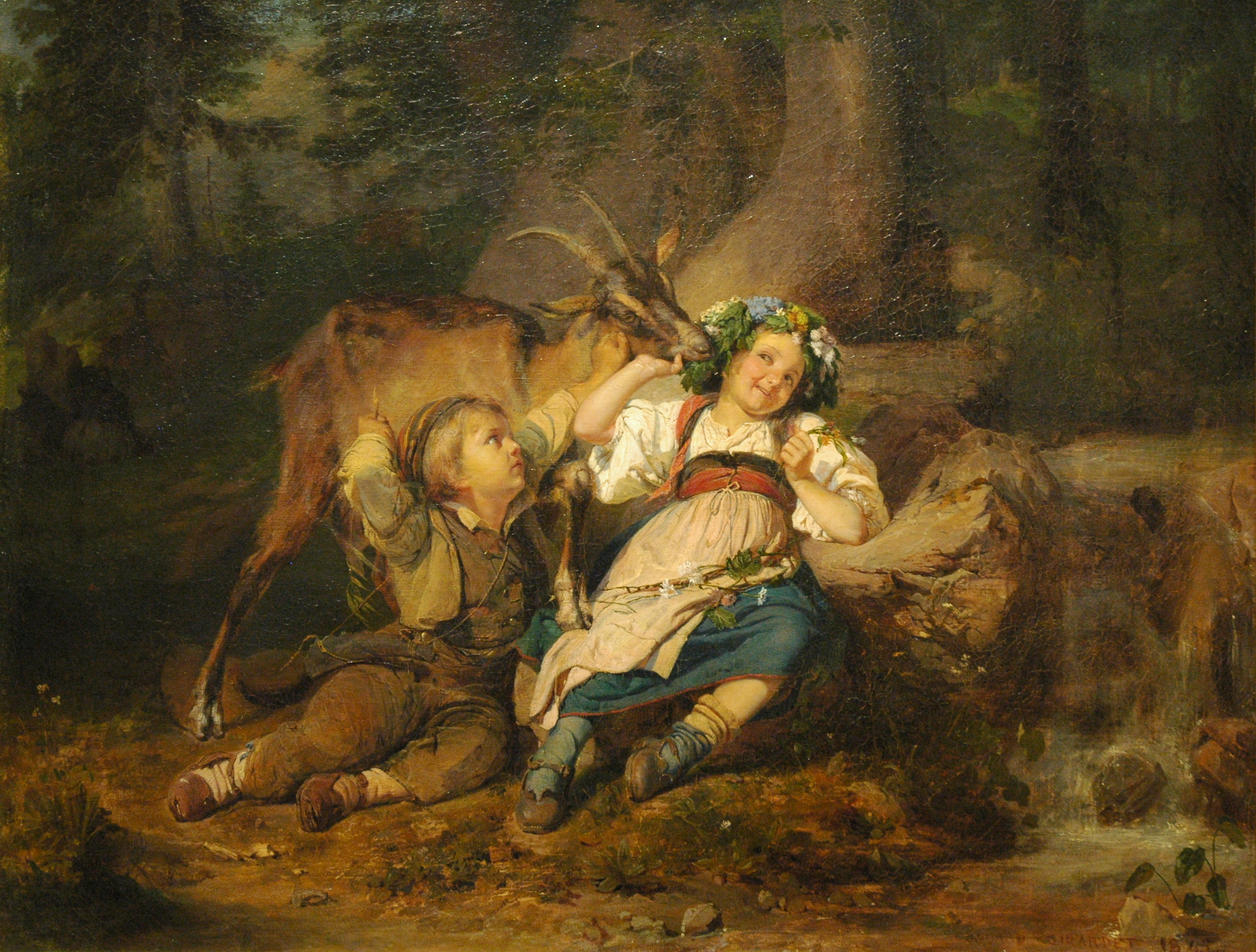
The Defender of the Crown

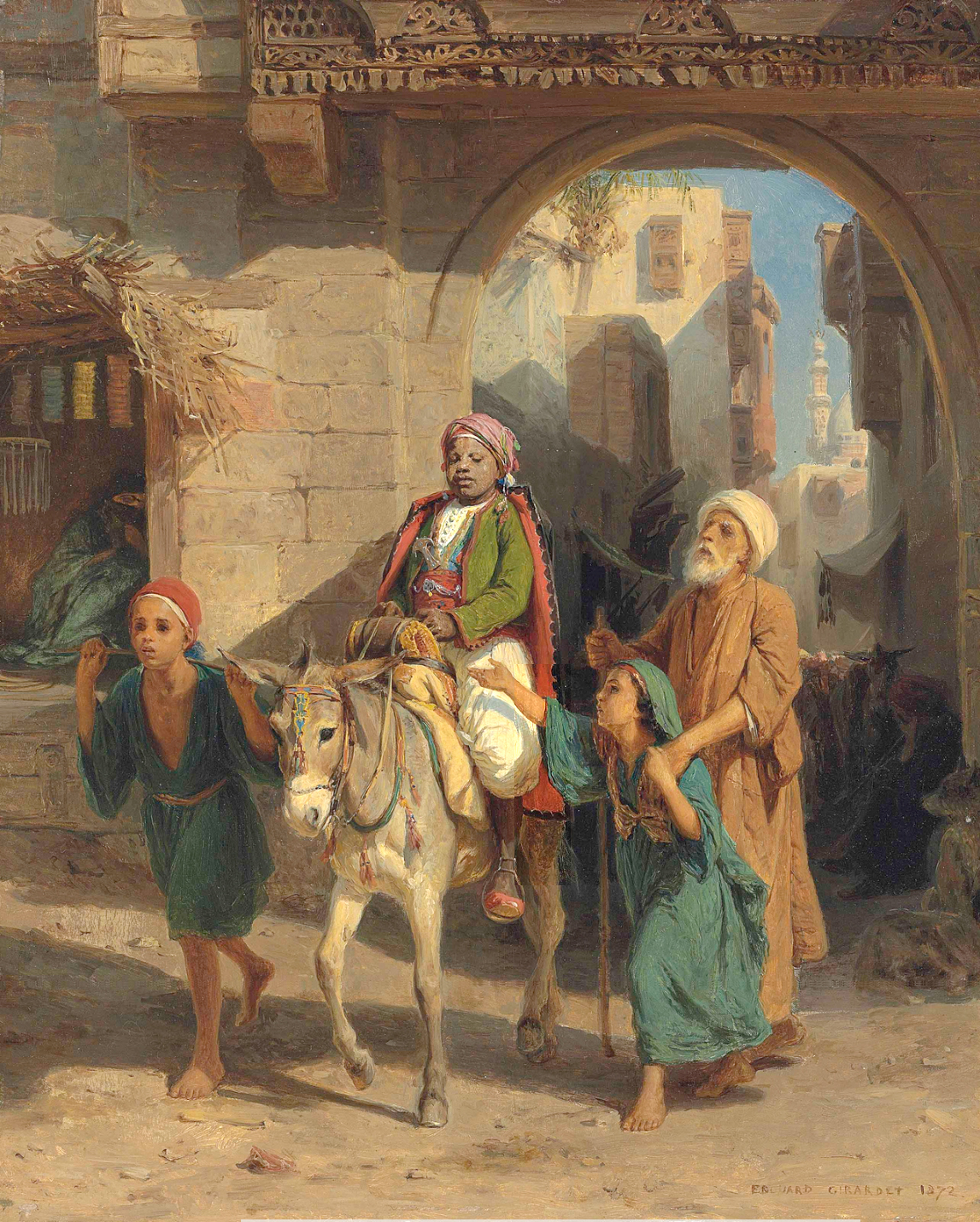
Entering the City

== Sources ==
- M.Tripet: "Girardet, Édouard". In: Carl Brun (Ed.): Schweizerisches Künstler-Lexikon, Vol.1: A–G. Huber & Co., Frauenfeld 1905, pg.583 (Online)
- "Girardet, Edouard". In: Ulrich Thieme, Fred. C. Willis (Eds.): Allgemeines Lexikon der Bildenden Künstler von der Antike bis zur Gegenwart, Vol.14: Giddens–Gress. E. A. Seemann, Leipzig 1921, pg.165 (Online)
- (in German) Sylvain Bauhofer, Renate Treydel: Girardet, Edouard. In: Allgemeines Künstlerlexikon. Die Bildenden Künstler aller Zeiten und Völker (AKL). Band 55, Saur, München u. a. 2007, ISBN 978-3-598-22795-0, S. 184
