= Newcastle =

Newcastle usually refers to:

- Newcastle upon Tyne, a city and metropolitan borough in Tyne and Wear, England, UK
- Newcastle-under-Lyme, a town in Staffordshire, England, UK
- Newcastle, New South Wales, a metropolitan area in New South Wales, Australia, named after Newcastle upon Tyne

Newcastle, New Castle or New Cassel may also refer to:

== Places ==
=== Australia ===
- City of Newcastle, a local government area in New South Wales
- County of Newcastle, a cadastral unit in South Australia
- Division of Newcastle, a federal electoral division in New South Wales
- Electoral district of Newcastle, an electoral district of the New South Wales Legislative Assembly
- Electoral district of Newcastle (South Australia) 1884–1902, 1915–1956 in the South Australian House of Assembly
- Newcastle, New South Wales, a city in New South Wales
- Newcastle Waters, a town and locality in the Northern Territory
- Newcastle West, New South Wales, inner suburb of the city
- Toodyay, Western Australia, known as Newcastle until 1910

=== Canada ===
- Newcastle, Alberta, a former village now within the Town of Drumheller
- Newcastle, New Brunswick, a former town, now part of Miramichi
- Newcastle, Ontario, a community in the Municipality of Clarington in Durham Region
- Newcastle District, a historic district in Upper Canada which existed until 1849
- Newcastle Parish, New Brunswick
- Newcastle (electoral district), a provincial electoral district in the Canadian province of British Columbia

=== Republic of Ireland ===
- Newcastle, Clonfad, a townland in Clonfad civil parish, barony of Fartullagh, County Westmeath
- Newcastle, County Tipperary
- Newcastle, County Wicklow
- Newcastle, County Dublin
- Newcastle, Kilcleagh, a townland in Kilcleagh civil parish, barony of Clonlonan, County Westmeath
- Newcastle, Lickbla, a townland in Lickbla civil parish, barony of Fore, County Westmeath
- Newcastle West, County Limerick

=== Jamaica ===
- Newcastle, Jamaica

=== Saint Kitts and Nevis ===
- Newcastle, Saint Kitts and Nevis

=== South Africa ===
- Newcastle, KwaZulu-Natal, a city in northern KwaZulu-Natal
- Newcastle Local Municipality, administrative area in the Amajuba district in KwaZulu-Natal

=== United Kingdom ===
==== England ====
- Newcastle, Shropshire (Newcastle on Clun), a village (and parish) in south Shropshire
- Newcastle-under-Lyme, the principal town of the Borough of Newcastle-under-Lyme, Staffordshire
  - Borough of Newcastle-under-Lyme, a local government district with borough status in Staffordshire
  - Newcastle-under-Lyme (UK Parliament constituency), a constituency represented in the House of Commons
  - Newcastle-under-Lyme Rural District, a rural district in the county of Staffordshire
- Newcastle upon Tyne, a city in Tyne and Wear
  - Newcastle-upon-Tyne (UK Parliament constituency), a former borough constituency in the county of Northumberland

==== Northern Ireland ====
- Newcastle, County Down, a small town in County Down lying at the foot of the Mourne Mountains

==== Wales ====
- Newcastle, Monmouthshire
- Newcastle, Bridgend, an area and electoral ward
- Newcastle Emlyn, Carmarthenshire

=== United States ===
- New Castle, Alabama, an unincorporated community in Jefferson County
- Newcastle, California, an unincorporated community in Placer County
- New Castle, Colorado, a home rule municipality in Garfield County
- New Castle, Delaware, a city in New Castle County
- New Castle County, Delaware, the northernmost of Delaware's three counties
- New Castle Hundred, an unincorporated subdivision of New Castle County, Delaware
- New Castle, Indiana, a city in Henry County
- Webster City, Iowa, formerly Newcastle, county seat of Hamilton County
- New Castle, Kentucky, a city in Henry County
- Newcastle, Maine, a town in Lincoln County
  - Newcastle (CDP), Maine, the main village in the town
- Newcastle, Nebraska, a village in Dixon County
- Newcastle Township, Dixon County, Nebraska, a township in Dixon County
- New Castle, New Hampshire, a town in Rockingham County
- New Cassel, New York, an unincorporated place in Nassau County
- New Castle, New York, a town in Westchester County
- New Castle, Ohio, an unincorporated community in Belmont County
- Newcastle, Ohio, an unincorporated community in Coshocton County
- Newcastle Township, Coshocton County, Ohio, a township in Coshocton County
- Newcastle, Oklahoma, the largest city in McClain County
- New Castle, Pennsylvania, a city in Lawrence County
- New Castle Northwest, Pennsylvania, a census-designated place in Lawrence County
- New Castle Township, Pennsylvania, a township in Schuylkill County
- South New Castle, Pennsylvania, a borough in Lawrence County
- Newcastle, Texas, a city in Young County
- Newcastle, Utah, an unincorporated community in Iron County
- New Castle, Virginia, the only town in Craig County
- Newcastle, Washington, a city in King County
- New Cassel, Wisconsin, a former village in Fond du Lac County
- Newcastle, Wyoming, a city in Weston County

== Arts and entertainment ==
- Newcastle (film), a 2008 Australian film
- Newcastle Publishing Company, a Southern California-based small trade paperback publisher
- "Newcastle" (The Architecture the Railways Built), a 2021 television episode
- Newcastle, a playable character in the game Apex Legends

== Buildings and facilities ==
- Newcastle Castle, Bridgend, a medieval castle in Wales
- New Castle Correctional Facility, a prison in New Castle, Indiana
- New Palace (Stuttgart) (Das Neues Schloss, sometimes translated as the "New Castle"), a palace in Stuttgart, Germany

== Sport ==
=== Football clubs ===
- Newcastle Jets FC, an Australian association football club in Newcastle, NSW
- Newcastle United F.C., an English association football club based in Newcastle upon Tyne
- Newcastle Red Bulls, an English rugby union club based in Newcastle upon Tyne
- Newcastle Knights, an Australian rugby league team based in Newcastle, New South Wales
- Newcastle Thunder, an English rugby league club based in Newcastle upon Tyne

=== Other sporting uses ===
- Newcastle Eagles, the most successful team in the history of the British Basketball League (BBL)

== Transportation ==
=== Air ===
- Newcastle Airport (disambiguation), several airports of this name
- Newcastle International Airport, airport of Newcastle-upon-Tyne, England
- New Castle Airport, a public airport in an unincorporated part of New Castle County, Delaware, US

=== Rail ===
- New Castle District, a railroad line owned and operated by the Norfolk Southern Railway in Ohio and Indiana, US
- Newcastle railway line, New South Wales, Australia, running from Broadmeadow

=== Watercraft ===
- HMAS Newcastle, an Adelaide class frigate of the Royal Australian Navy
- HMS Newcastle, a name given to eight ships of the British Royal Navy
- Newcastle (clipper), 1857 English ship

== Other uses ==
- Duke of Newcastle, a title in the UK
- Newcastle Building Society, a British financial institution
- Newcastle, an Athlon 64 computer processor core revision

== See also ==
- Akhaltsikhe ("New Castle"), Georgia
- Castelnau (disambiguation) ("New Castle"), places in Occitan-speaking areas
- Castelnuovo (disambiguation) ("New Castle"), places in Italian-speaking areas
- Châteauneuf (disambiguation) ("New Castle"), places in French-speaking areas
- Herceg Novi ("New Castle"), Montenegro (formerly Italian Castelnuovo)
- Jaunpils ("New Castle"), Latvia
- Kaštel Novi ("New Castle"), Croatia
- Kota Bharu ("New Castle"), Malaysia
- Neuburg (disambiguation) ("New castle"), places in German-speaking areas
- Neuchâtel (disambiguation) ("New castle"), places in French-speaking areas
- Neufchâtel (disambiguation) ("New castle"), places in French-speaking areas
- Newport, Wales, Casnewydd-ar-Wysg ("New castle-on-Usk") in Welsh
- Nové Zámky ("New Castle"), Slovakia
- Nowy Zamek ("New Castle"), Poland (formerly German Neuschloß)
- Nyborg ("New Castle"), Denmark
- Qaleh Now (disambiguation) ("New Castle"), places in Persian-speaking areas
- Shinshiro ("New Castle"), Japan
- Tazeh Qaleh (disambiguation) ("New Castle"), places in Azeri- and Turkmen-speaking areas
