= Castelnau =

Castelnau may refer to:

== Places ==
=== France ===
Castelnau or Castelnaud (castel 'castle' and nau 'new' in Occitan) is part of the name of several communes in the south of France:

- Castelnau-Barbarens, in the Gers département
- Castelnau-Chalosse, in the Landes département
- Castelnau-d'Anglès, in the Gers département
- Castelnau-d'Arbieu, in the Gers département
- Castelnau-d'Aude, in the Aude département
- Castelnau-d'Auzan, in the Gers département
- Castelnau-d'Estrétefonds, in the Haute-Garonne département
- Castelnau-de-Brassac, in the Tarn département
- Castelnau-de-Guers, in the Hérault département
- Castelnau-de-Lévis, in the Tarn département
- Castelnau-de-Mandailles, in the Aveyron département
- Castelnau-de-Médoc, in the Gironde département
- Castelnau-de-Montmiral, in the Tarn département
- Castelnau-Durban, in the Ariège département
- Castelnau-le-Lez, in the Hérault département
- Castelnau-Magnoac, in the Hautes-Pyrénées département
- Castelnau-Montratier, commune in the Lot département
- Castelnau-Montratier (delegated commune), delegated commune in the Lot département
- Castelnau-Pégayrols, in the Aveyron département
- Castelnau-Picampeau, in the Haute-Garonne département
- Castelnau-Rivière-Basse, in the Hautes-Pyrénées département
- Castelnau-sur-Gupie, in the Lot-et-Garonne département
- Castelnau-sur-l'Auvignon, in the Gers département
- Castelnau-Tursan, in the Landes département
- Castelnau-Valence, in the Gard département
- Castelnaud-de-Gratecambe, in the Lot-et-Garonne département
- Castelnaud-la-Chapelle, in the Dordogne département
- Saint-Michel-de-Castelnau, in the Gironde département

=== England ===
- Castelnau, London, an estate and road in Barnes, south-west London

=== Canada ===
- De Castelnau station, a Montreal Metro station in the Villeray–Saint-Michel–Parc-Extension borough
- Castelnau Lake, a freshwater body of the catchment area of the rivière à la Chasse in Baie-Comeau, Quebec

== People ==
- Michel de Castelnau, sieur de la Mauvissière (c. 1520–1592), French diplomat and soldier
- Emmanuel Boileau de Castelnau (1857-1923), French mountain climber
- François-Louis Laporte, comte de Castelnau (1810–1880), French naturalist
- Noël Édouard, vicomte de Curières de Castelnau (1851–1944), French general

== See also ==
- Château de Castelnau-Bretenoux, a castle in the commune of Prudhomat, Lot département, France
- Châteauneuf (disambiguation)
- Neufchâtel (disambiguation)
- Neuchâtel
- Newcastle (disambiguation)
- Neuburg (disambiguation)
