= Abbey of Baume-les-Dames =

French abbey

Sainte-Odile Abbey in Baume-les-Dames
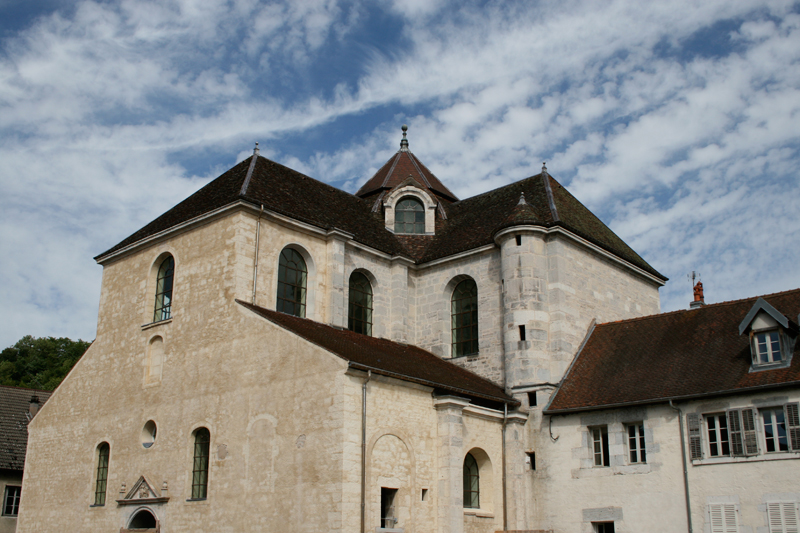
- Sainte-Odile Abbey in Baume-les-Dames
- Interactive map of Sainte-Odile Abbey in Baume-les-Dames

Monastery information
- Order: Benedictines
- Established: 8th century
- Disestablished: 1791
- Diocese: Archdiocese of Besançon

People
- Founders: Germain de Besançon

Architecture
- Heritage designation: Listed as a historic monument (1886, Abbey church); Listed as a historic monument (2007, Facades, roofs, ruins)

Site
- Location: Baume-les-Dames
- Country: France
- Coordinates: 47°21′08″N 6°21′44″E

The Abbey of Baume-les-Dames, also known as Sainte-Odile Abbey, is a Benedictine abbey located in the municipality of Baume-les-Dames, in the Doubs department of France.

Originally known as Palma or Palmense Monasterium, the abbey is traditionally thought to have been founded in Late Antiquity, either in the 4th century by Saint Germain, Archbishop of Besançon, or at the end of the 6th century by Garnier, mayor of the palace of the County of Burgundy. It is dedicated to Saint Odile (c. 660–720), who, according to tradition, took refuge there and recovered her sight. The abbey complex was rebuilt in the 18th century.

== Legend ==
According to regional tradition and a compilation formerly preserved at the abbey, Saint Germain was beheaded in 396 at Grand-Fontaine by Arians and is said to have carried his head to Baume-les-Dames, where he had founded an abbey that subsequently became the place of his burial.

Another legend concerns King Guntram of Burgundy. After a long hunting expedition in which Garnier had taken part, the king is said to have fallen asleep and had a dream. In this dream, he saw a weasel attempting to cross a river, when an iron bridge appeared, allowing the animal to cross and enter a cave containing a large treasure. Upon awakening, the king reportedly recounted the dream to Garnier, who explained that, while the king was sleeping, he had helped a weasel cross a stream by laying his sword across the watercourse. The animal then crossed this improvised bridge and disappeared into a hole at some distance from the spring. Following this account, the two men are said to have dug at the indicated location, later known as Vigne-du-Trésor, where they discovered a substantial treasure. According to the tradition, the king allocated this treasure to the reconstruction of the Abbey of Baume-les-Dames, which had been heavily damaged during the Hun invasion of 451, after witnessing a cloud rise from the ruins of the abbey from which emerged a hand with outstretched fingers, the palm turned toward him.

== First mention ==
The abbey is mentioned in La Vie de saint Ermenfroy, written around 720–730, and in the testament of Anségise, abbot of Luxeuil and later of Fontenelle, dated 831. It also appears in the writings of the 11th-century monk Raoul Glaber of Saint-Germain d’Auxerre, who recounts that the monks of Glanseuil, fleeing Norman incursions, transported the relics of Saint Maur until they reached the Abbey of Baume, where they settled. The abbey also housed the tomb of Count Garnier. This tomb was opened in 1768 at the request of the abbess, revealing very ancient remains. It was destroyed during the French Revolution; some fragments were reused at the Château of Esnans, while the bones were transferred to the cemetery of Cour-les-Dames. The Abbey of Baume-les-Dames held significant importance during the reigns of Charlemagne and Louis the Pious and is mentioned in their capitularies.

== Saint Odile ==
According to tradition, a miracle in the 7th century contributed to the renown of the abbey. Odile of Hohenbourg, daughter of the Duke of Alsace and born blind, was hidden there by her mother to protect her from her father. Cared for by the abbey’s abbesses, she was baptized at the age of thirteen and received the name Odile, interpreted as meaning “child of light.” During her baptism, she is said to have regained her sight, a miracle that subsequently enhanced the reputation of the Abbey of Baume-les-Dames and attracted pilgrims.

== Abbesses ==
=== Angélique-Henriette d’Amas ===
The present abbey church was constructed between 1738 and 1760 in a Neo-Romanesque style, to the designs of the Besançon architect Nicolas Nicole, under the abbacy of Madame d’Amas. Construction was interrupted in 1760 due to a lack of funds, resulting in the building being closed off by a wall. The original project planned a church 44 meters in length with a porch tower; only the choir was completed, rising to a height of 24 meters.

Today, the abbey church is the sole surviving element of the former abbey complex, which originally also included a courtyard and conventual buildings.

The interior was decorated with columns of white marble and pink marble from Sampans. The altar was made of Italian marble, and the floor was paved with slabs of various colored stones. The furnishings were of high quality, including a lectern designed by Nicolas Nicole, later transferred to the church.

The abbey was led by an abbess and a chapter of fifteen canonesses. The abbess and the canonesses were required to demonstrate eight quarters of paternal and maternal nobility, corresponding to four generations of noble ancestry, and to take vows of chastity, poverty, and obedience. The nuns followed the canonical state and lived in houses around the church, sometimes referred to in charters as the abbey or monastery, as described by Egilbert in La Vie de saint Ermenfroy. The abbess exercised authority over the inhabitants of the abbey’s lands, and from 1155 onward certain privileges were granted to these inhabitants, including exemptions from labor and from watch duties on the ramparts.

List of Abbesses of Baume-les-Dames
- Élisabeth, abbess around 1034.
- Adèle, abbess around 1065. She concluded a treaty with Guichard, dean of the church of Saint-Paul, by which they agreed that if serfs from their two monasteries married, their children would be divided between the two communities.
- Adeline, abbess in 1117.
- Étiennette de Bourgogne, abbess in 1119.
- Sibile, abbess mentioned in a charter of Humbert of Besançon in 1147. She obtained successive renewals of the community’s privileges from Popes Innocent II and Celestine II.
- Étiennette de Bourgogne, in 1162. She requested arbitration from Emperor Frederick Barbarossa, Count of Burgundy, regarding a serious dispute with the provost of Mathay. Pope Lucius III ordered her to ensure that the monastery adhered to the rules of life of Saint Benedict.
- Clémence de Bourgogne, in 1204. She left monastic life in 1212 to marry Berthold VI, Duke of Zeringen.
- Blandine de Chalon, in 1218. She is said to have been the natural daughter of the Count of Burgundy. She obtained from Archbishop Nicolas de Flavigny the patronage of the churches of Sainte-Marie-en-Châtel.
- Nicole de Roche, in 1266. She exchanged her property in Chassey with Thièbaud de Rougemont for the lordship of Trouvans. She obtained from Henri de Saint-Léger, parish priest of Villers-le-Sec, what he held from his ancestors at the place called Saint-Léger, where the abbesses established a vineyard.
- Béatrix I de Bourgogne, in 1276. The Palatine Count Philippe and his wife Alix confirmed the transfer of the washing places at Pont-les-Moulins that Count Hugues had granted to the abbey in 1256. She confirmed the acquisition of the fief of Baume-les-Dames by the lords of Neuchâtel.
- Béatrix II de Cromari, in 1313.
- Sibilette de Vaivre, from 1326 to 1355. She had to open the abbey’s great hall for a session of the Parliament of Burgundy.
- Alix I de Montbazon, from 1355 to 1374. She was elected with the support of Thiébaud de Neuchâtel. He presented himself among the nuns and demanded the honor of guaranteeing the legitimacy of the election, as his fathers and predecessors had done in similar cases, peacefully and for as long as there was no memory to the contrary. Since everyone hesitated about the validity of the procedure, he submitted his right to the arbitration of a group of priests and knights, who all agreed and proclaimed the Lord of Neuchâtel, viscount of Baume, to have the right and seniority to participate in the election of the abbess, and that each should restrain themselves until the election of the abbess was made by the said Lord of Neuchâtel and the ladies who were in that chapter.
- Louise de Chalon, from 1375 to 1388. Daughter of the Count of Auxerre, she was deposed by Guillaume, Archbishop of Besançon, because of her poor administration.
- Isabelle de Maisonval, from 1388 to 1418. She died in 1423. She obtained exemption from taxes for her loyal subjects in 1405. When the bridge over the Doubs was destroyed by major floods, the inhabitants ceded the rights to it to the abbey in exchange for its reconstruction and maintenance.
- Jeanne I de Salins, from 1423 to 1440.
- Marguerite I de Salins, from 1440 to 1458.
- Agnès de Ray, from 1458 to 1475.
- Douce de la Rochelle, in 1475 to 1476.
- Alix II de Montmartin, from 1476 to 1484. She had the abbey’s charters deposited in Besançon.
- Catherine de Neuchâtel, in 1493.
- Marguerite II de Neuchâtel, from 1510 to 1549. The tomb of Marguerite de Neuchâtel existed in the abbey, and bore the following epitaph: “Here lies a high and powerful lady, Madame Marguerite de Neufchâtel, Lady of Remiremont and abbess of this place; daughter of the high and powerful lord, Sir Claude de Neufchâtel, knight of the Order of the Golden Fleece, and of Lady Bonne de Boulai, lord and lady of the said Neufchâtel, of Châtel-sur-Moselle, Beaurepaire, etc., who died on 3 September 1549.”
- Élisabeth de Morimont, from 1549 to 1571.
- Jeanne II de Rye, from 1571 to 1582. She died in 1582. Appointed by order of Pope Pius V in 1571. She attempted in vain to oppose the creation of a municipality in Baume-les-Dames.
- Marguerite III de Genève, from 1582 to 1618. She donated land for the construction of a convent of Capuchin monks.
- Reine-Hélène I de Rye, from 1618 to 1647. She died in 1647. Due to wars and diseases ravaging the Baume region, the abbess and the nuns took refuge in Besançon, taking with them the relics of Saint Germain.
- Anne-Gasparine d’Andelot, from 1648 to 1652. Installed with the approval of the town’s mayor. Following the major upheavals of recent years, the abbess agreed to give up her judicial rights over the town to keep her position; she ceded the bridge over the Doubs and renounced several dues.
- Reine-Hélène II du Mouchet de Battefort de Laubespin, from 1653 to 1661. Appointed by the King of Spain, who for several years had participated in the election of the abbess.
- Marie d’Achey, from 1661 to 1684.
- Françoise de Thiard de Bissy, from 1684 to 1725. With the County of Burgundy attached to France, it was Louis XIV who issued her official appointment.
- Angélique de Thiard, from 1725 to 1728.
- Marie-Françoise d’Achey, from 1728 to 1750.
- Angélique-Henriette Damas de Crux, from 1750 to 1767. The abbess assumed the title of “illustrious and reverend lady.”
- Marie-Philippine-Léopoldine d’Andelot, canoness since 6 August 1738, appointed abbess on 15 November 1767 by King Louis XV and confirmed by a papal bull on 9 February 1768. Her appointment was criticized because she was born abroad. On the grounds that her brother, the Count of Andelot, had long served the king and owned significant property in Burgundy, especially in Franche-Comté, the monarch resolved this issue by granting the abbess letters of naturalization.
- Angélique-Perronne du Mouchet de Battefort de Laubespin, from 1773 to 1787.
- Marie-Françoise du Mouchet de Battefort de Laubespin, from 1787 to 1791. After the French Revolution and the confiscation of all the abbey’s property, she retired to Switzerland with a few nuns. She returned to Besançon a few years later and died there in poverty.

The abbesses also engaged in economic activity to secure income. From the beginning of the 11th century, they benefited from the revenues of several surrounding churches, and they were later assigned income from the buildings of Saint-Hippolyte, Dampierre-sur-le-Doubs, Saint-Maurice, Montecheroux, and other properties. These holdings continued to increase over the centuries through contributions from local lords and the Counts of Burgundy. In 1464, they built a paper mill on the Doubs River in the direction of Pontarlier, where they produced rag paper, a product invented in the 13th century. This activity contributed to the spread of rag paper in Franche-Comté. They also built a bridge over the Doubs, which provided access to the site; the bridge operated as a toll bridge, meaning that crossing fees were charged to regulate entries and exits from Baume-les-Dames.

In 1791, the abbey was permanently closed during the French Revolution, and the furnishings and titles of the canonesses were sold.

In 1811, the town purchased the building, which was subsequently used as a warehouse, a grain hall, a ballroom, a cinema, and a garage.

From 1982 onward, masonry work was undertaken to stabilize the main façade, which was at risk of collapsing.

== Nuns and notable personalities ==
- Césarine-Elisabeth de Montrichard (between 1762 and 1791)

== Abbey church ==
The abbey church was constructed between 1738 and 1760 on a cruciform plan in the Classical and Baroque styles. It features a short nave of two bays and a basilican structure.

== Rehabilitation ==
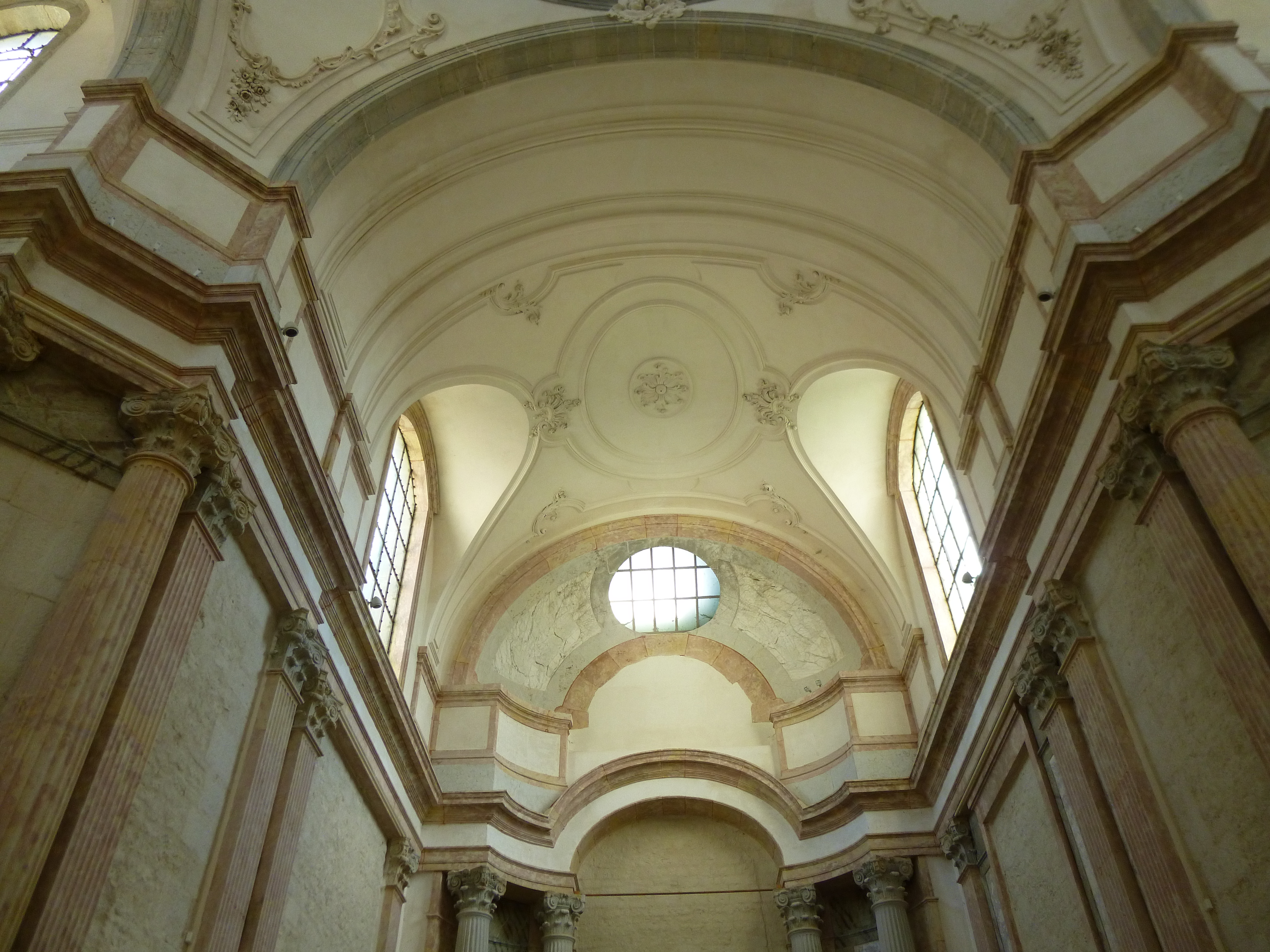
The interior of the church: vaulted ceiling of the choir.

Since 2001, the municipality has carried out a large rehabilitation project to restore the abbey church, under the supervision of the historic monuments authorities and with co-financing from the State, the region, and the department. Marbles, stuccoes, and floors have been replaced, including the reconstruction of the white marble columns that were removed during the Napoleonic period and later destroyed in the fire at the Tuileries in 1870; these were replaced by monolithic columns of white limestone carved by the company Piantanida. The building was also equipped with underfloor heating, lighting, dressing rooms, and other facilities, and it now functions as a cultural venue capable of hosting concerts, exhibitions, performances, and other events.

== Protections ==
The former abbey church has been classified as a historic monument since 12 July 1886.

On 7 May 2007, additional elements of the site were listed as historic monuments, including all façades and roofs of the buildings, all floors and subsoils containing archaeological remains, the entrance to the abbey, the south sacristy of the church, the vaulted cellar of the outbuildings, the portion of the abbess’s residence at 2 Place de l’Abbaye, and the houses at 6 and 8 Place de l’Abbaye.

== Musical works ==
On the occasion of the 150th anniversary of the Municipal Wind Band of Baume-les-Dames, Dutch composer and conductor Jacob de Haan composed Odilia, a pop-style overture inspired by the legend of Saint Odile. The piece premiered on 18 May 2012 at the Centre d’Affaires et de Rencontres of Baume-les-Dames.

On the occasion of the inauguration of the exhibition Le siècle de Gutenberg, voyages au temps des premiers imprimeurs in January 2012, Franche-Comté composer William Grosjean composed Chronoscopie : sept questions posées au temps, a work for 15 instrumentalists divided into three ensembles. The piece was commissioned by the city of Baume-les-Dames, and its score is held at the city’s media library. A recording produced by the Passavant acoustic studio of Philippe Muller is available in the media library’s audio collection.

Michaël Faivre, a composer and conductor, composed the wind orchestra piece Balma in honor of Baume-les-Dames. The work premiered on 11 May 2019.

== See also ==
- Church (building)
- List of abbeys and priories

== Bibliography ==
- Goethals, Félix-Victor (1849). Dictionnaire généalogique et héraldique des familles nobles du royaume de Belgique [Genealogical and heraldic dictionary of noble families of the Kingdom of Belgium] (in French). Vol. 1. p. 53.
- Poncelin de la Roche-Tilhac, Jean-Charles (1785). État des cours de l'Europe et des provinces de France : pour l'année MDCCLXXXV [State of affairs in Europe and the provinces of France: for the year MDCCLXXXV] (in French). p. 33.
- Nicolas Richard, Jean François (1847). Histoire des diocèses de Besançon et de Saint-Claude [History of the Dioceses of Besançon and Saint-Claude] (in French). Vol. 1. p. 80.
- Dunod de Charnage, François Ignace (1735). Histoire des Séquanois et de la province séquanoise, des Bourguignons et du premier (seconde, troisième et quatrième) royaume de Bourgogne [History of the Sequani and the Sequanian province, the Burgundians, and the first (second, third, and fourth) kingdoms of Burgundy] (in French). pp. 122, 162.
- Werdet, Edmond (1862). Histoire du livre en France depuis les temps les plus reculés jusqu'en 1789 [History of books in France from the earliest times to 1789] (in French). p. 247.
- Unknown (1863). La Belgique héraldique : recueil historique, chronologique, généalogique et biographique complet de toutes les maisons nobles, reconnues de la Belgique [Heraldic Belgium: a comprehensive historical, chronological, genealogical, and biographical compendium of all recognized noble houses in Belgium] (in French). Ch. Poplimont. pp. 125, 142.
- Unknown. Les Deux Bourgognes : études provinciales [The Two Burgundies: Provincial Studies] (in French). Vol. 6–7. Bureau de la revue. pp. 141, 238, 248.
- Besson, Louis (1845). Mémoire historique sur l'abbaye de Baume-les-Dames [Historical memoir on the Abbey of Baume-les-Dames] (in French). Besançon: Tubergue et Jacquot libraires.
- Viton de Saint-Allais, Nicolas (1843). Nobiliaire universel de France ou recueil général des généalogies historiques des maisons nobles de ce royaume [Universal Nobility of France or general collection of historical genealogies of the noble houses of this kingdom] (in French). Vol. 21. Bureau universel de France. pp. 376, 377.
- Bouchey, Eugène-Augustin (1862). Recherches historiques sur la ville de Mandeure (Epomandonadorum) [Historical research on the town of Mandeure (Epomandonadorum)] (in French). pp. 49, 138, 161, 193, 203, 204, 324.
- Mischi, Dominique (1997). institutions et magistrats municipaux à Baume les dames (1576-1793) [Municipal institutions and magistrates in Baume-les-Dames (1576–1793)] (Ph.D thesis) (in French).
