= Montmollin (surname) =

Montmollin is a surname. Notable people with this surname include:

- David-François de Montmollin (1721–1803), Canadian colonist and Anglican priest
- John S. Montmollin (1808–1859), American slave trader and banker
- Simone de Montmollin (born 1968), Swiss politician
- Violaine Blétry-de Montmollin, Swiss politician

== See also ==
- Montmollin, locality in Switzerland
