= Neuchâtel (disambiguation) =

Neuchâtel is a city in Switzerland.

Neuchâtel may also refer to:

- Neuchatel, Kansas, a community in the United States

== Neuchâtel, Switzerland ==
- Canton of Neuchâtel, whose capital is the city
  - Neuchâtel (district), within the canton, contains the city
- Neuchatel Junior College, a private Canadian grade 12 program in the town of Neuchatel
- Neuchâtel Xamax, a football club in the city
- Lake Neuchâtel, with the city on its shore
- University of Neuchâtel, in the city
- Principality of Neuchâtel, the historic principality preceding the present-day Canton

== See also ==
- Neuchâtel-Urtière a French commune in the Doubs département.
- Neufchâtel (disambiguation)
- Castelnau (disambiguation)
