= New Castle micropolitan area =

The New Castle micropolitan area may refer to:

- The New Castle, Pennsylvania micropolitan area, United States
- The New Castle, Indiana micropolitan area, United States

== See also ==
- Newcastle (disambiguation)
