= Castelnuovo =

Castelnuovo or Castel Nuovo (Italian for 'new castle/fortress') may refer to:

== Places and jurisdictions ==
=== In Italy ===
Comuni (communes or municipalities):

- Castelnuovo, Trentino, Province of Trento
- Castelnuovo Belbo, Province of Asti
- Castelnuovo Berardenga, Province of Siena
- Castelnuovo Bocca d'Adda, Province of Lodi
- Castelnuovo Bormida, Province of Alessandria
- Castelnuovo Bozzente, Province of Como
- Castelnuovo Calcea, Province of Asti
- Castelnuovo Cilento, Province of Salerno
- Castelnuovo del Garda, Province of Verona
- Castelnuovo della Daunia, Province of Foggia
- Castelnuovo di Ceva, Province of Cuneo
- Castelnuovo di Conza, Province of Salerno
- Castelnuovo di Farfa, Province of Rieti
- Castelnuovo di Garfagnana, Province of Lucca
- Castelnuovo di Porto, Province of Rome
- Castelnuovo di Val di Cecina, Province of Pisa
- Castelnuovo Don Bosco, Province of Asti
- Castelnuovo Magra, Province of La Spezia
- Castelnuovo Nigra, Province of Turin
- Castelnuovo Parano, Province of Frosinone
- Castelnuovo Rangone, Province of Modena
- Castelnuovo Scrivia, Province of Alessandria

Frazioni (hamlets):

- Castelnuovo, part of Assisi, Province of Perugia, Umbria, central Italy
- Castelnuovo, part of Sassocorvaro Auditore, Province of Pesaro and Urbino
- Castelnuovo della Misericordia, part of Rosignano Marittimo, Province of Livorno
- Castelnuovo, part of Prato, Province of Prato
- Castelnuovo, part of Vergato, Province of Bologna
- Castelnuovo, part of Teolo, Province of Padova
- Castelnuovo dei Sabbioni, part of Cavriglia, Province of Arezzo

Other places and fortresses :

- Castelnuovo, Avezzano, medieval town forming part of the Comune of Avezzano, Province of L’Aquila, Abruzzo
- Castel Nuovo, a fortress in Naples
- Castello Nuovo, a former fortress in Brescia

=== Elsewhere ===
- Castelnuovo d'Istria, Italian name of Podgrad, Ilirska Bistrica, Slovenia
- Castelnuovo di Cattaro, often simply Castelnuovo, former name of Herceg Novi, Montenegro
- Kaštel Novi, Dalmatia, Croatia; Castelnuovo in Italian

== Other uses ==
- Castelnuovo (surname)
- U.S. Castelnuovo Garfagnana, Italian football club
- Siege of Castelnuovo, 1539 battle between Spain and the Ottoman Empire

== See also ==
- Castelnovo (disambiguation)
- Casalnuovo (disambiguation)
- Castelnuovo–de Franchis theorem
