= Tazeh Qaleh =

Tazeh Qaleh (Persian: تازه قلعه) may refer to various places in Iran:

- Tazeh Qaleh, East Azerbaijan
- Tazeh Qaleh, Bojnord, North Khorasan Province
- Tazeh Qaleh, Maneh and Samalqan, North Khorasan Province
- Tazeh Qaleh, Shirvan, North Khorasan Province
- Tazeh Qaleh, Bukan, West Azerbaijan Province
- Tazeh Qaleh, Naqadeh, West Azerbaijan Province
- Tazeh Qaleh, Piranshahr, West Azerbaijan Province
