= Casalnuovo =

Casalnuovo ("New Casale") is the name of several places in Italy:

- Casalnuovo di Napoli, a municipality of the Province of Naples, Campania
- Casalnuovo Monterotaro, a municipality of the Province of Foggia, Apulia
- Casalbuono, a municipality of the Province of Salerno, Campania; known as Casalnuovo until 1862
- Cittanova, a comune (municipality) in the Metropolitan City of Reggio Calabria; known as Casalnuovo until 1852
- Basicò, a comune (municipality) in the Metropolitan City of Messina, Sicily; known as Casalnuovo until 1862

== See also ==
- Castelnovo (disambiguation)
- Castelnuovo (disambiguation)
