= Neuenburg =

Neuenburg may refer to:

- Neuenburg am Rhein, a town in Baden-Württemberg, Germany
- Neuenburg, part of Zetel in Lower Saxony, Germany
- Neuenburg, part of Löffingen in Baden-Württemberg, Germany
- Neuenburg, in Manitoba, Canada
- Neuenburg Castle (Freyburg) in Saxony-Anhalt, Germany
- Neuenbürg, a town in Baden-Württemberg, Germany
- the German name for Neuchâtel, a city in Switzerland, also the canton and the lake
- Neuenburg an der Elbe, the German name for Nymburk, a town in the Czech Republic
- the German exonym for Jaunpils, a village in Latvia
- Neuenburg in Westpreußen, the German name for Nowe, a town in Świecie County, Kuyavian-Pomeranian Voivodeship, Poland
