= Castelnuovo (surname) =

Castelnuovo is an Italian surname which loosely translates as Newcastle in English. Notable people with the surname include:

- Emma Castelnuovo (1913–2014), Italian mathematician and teacher
- Enrico Castelnuovo (1839–1915), Italian writer
- Guido Castelnuovo (1865–1952), Italian mathematician
- Mario Castelnuovo-Tedesco (1895–1968), Italian composer
- Nino Castelnuovo (1936–2021), Italian actor
