= Châtelneuf =

Châtelneuf may refer to:

- Châtelneuf, Jura, a commune of the French region of Franche-Comté
- Châtelneuf, Loire, a commune of the French region of Rhône-Alpes
- Essertines-en-Châtelneuf, a commune of France in the Loire department

== See also ==
- Châteauneuf (disambiguation)
