= Castelnovo =

Castelnovo is the name of several comunes in Italy:

- Castelnovo Bariano, Province of Rovigo
- Castelnovo del Friuli, Province of Pordenone
- Castelnovo di Sotto, Province of Reggio Emilia
- Castelnovo ne' Monti, Province of Reggio Emilia

== See also ==
- Casalnuovo (disambiguation)
- Castelnuovo (disambiguation)
