= Newcastle Airport =

Newcastle or New Castle Airport may refer to:

- Newcastle International Airport, an airport in Newcastle upon Tyne, England, UK
  - Newcastle Airport metro station, the Tyne and Wear metro station serving the airport
- Newcastle Airport (Nevis), now Vance W. Amory International Airport, an airport in Charlestown, Saint Kitts and Nevis
- Newcastle Airport (New South Wales), an airport in Williamtown, New South Wales, Australia
- Newcastle Airport (South Africa), an airport in Newcastle, South Africa
- Newcastle Aerodrome, an airport in the Republic of Ireland
- Wilmington-Philadelphia Regional Airport (formerly New Castle Airport) and New Castle Air National Guard Base in New Castle County, Delaware, United States (FAA/IATA: ILG)
- New Castle Municipal Airport near New Castle, Pennsylvania, United States (FAA: UCP)
- New Castle-Henry County Municipal Airport in New Castle, Indiana, United States (FAA: UWL)

== See also ==
- RAAF Base Williamtown, a military airbase near Newcastle, New South Wales
