= Neufchâteau =

Neufchâteau may refer to:

== Places ==
- Neufchâteau, Luxembourg Province, a city and municipality in the province of Luxembourg, Wallonia, Belgium
  - Arrondissement of Neufchâteau, Belgium
  - Lake Neufchâteau, a little artificial lake
  - Château Neufchâteau, on the List of castles and châteaux in Belgium
  - Neufchâteau (B) railway station, a railway station on the L12 line Libramont-Luxembourg, see List of Belgian railway services
- Neufchâteau, Liège, a village in the province of Liège, Wallonia, Belgium
- Neufchâteau, Vosges, a municipality in the Vosges department, France
  - Arrondissement of Neufchâteau, Vosges
  - Canton of Neufchâteau, communes in eastern France and Grand Est
  - Neufchâteau station, a railway station in Neufchâteau, Vosges
  - Neufchâteau Airport, on the List of airports in France

== People ==
- André of Neufchâteau (died c. 1400), a French Franciscan and scholastic philosopher
- François de Neufchâteau (1750–1828), French statesman, poet, and scientist

== Other uses ==
- Battle of Neufchâteau, also known as the Battle of Rossignol, a World War I battle in August 1914
- Chateau Neuf, a building in Oslo
- Chateau-Neuf de Saint-Germain-en-Laye, a now mostly demolished castle in Saint-Germain-en-Laye, France

== See also ==
- Châteauneuf (disambiguation)
- Neufchâtel (disambiguation)
