= David-François de Montmollin =

Swiss-Canadian Anglican priest

David-François de Montmollin (18 March 1721 – 17 December 1803) was a Canadian colonist from the Principality of Neuchâtel (then a Prussian principality and now part of Switzerland), landowner, and Anglican priest. He was the first French-speaking Anglican priest in Quebec. Born into a Huguenot family of minor nobility in Neuchâtel, he studied medicine at the University of Basel before emigrating to Holland and, later, England. De Montmollin was ordained as an Anglican priest by Richard Terrick, the Bishop of London, in 1768. He left London for Quebec, where he served as a minister to the French-speaking Protestant population.

== Biography ==
David-François de Montmollin was born on 18 March 1721 in Neuchâtel. He was the son of Louis de Montmollin, a member of the Grand Council of Neuchâtel, and Salomé Gaudot. His family were part of the minor Swiss nobility. He studied medicine at the University of Basel for three years. In 1744, de Montmollin emigrated to Leiden in Holland and, in 1748, he emigrated to London to continued his medical studies. He lived in London for twenty years and, in 1762, he married the Englishwoman Jane Bell, with whom he had five children.

In 1761, Protestants in Quebec were petitioning the Church of England for a second Anglican priest that was a French speaker, as their current priest, John Brooke, only spoke English. They hoped this would arouse the support of the majority Catholic population. Seven years passed without any response from the Church. On 12 February 1768, de Montmollin was appointed as the new cleric, although he was not yet ordained as a priest. In March of that year, he was ordained as a priest in the Church of England by Richard Terrick, the Bishop of London.

De Montmollin arrived in Quebec in June 1768. His arrival did not bode well with Guy Carleton, the Governor of Quebec, who believed the arrival of a French-speaking Protestant cleric would likely offend the Catholic hierarchy. As most Protestants in Quebec were affiliated with the Presbyterian Church, de Montmollin had only around thirty parishioners in 1770. He had intended to convert Catholics to the Anglican faith, but was unsuccessful and eventually ceased his efforts.

In the mid-1780s, concerning reports regarding de Montmollin were brought before the Bishop of London and Charles Inglis, the Bishop of Nova Scotia. In 1789 Inglis went to Quebec and asked for de Montmollin to retire. De Montmollin, who was having financial difficulties, initially refused but eventually accepted under pressure of the bishops in July of that year. He was replaced by Philip Toosey. In 1792, Toosey returned to London and de Montmollin returned to his post and, in 1796, obtained the position of assistant chaplain in the British Infantry that were stationed in Quebec. He died in Quebec on 17 December 1803, aged 82.
