= Castelnuovo, Assisi =

Castelnuovo
- Frazione
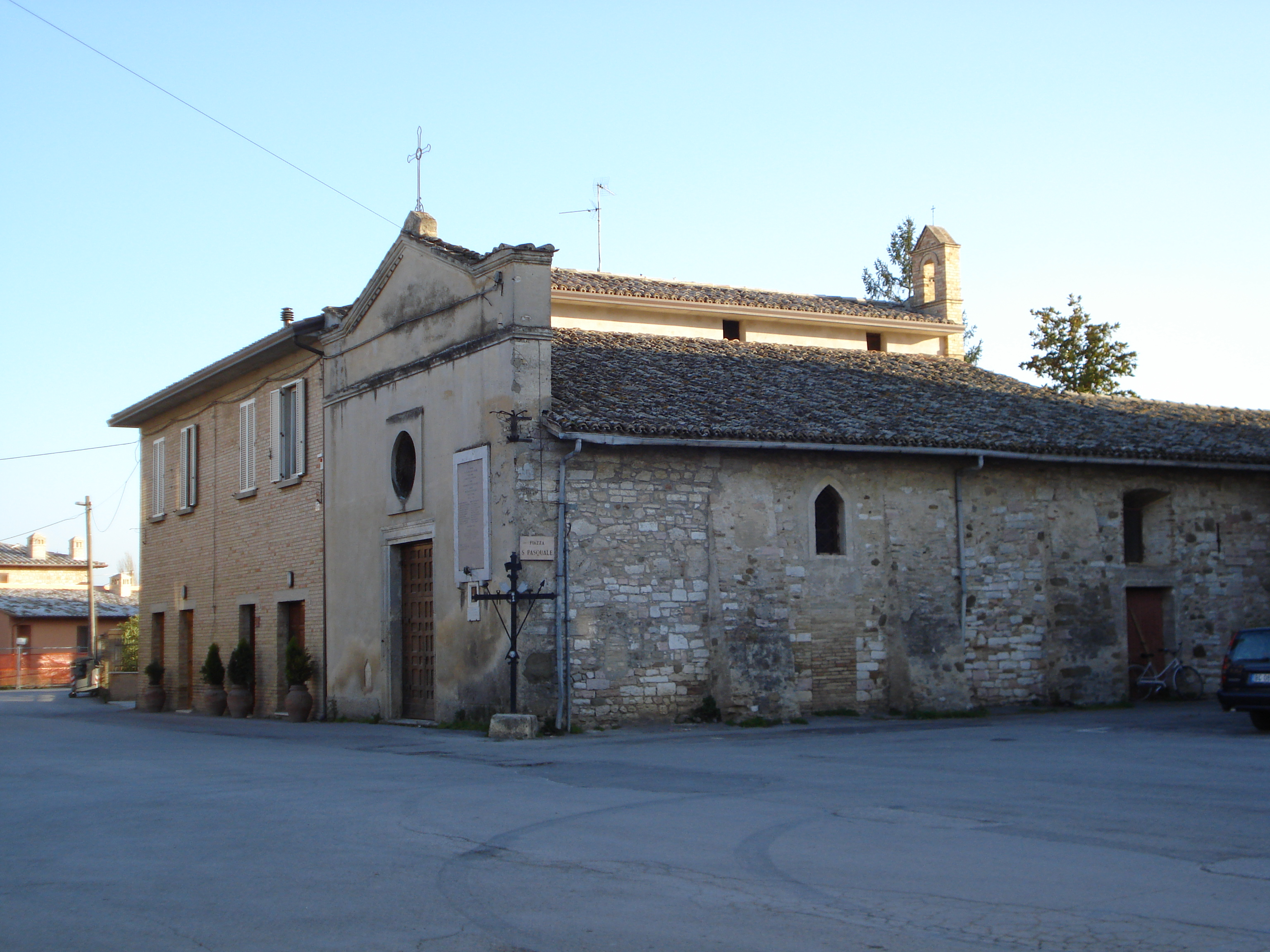

- Location of Castelnuovo in Italy
- Coordinates: 43°01′53″N 12°35′08″E
- Country: Italy
- Region: Umbria
- Province: Province of Perugia
- Comune: Assisi
- Elevation: 195 m (640 ft)

Population (2001)
  - Total: 754
- Demonym: Castelnovesi
- Time zone: UTC+1 (CET)
  - Summer (DST): UTC+2 (CEST)
- Dialing code: 075
- Patron saint: Paschal Baylon
- Saint day: May 17

Castelnuovo is a frazione of the comune of Assisi in the Province of Perugia, Umbria, central Italy. Castelnuovo is situated about 9 km from Assisi and is located in the southwest of Santa Maria degli Angeli. Is surrounded also with the territories of other 2 fractions Assisi: Tordandrea to the west, and Rivotorto to the east. To the south is bordered by the comune of Cannara.

It stands at an elevation of 195 metres above sea level. At the time of the Istat census of 2001 it had 754 inhabitants.

The most important watercourse is the river Ose, which basically it specify the frontier between Castelnuovo and Cannara.
