= Tazeh Qaleh, Bukan =

Tazeh Qaleh تازه قلعه
- Village
- Location within Iran
- Coordinates: 36°36′24″N 46°04′03″E
- Country: Iran
- Province: West Azerbaijan
- County: Bukan
- Bakhsh: Central
- Rural District: Akhtachi

Population (2006)
  - Total: 333
- Time zone: UTC+3:30 (IRST)
  - Summer (DST): UTC+4:30 (IRDT)

Tazeh Qaleh (Persian: تازه قلعه, also Romanized as Tāzeh Qal‘eh) is a village in Akhtachi Rural District, in the Central District of Bukan County, West Azerbaijan Province, Iran. At the 2006 census, its population was 333, in 71 families.
