= Châteauneuf-de-Bordette =

Châteauneuf-de-Bordette Chastelnòu de Bordeta (Occitan)
- Commune
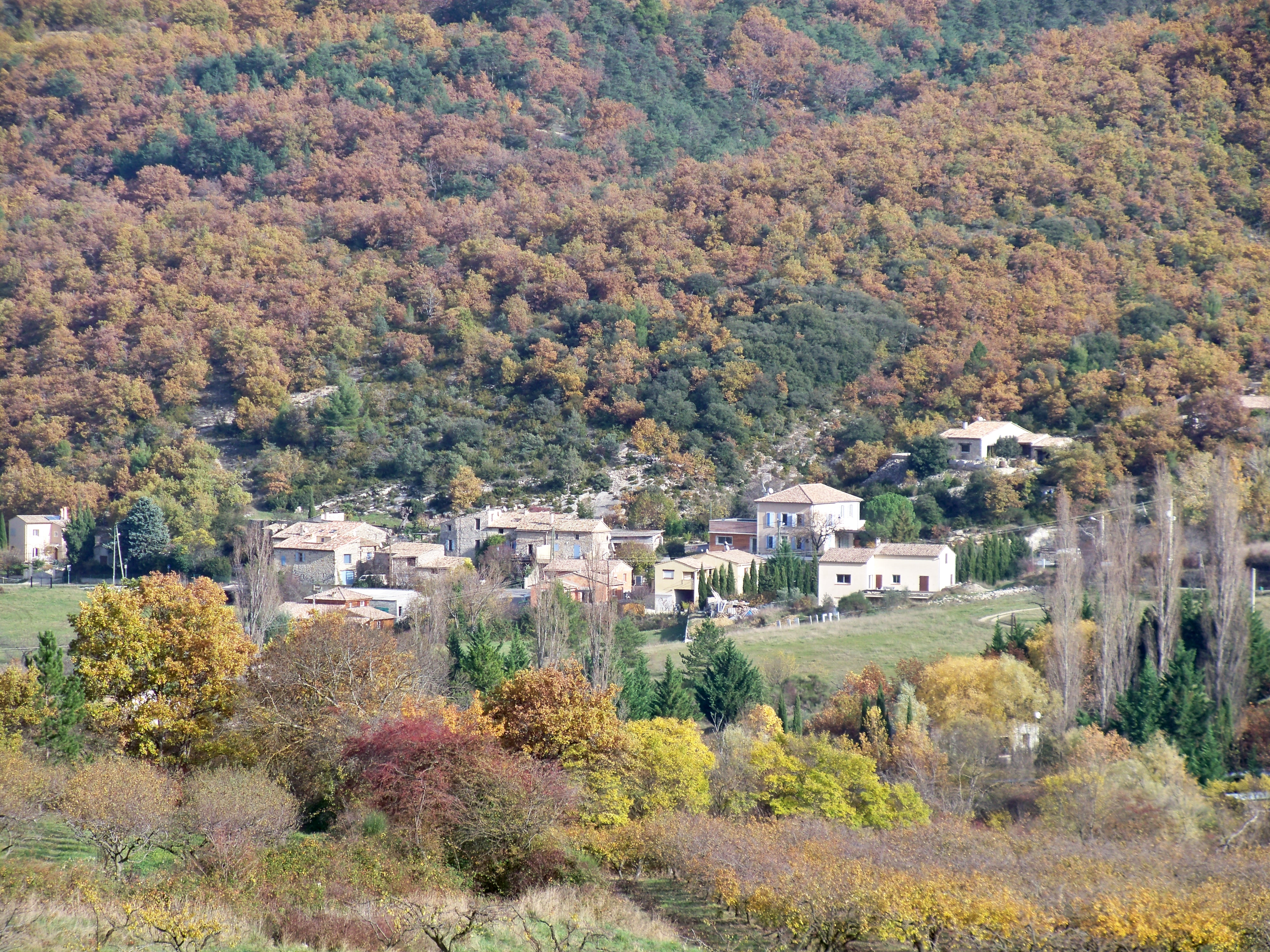
- The village of Châteauneuf-de-Bordette
- Location of Châteauneuf-de-Bordette
- Location within France Location within Auvergne-Rhône-Alpes
- Coordinates: 44°20′10″N 5°10′44″E
- Country: France
- Region: Auvergne-Rhône-Alpes
- Department: Drôme
- Arrondissement: Nyons
- Canton: Nyons et Baronnies

Government
  - Mayor (2020–2026): Philippe Cahn
- Area^{1}: 15.33 km^{2} (5.92 sq mi)
- Highest elevation: 940 m (3,080 ft)
- Lowest elevation: 346 m (1,135 ft)
- Population (2023): 101
  - Density: 6.59/km^{2} (17.1/sq mi)
- Time zone: UTC+01:00 (CET)
  - Summer (DST): UTC+02:00 (CEST)
- INSEE/Postal code: 26082 /26110
- ^{1} French Land Register data, which excludes lakes, ponds, glaciers > 1 km^{2} (0.386 sq mi or 247 acres) and river estuaries.

Châteauneuf-de-Bordette (French: [ʃɑtonœf də bɔʁdɛt]; Occitan: Chastelnòu de Bordeta) is a commune in the Drôme department in southeastern France.

== Population ==
Historical population
Year	Pop.	±% p.a.
1968	42	—
1975	36	−2.18%
1982	66	+9.05%
1990	77	+1.95%
1999	77	+0.00%
2007	110	+4.56%
2012	100	−1.89%
2017	96	−0.81%
2023	101	+0.85%
Source: INSEE

== See also ==
- Communes of the Drôme department
