= Trouvans =

- Commune
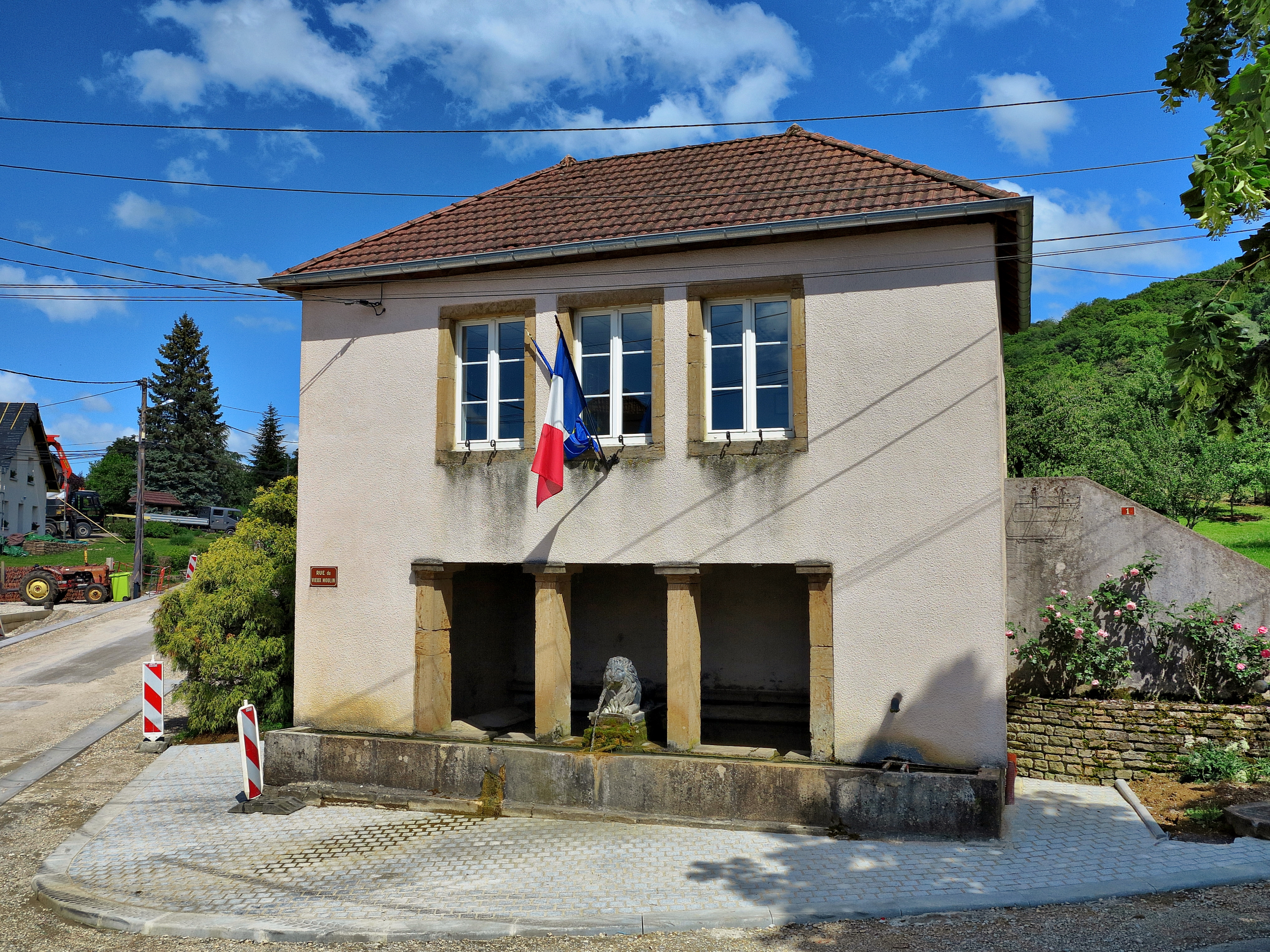
- The town hall in Trouvans
- Location of Trouvans
- Location within France Location within Bourgogne-Franche-Comté
- Coordinates: 47°25′27″N 6°20′57″E
- Country: France
- Region: Bourgogne-Franche-Comté
- Department: Doubs
- Arrondissement: Besançon
- Canton: Baume-les-Dames

Government
  - Mayor (2020–2026): Jacky Bouvard
- Area^{1}: 2.69 km^{2} (1.04 sq mi)
- Highest elevation: 470 m (1,540 ft)
- Lowest elevation: 297 m (974 ft)
- Population (2023): 100
  - Density: 37/km^{2} (96/sq mi)
- Time zone: UTC+01:00 (CET)
  - Summer (DST): UTC+02:00 (CEST)
- INSEE/Postal code: 25572 /25680
- ^{1} French Land Register data, which excludes lakes, ponds, glaciers > 1 km^{2} (0.386 sq mi or 247 acres) and river estuaries.

Trouvans (French pronunciation: [tʁuvɑ̃]) is a commune in the Doubs department in the Bourgogne-Franche-Comté region in eastern France.

== Geography ==
Trouvans lies 7 km (4.3 mi) south of Rougemont in a small valley dominated by the Mont du Ciel (427 m).

== Population ==
Historical population
| Year | Pop. | ±% p.a. |
|---|---|---|
| 1968 | 39 | — |
| 1975 | 46 | +2.39% |
| 1982 | 44 | −0.63% |
| 1990 | 44 | +0.00% |
| 1999 | 62 | +3.88% |
| 2007 | 77 | +2.75% |
| 2012 | 93 | +3.85% |
| 2017 | 104 | +2.26% |
| 2023 | 100 | −0.65% |
Source: INSEE

== See also ==
- Communes of the Doubs department
