= Violaine Blétry-de Montmollin =

Swiss politician

Member of the Neuchâtel Town Council
- Incumbent
- Assumed office 2016

Personal details
- Born: Violaine de Montmollin Auvernier, Neuchâtel, Switzerland
- Party: FDP.The Liberals
- Occupation: Accountant, estate manager

Violaine Blétry-de Montmollin (née de Montmollin) is a Swiss politician, accountant, and estate manager. She served as the president of the Canton of Neuchâtel's branch of FDP.The Liberals from 2009 to 2011. Since 2016, Blétry-de Montmollin has served on the Neuchâtel Town Council and held the offices of Vice President and President.

== Biography ==
Blétry-de Montmollin was born in Auvernier, Neuchâtel into a family of Swiss nobility, and grew up on her family's vineyard there. She is the daughter of Pierre de Montmollin, a winemaker and politician who served as the president of the Grand Council of Neuchâtel.

She was active in commune life while a student, and served as a class delegate at her school. She graduated with a degree in economics and became a liberal politician at the age of 25. She left the family business of wine making, and worked in finance as a fiduciary and later as an accountant. She left Neuchâtel and moved to New York City with her husband, who is from Jura, and lived there for a year. They returned to Switzerland in 2005, where she gave birth to two children.

She co-managed her family's estate and winery in Auvernier for six years. In 2008, when the Liberal Party of Switzerland and the Free Democratic Party of Switzerland merged to form FDP.The Liberals, Blétry-de Montmollin worked to manage relations between opposing sides within the new party. While serving as a member of the Grand Council of Neuchâtel, she became president of the Neuchâtel branch of the party when they were elected to the majority of the Council of State in 2009. During her presidency, the party was able to elect Didier Burkhalter to the Federal Council and Raphaël Comte to the Council of States. She also managed disagreements within the cantonal government and led the party through the political scandal and resignation of Frédéric Hainard.

In 2010 she was appointed as the secretary general of the Department of Education, Culture and Sports in Neuchâtel. Within her new position as a civil servant, she stepped down as president of the party in Neuchâtel. She later served on the town council and was a member of the Department of Territorial Development, Economy, Tourism and Built Heritage. In 2016 she was elected to the town council, and later served as the Vice President of the town council.
