= Saint-Michel-de-Castelnau =

- Commune
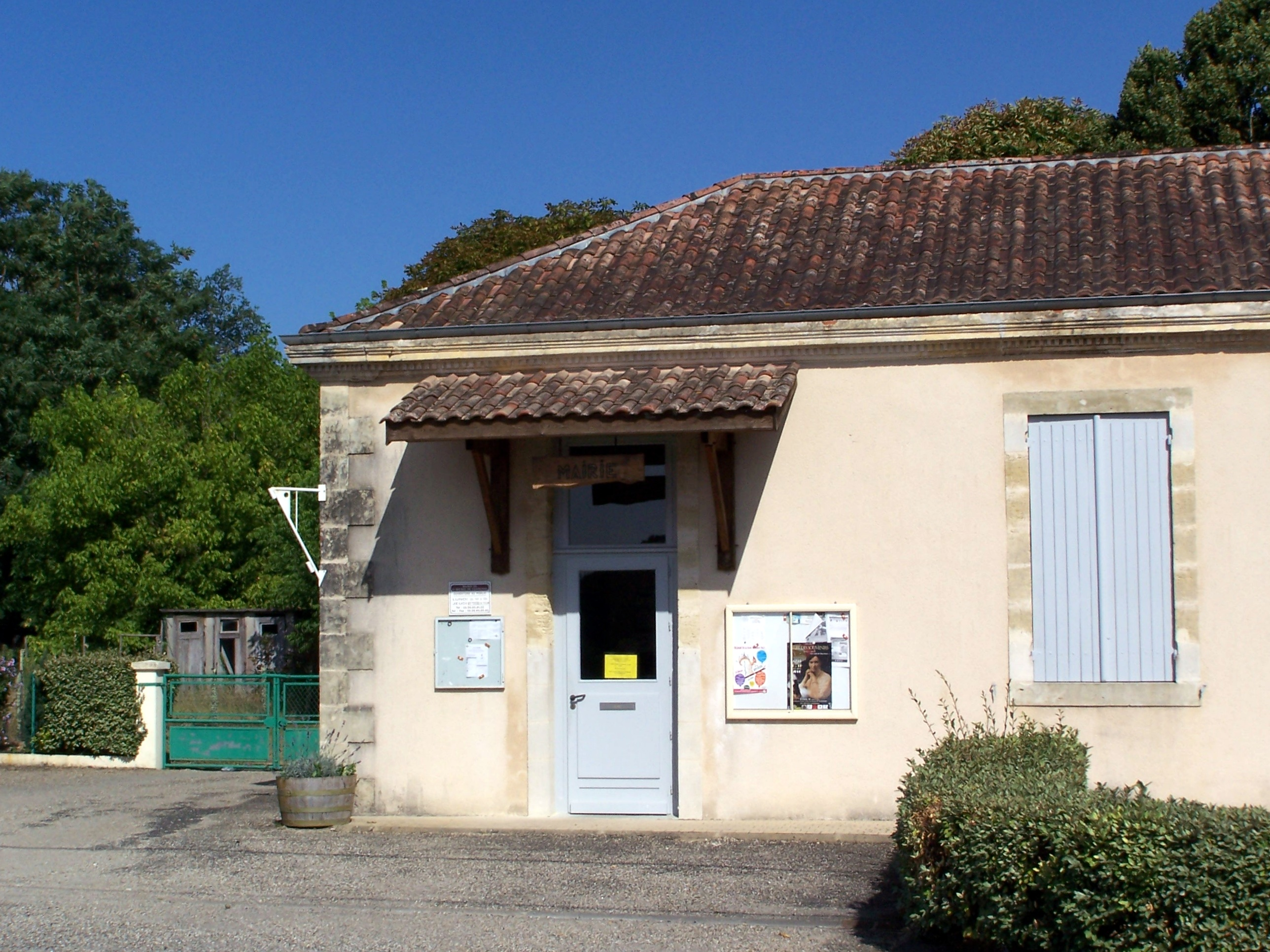
- Town hall
- Location of Saint-Michel-de-Castelnau
- Location within France Location within Nouvelle-Aquitaine
- Coordinates: 44°16′56″N 0°06′35″W
- Country: France
- Region: Nouvelle-Aquitaine
- Department: Gironde
- Arrondissement: Langon
- Canton: Le Sud-Gironde
- Intercommunality: Bazadais

Government
  - Mayor (2020–2026): Michel Darroman
- Area^{1}: 42.61 km^{2} (16.45 sq mi)
- Elevation: 99 m (325 ft)
- Highest elevation: 147 m (482 ft)
- Lowest elevation: 78 m (256 ft)
- Population (2023): 248
  - Density: 5.82/km^{2} (15.1/sq mi)
- Time zone: UTC+01:00 (CET)
  - Summer (DST): UTC+02:00 (CEST)
- INSEE/Postal code: 33450 /33840
- ^{1} French Land Register data, which excludes lakes, ponds, glaciers > 1 km^{2} (0.386 sq mi or 247 acres) and river estuaries.

Saint-Michel-de-Castelnau (French pronunciation: [sɛ̃ miʃɛl də kastɛlno]; Occitan: Sent Miquèu de Castèthnau) is a commune in the Gironde department in Nouvelle-Aquitaine in southwestern France.

== Population ==
Historical population
Year	Pop.	±% p.a.
1968	334	—
1975	268	−3.10%
1982	224	−2.53%
1990	211	−0.74%
1999	216	+0.26%
2007	235	+1.06%
2012	225	−0.87%
2017	237	+1.04%
2023	248	+0.76%
Source: INSEE

== See also ==
- Communes of the Gironde department
