= Châteauneuf =

Châteauneuf may refer to:

== Switzerland ==
- Châteauneuf, Sion, in Sion, Switzerland

== Places in France called Châteauneuf alone ==
- Châteauneuf, Côte-d'Or
- Châteauneuf, Loire
- Châteauneuf, Saône-et-Loire
- Châteauneuf, Savoie
- Châteauneuf, Vendée

== Places in France called Châteauneuf in combination ==
- Châteauneuf-du-Pape AOC, the wine region
- Châteauneuf-de-Bordette, Drôme
- Châteauneuf-de-Chabre, Hautes-Alpes
- Châteauneuf-de-Gadagne, Vaucluse
- Châteauneuf-de-Galaure, Drôme
- Châteauneuf-d'Entraunes, Alpes-Maritimes
- Châteauneuf-de-Randon, Lozère
- Châteauneuf-de-Vernoux, Ardèche
- Châteauneuf-d'Ille-et-Vilaine, Ille-et-Vilaine
- Châteauneuf-d'Oze, Hautes-Alpes
- Châteauneuf-du-Faou, Finistère
- Châteauneuf-du-Pape, Vaucluse
- Châteauneuf-du-Rhône, Drôme
- Châteauneuf-en-Thymerais, Eure-et-Loir
- Châteauneuf-Grasse, Alpes-Maritimes
- Châteauneuf-la-Forêt, Haute-Vienne
- Châteauneuf-le-Rouge, Bouches-du-Rhône
- Châteauneuf-les-Bains, Puy-de-Dôme
- Châteauneuf-les-Martigues, Bouches-du-Rhône
- Châteauneuf-Miravail, Alpes-de-Haute-Provence
- Châteauneuf-sur-Charente, Charente
- Châteauneuf-sur-Cher, Cher
- Châteauneuf-sur-Isère, Drôme
- Châteauneuf-sur-Loire, Loiret
- Châteauneuf-sur-Sarthe, Maine-et-Loire
- Châteauneuf-Val-de-Bargis, Nièvre
- Châteauneuf-Val-Saint-Donat, Alpes-de-Haute-Provence
- Châteauneuf-Villevieille, Alpes-Maritimes

== See also ==
- Châtelneuf (disambiguation)
- Neufchâteau (disambiguation)
