= Neuburg =

Neuburg or Neue Burg can refer to:

== Places ==
- Hofburg, the former principal imperial palace of the Habsburg dynasty located in the centre of Vienna
- Klosterneuburg, a town in Lower Austria
- Neuburg Air Base, an air base in Neuburg an der Donau, Germany
- Neuburg an der Donau, a town in the state of Bavaria, Germany
- Neuburg an der Kammel, a town in the district of Günzburg, Bavaria, Germany
- Neuburg (Freiburg im Breisgau), a quarter of Freiburg, Baden-Württemberg, Germany
- Neuburg am Inn, a town in the district of Passau, Bavaria, Germany
- Neuburg-Schrobenhausen, a district in the state of Bavaria in Germany
- Neuburg am Rhein, a municipality in the district of Germersheim, Rhineland-Palatinate, Germany
- Palatinate-Neuburg, a historic state of the Holy Roman Empire
- Neuburg, Mecklenburg-Vorpommern, a town in Mecklenburg-Vorpommern in Germany
- Neuburg (Winterthur), a quarter in Winterthur, Switzerland
- Neuburg Abbey, now a Benedictine monastery near Heidelberg, Rhineland-Palatinate, Germany
- Neue Burg (Hamburg), a medieval saxonian castle in the town of Hamburg

== Surname ==
- Hans Neuburg, Swiss designer and art critic
- Victor Benjamin Neuburg, British Writer
