= Neufchâtel =

Neufchâtel may refer to:

== Places ==
- Neuchâtel, city in Switzerland, formerly spelled Neufchâtel
  - Canton of Neuchâtel, whose capital is the city
  - Neuchâtel (district), within the canton, contains the city
  - Lake Neuchâtel, with the city on its shore
- Neufchâtel-Hardelot, a commune in Hauts-de-France, France
- Neufchâtel-sur-Aisne, a commune in Hauts-de-France, France
- Neufchâtel-en-Bray, a commune in Normandy, France
- Neufchâtel-en-Saosnois, a commune in Pays de la Loire, France
- Neuchâtel-Urtière, a commune in Bourgogne-Franche-Comté, France
- Neufchâtel, Quebec, a place in Quebec

== Others ==
- Neufchâtel cheese, a Normandy cheese
- Nicolas Neufchatel (ca. 1527 – ca. 1590), Flemish artist

== See also ==
- Neufchâteau (disambiguation)
