= Neuchâtel-Urtière =

- Commune
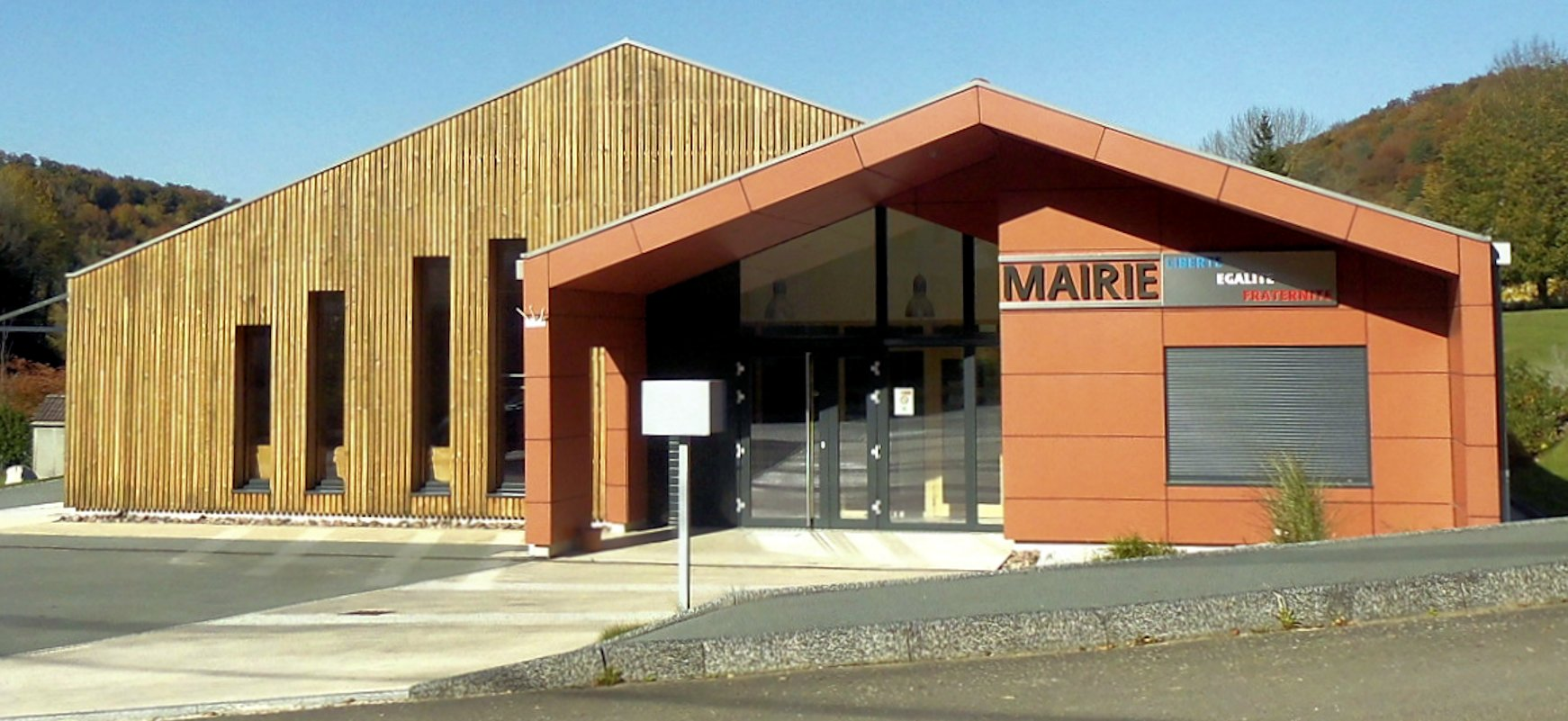
- The town hall in Neuchâtel-Urtière
- Location of Neuchâtel-Urtière
- Location within France Location within Bourgogne-Franche-Comté
- Coordinates: 47°23′N 6°44′E
- Country: France
- Region: Bourgogne-Franche-Comté
- Department: Doubs
- Arrondissement: Montbéliard
- Canton: Valentigney
- Intercommunality: Pays de Montbéliard Agglomération

Government
  - Mayor (2020–2026): Gilles Bourdois
- Area^{1}: 6.21 km^{2} (2.40 sq mi)
- Highest elevation: 828 m (2,717 ft)
- Lowest elevation: 373 m (1,224 ft)
- Population (2023): 164
  - Density: 26.4/km^{2} (68.4/sq mi)
- Time zone: UTC+01:00 (CET)
  - Summer (DST): UTC+02:00 (CEST)
- INSEE/Postal code: 25422 /25150
- ^{1} French Land Register data, which excludes lakes, ponds, glaciers > 1 km^{2} (0.386 sq mi or 247 acres) and river estuaries.

Neuchâtel-Urtière (French pronunciation: [nøʃatl yʁtjɛʁ]) is a commune in the Doubs department in the Bourgogne-Franche-Comté region in eastern France.

== Geography ==
The commune lies 15 km (9.3 mi) from Pont-de-Roide.

== Population ==
Historical population
Year	Pop.	±% p.a.
1968	73	—
1975	66	−1.43%
1982	83	+3.33%
1990	129	+5.67%
1999	149	+1.61%
2007	151	+0.17%
2012	167	+2.03%
2017	195	+3.15%
2023	164	−2.84%
Source: INSEE

== See also ==
- Communes of the Doubs department
