= Aubiac =

Aubiac is the name of the following communes in France:

- Aubiac, Gironde, in the Gironde department
- Aubiac, Lot-et-Garonne, in the Lot-et-Garonne department
