= Sauviac =

Sauviac is the name of several communes in France:

- Sauviac, Gers, in the Gers department
- Sauviac, Gironde, in the Gironde department
