= Birac =

Birac is the name or part of the name of the following communes in France:

- Birac, Charente, in the Charente department
- Birac, Gironde, in the Gironde department
- Birac-sur-Trec, in the Lot-et-Garonne department

It is also the name of a region of eastern Bosnia and Herzegovina:

- Birač (region)
