= Noaillan =

- Commune
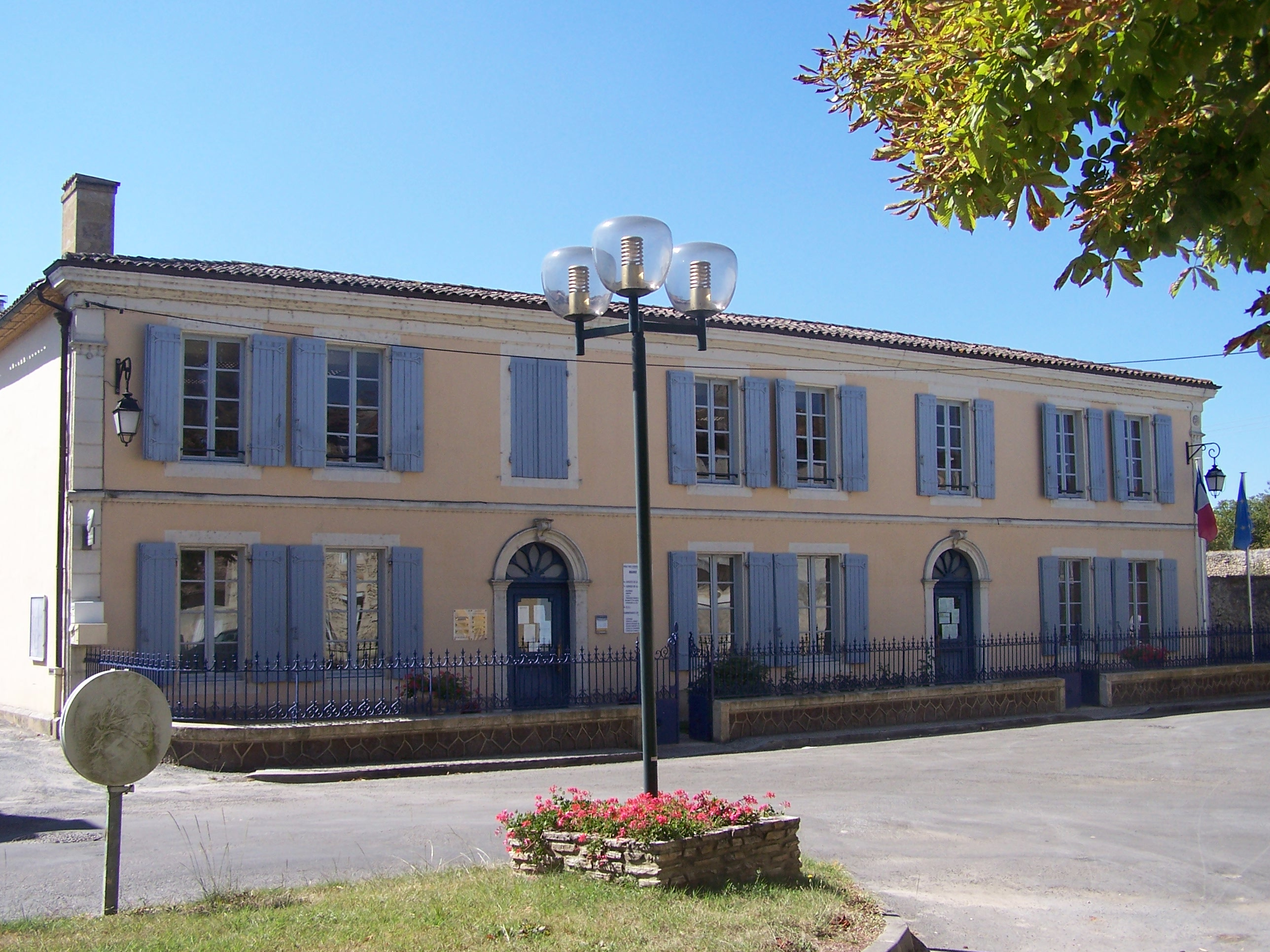
- Town hall

- Coat of arms
- Location of Noaillan
- Location within France Location within Nouvelle-Aquitaine
- Coordinates: 44°28′49″N 0°21′55″W
- Country: France
- Region: Nouvelle-Aquitaine
- Department: Gironde
- Arrondissement: Langon
- Canton: Le Sud-Gironde
- Intercommunality: Sud Gironde

Government
  - Mayor (2020–2026): Bernadette Sore Noël
- Area^{1}: 31.8 km^{2} (12.3 sq mi)
- Elevation: 140 m (460 ft)
- Highest elevation: 99 m (325 ft)
- Lowest elevation: 17 m (56 ft)
- Population (2023): 1,717
  - Density: 54.0/km^{2} (140/sq mi)
- Time zone: UTC+01:00 (CET)
  - Summer (DST): UTC+02:00 (CEST)
- INSEE/Postal code: 33307 /33730
- ^{1} French Land Register data, which excludes lakes, ponds, glaciers > 1 km^{2} (0.386 sq mi or 247 acres) and river estuaries.

Noaillan (French pronunciation: [nɔajɑ̃]; Occitan: Noalhan) is a commune in the Gironde department in Nouvelle-Aquitaine in southwestern France.

== Heraldry ==
Coat of arms of Noaillan	Party: 1st gules a silver garlic braid in pale supported by a hoof of the same, 2nd vert a maritime pine with its pot of gem or accompanied in base by a wavy tierce of the same; all surmounted by a chief argent charged with a castle of three towers azure, masoned, open and pierced sable.

== Population ==
Historical population
Year	Pop.	±% p.a.
1968	779	—
1975	772	−0.13%
1982	762	−0.19%
1990	858	+1.49%
1999	1,015	+1.88%
2007	1,397	+4.07%
2012	1,597	+2.71%
2017	1,679	+1.01%
2023	1,717	+0.37%
Source: INSEE

== See also ==
- Communes of the Gironde department
