= Toulenne =

- Commune
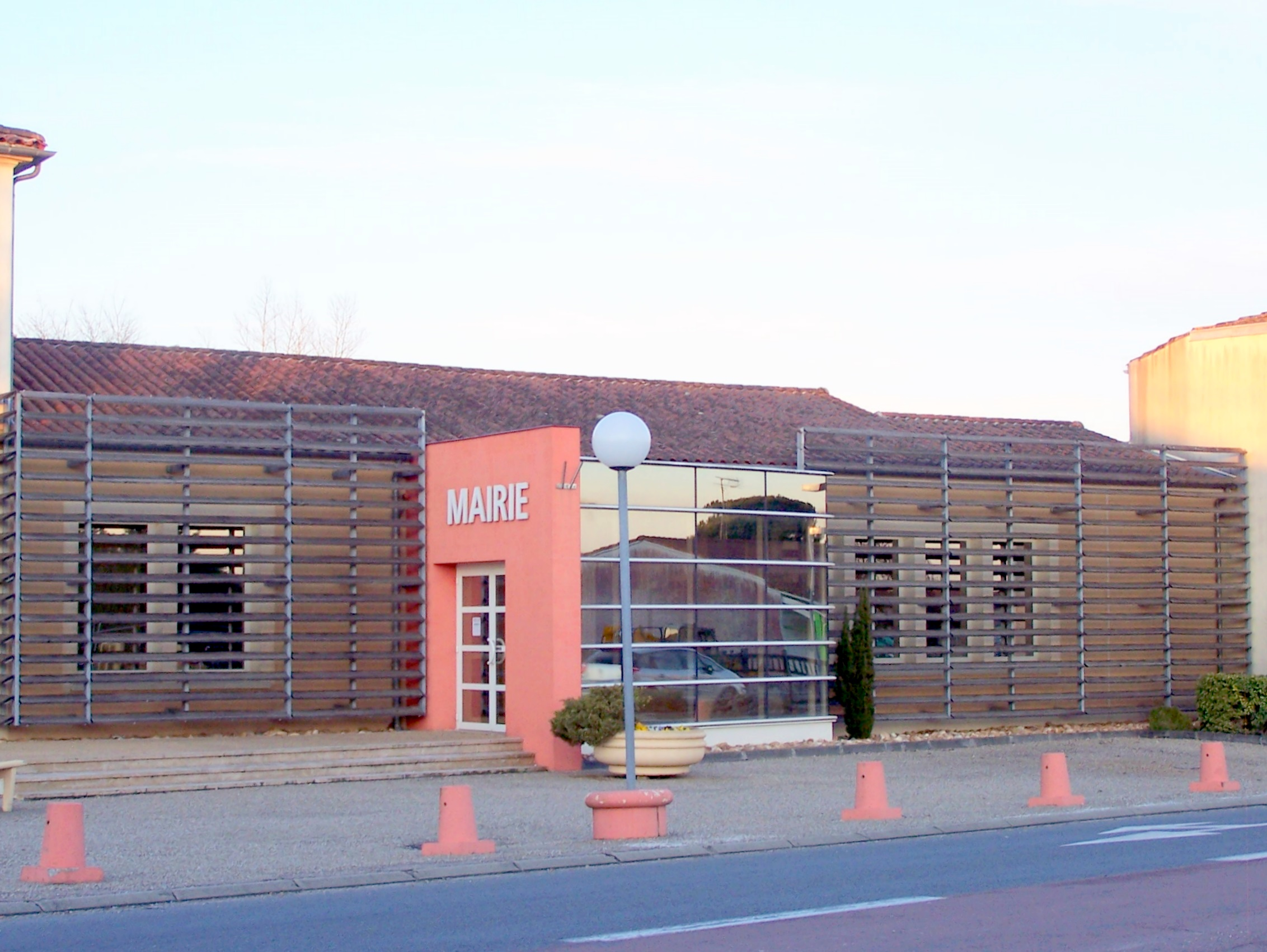
- The town hall in Toulenne
- Location of Toulenne
- Location within France Location within Nouvelle-Aquitaine
- Coordinates: 44°33′33″N 0°15′42″W
- Country: France
- Region: Nouvelle-Aquitaine
- Department: Gironde
- Arrondissement: Langon
- Canton: Le Sud-Gironde

Government
  - Mayor (2020–2026): Christian Daire
- Area^{1}: 6.58 km^{2} (2.54 sq mi)
- Elevation: 23 m (75 ft)
- Highest elevation: 34 m (112 ft)
- Lowest elevation: 1 m (3.3 ft)
- Population (2023): 2,881
  - Density: 438/km^{2} (1,130/sq mi)
- Time zone: UTC+01:00 (CET)
  - Summer (DST): UTC+02:00 (CEST)
- INSEE/Postal code: 33533 /33210
- ^{1} French Land Register data, which excludes lakes, ponds, glaciers > 1 km^{2} (0.386 sq mi or 247 acres) and river estuaries.

Toulenne (French pronunciation: [tulɛn]; Occitan: Tolena) is a commune in the Gironde department in Nouvelle-Aquitaine in southwestern France.

== Population ==
Historical population
Year	Pop.	±% p.a.
1968	1,046	—
1975	1,104	+0.77%
1982	1,743	+6.74%
1990	1,839	+0.67%
1999	1,994	+0.90%
2007	2,486	+2.80%
2012	2,546	+0.48%
2017	2,640	+0.73%
2023	2,881	+1.47%
Source: INSEE

== See also ==
- Communes of the Gironde department
