= Lucmau =

- Commune
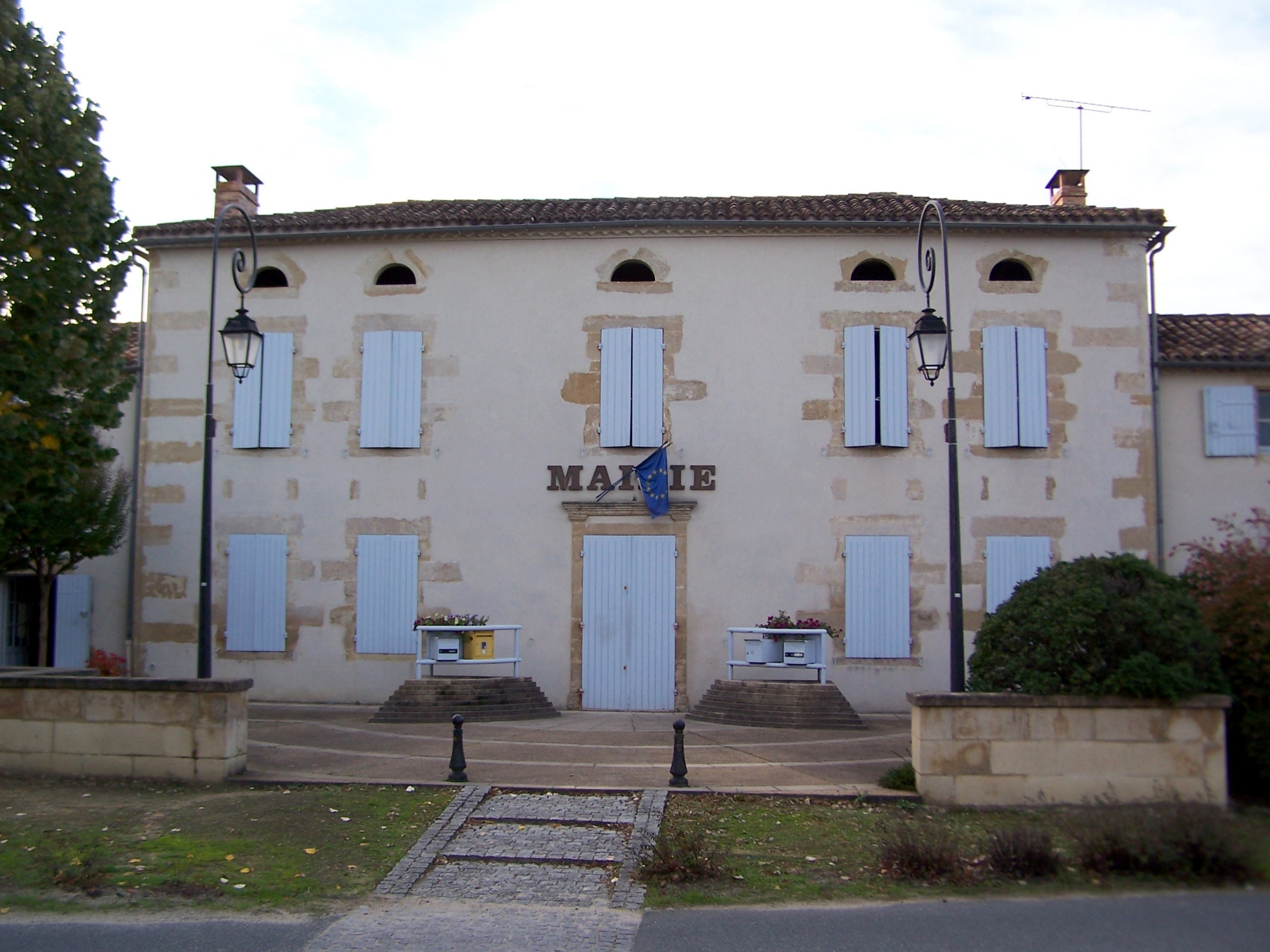
- Town hall
- Location of Lucmau
- Location within France Location within Nouvelle-Aquitaine
- Coordinates: 44°20′34″N 0°18′23″W
- Country: France
- Region: Nouvelle-Aquitaine
- Department: Gironde
- Arrondissement: Langon
- Canton: Le Sud-Gironde

Government
  - Mayor (2020–2026): Michel Estenaves
- Area^{1}: 66.73 km^{2} (25.76 sq mi)
- Elevation: 73 m (240 ft)
- Highest elevation: 126 m (413 ft)
- Lowest elevation: 48 m (157 ft)
- Population (2023): 247
  - Density: 3.70/km^{2} (9.59/sq mi)
- Time zone: UTC+01:00 (CET)
  - Summer (DST): UTC+02:00 (CEST)
- INSEE/Postal code: 33255 /33840
- ^{1} French Land Register data, which excludes lakes, ponds, glaciers > 1 km^{2} (0.386 sq mi or 247 acres) and river estuaries.

Lucmau (French pronunciation: [lykmo]) is a commune in the Gironde department in Nouvelle-Aquitaine in southwestern France.

== Population ==
Historical population
| Year | Pop. | ±% p.a. |
|---|---|---|
| 1968 | 256 | — |
| 1975 | 186 | −4.46% |
| 1982 | 188 | +0.15% |
| 1990 | 199 | +0.71% |
| 1999 | 208 | +0.49% |
| 2007 | 235 | +1.54% |
| 2012 | 210 | −2.22% |
| 2017 | 241 | +2.79% |
| 2023 | 247 | +0.41% |
Source: INSEE

== See also ==
- Communes of the Gironde department
- Parc naturel régional des Landes de Gascogne
