= Escaudes =

- Commune
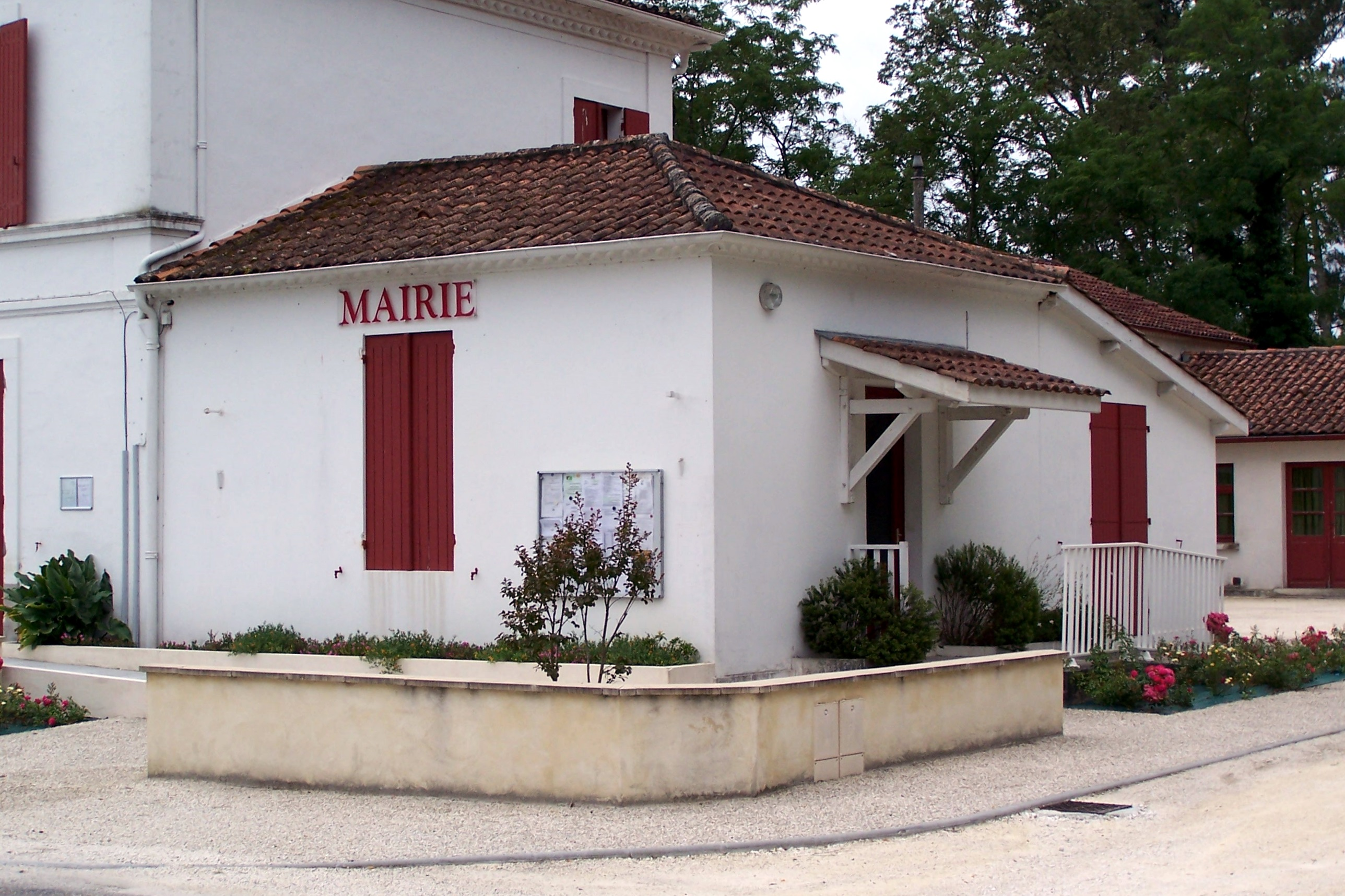
- Town hall
- Location of Escaudes
- Location within France Location within Nouvelle-Aquitaine
- Coordinates: 44°18′37″N 0°12′04″W
- Country: France
- Region: Nouvelle-Aquitaine
- Department: Gironde
- Arrondissement: Langon
- Canton: Le Sud-Gironde
- Intercommunality: Bazadais

Government
  - Mayor (2022–2026): Philippe Monnier
- Area^{1}: 25.77 km^{2} (9.95 sq mi)
- Elevation: 89 m (292 ft)
- Highest elevation: 107 m (351 ft)
- Lowest elevation: 60 m (200 ft)
- Population (2023): 171
  - Density: 6.64/km^{2} (17.2/sq mi)
- Time zone: UTC+01:00 (CET)
  - Summer (DST): UTC+02:00 (CEST)
- INSEE/Postal code: 33155 /33840
- ^{1} French Land Register data, which excludes lakes, ponds, glaciers > 1 km^{2} (0.386 sq mi or 247 acres) and river estuaries.

Escaudes (French pronunciation: [ɛskod]; Occitan: Escaudas) is a commune in the Gironde department in southwestern France.

== Population ==
Historical population
| Year | Pop. | ±% p.a. |
|---|---|---|
| 1968 | 230 | — |
| 1975 | 197 | −2.19% |
| 1982 | 175 | −1.68% |
| 1990 | 172 | −0.22% |
| 1999 | 167 | −0.33% |
| 2007 | 138 | −2.36% |
| 2012 | 152 | +1.95% |
| 2017 | 153 | +0.13% |
| 2023 | 171 | +1.87% |
Source: INSEE

== See also ==
- Communes of the Gironde department
