= Gans, Gironde =

Gans
- Commune
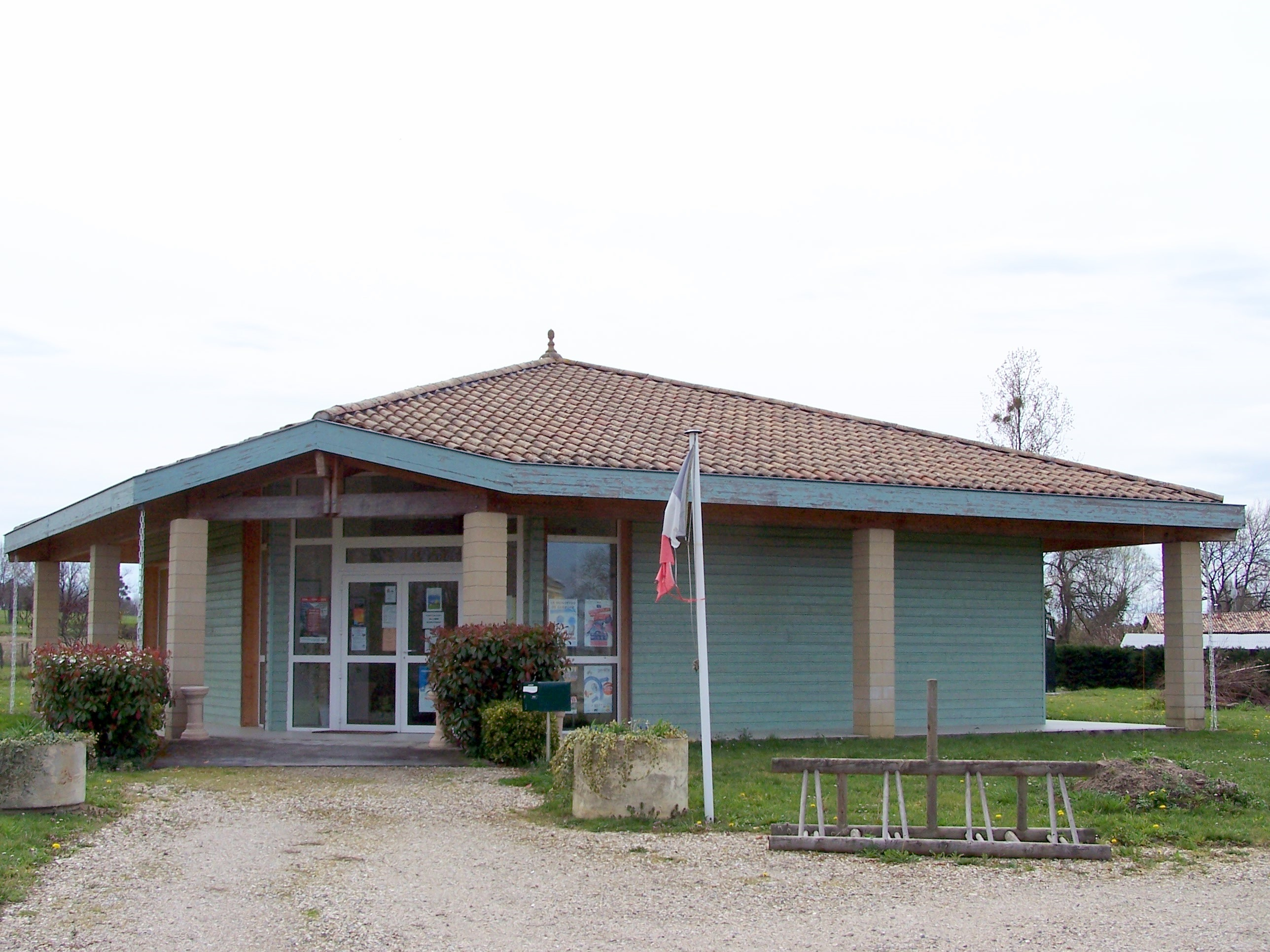
- Town hall
- Location of Gans
- Location within France Location within Nouvelle-Aquitaine
- Coordinates: 44°27′23″N 0°08′44″W
- Country: France
- Region: Nouvelle-Aquitaine
- Department: Gironde
- Arrondissement: Langon
- Canton: Le Sud-Gironde
- Intercommunality: Bazadais

Government
  - Mayor (2020–2026): Laurent Belloc
- Area^{1}: 7.01 km^{2} (2.71 sq mi)
- Elevation: 97 m (318 ft)
- Highest elevation: 134 m (440 ft)
- Lowest elevation: 35 m (115 ft)
- Population (2023): 207
  - Density: 29.5/km^{2} (76.5/sq mi)
- Time zone: UTC+01:00 (CET)
  - Summer (DST): UTC+02:00 (CEST)
- INSEE/Postal code: 33180 /33430
- ^{1} French Land Register data, which excludes lakes, ponds, glaciers > 1 km^{2} (0.386 sq mi or 247 acres) and river estuaries.

Gans is a commune in the Gironde department in southwestern France.

== Population ==
Historical population
Year	Pop.	±% p.a.
1968	222	—
1975	184	−2.65%
1982	171	−1.04%
1990	152	−1.46%
1999	158	+0.43%
2007	186	+2.06%
2012	193	+0.74%
2017	188	−0.52%
2023	207	+1.62%
Source: INSEE

== See also ==
- Communes of the Gironde department
