= Canton of Le Sud-Gironde =

Coordinates: 44.55°N 0.25°W

The canton of Le Sud-Gironde is an administrative division of the Gironde department, southwestern France. It was created at the French canton reorganisation which came into effect in March 2015. Its seat is in Langon.

It consists of the following communes:

1. Aubiac
2. Bazas
3. Bernos-Beaulac
4. Bieujac
5. Birac
6. Bommes
7. Bourideys
8. Captieux
9. Castets et Castillon
10. Cauvignac
11. Cazalis
12. Cazats
13. Cours-les-Bains
14. Cudos
15. Escaudes
16. Fargues
17. Gajac
18. Gans
19. Giscos
20. Goualade
21. Grignols
22. Labescau
23. Langon
24. Lartigue
25. Lavazan
26. Léogeats
27. Lerm-et-Musset
28. Lignan-de-Bazas
29. Lucmau
30. Marimbault
31. Marions
32. Masseilles
33. Mazères
34. Le Nizan
35. Noaillan
36. Pompéjac
37. Préchac
38. Roaillan
39. Saint-Côme
40. Saint-Loubert
41. Saint-Michel-de-Castelnau
42. Saint-Pardon-de-Conques
43. Saint-Pierre-de-Mons
44. Sauternes
45. Sauviac
46. Sendets
47. Sillas
48. Toulenne
49. Uzeste
50. Villandraut
