= Goualade =

- Commune
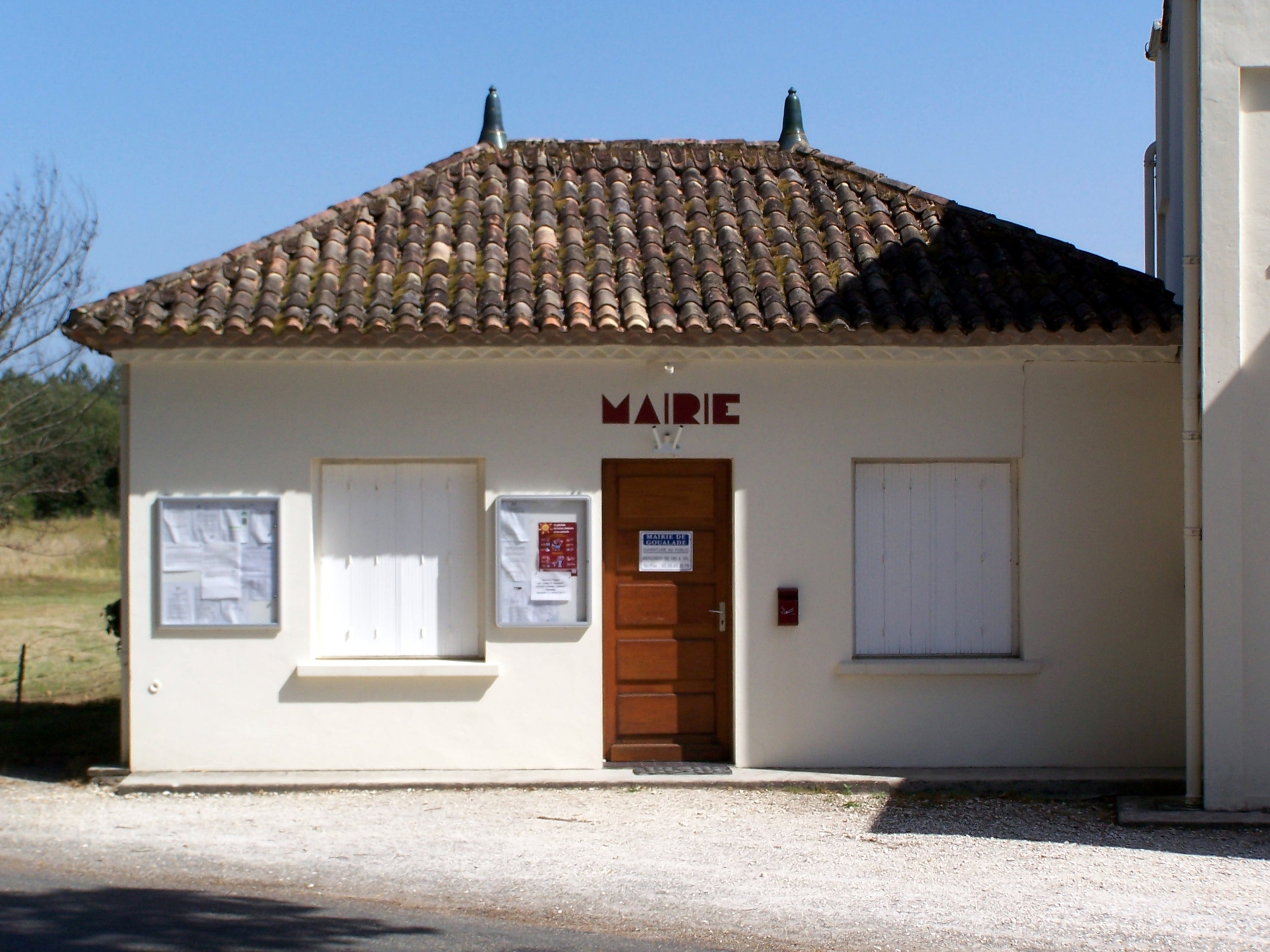
- Town hall
- Location of Goualade
- Location within France Location within Nouvelle-Aquitaine
- Coordinates: 44°18′45″N 0°08′35″W
- Country: France
- Region: Nouvelle-Aquitaine
- Department: Gironde
- Arrondissement: Langon
- Canton: Le Sud-Gironde
- Intercommunality: Bazadais

Government
  - Mayor (2020–2026): René Cardoit
- Area^{1}: 17 km^{2} (6.6 sq mi)
- Elevation: 138 m (453 ft)
- Highest elevation: 143 m (469 ft)
- Lowest elevation: 74 m (243 ft)
- Population (2023): 117
  - Density: 6.9/km^{2} (18/sq mi)
- Time zone: UTC+01:00 (CET)
  - Summer (DST): UTC+02:00 (CEST)
- INSEE/Postal code: 33190 /33840
- ^{1} French Land Register data, which excludes lakes, ponds, glaciers > 1 km^{2} (0.386 sq mi or 247 acres) and river estuaries.

Goualade (French pronunciation: [ɡwalad]; Occitan: Gualada) is a commune in the Gironde department in southwestern France.

== Population ==
Historical population
Year	Pop.	±% p.a.
1968	152	—
1975	115	−3.91%
1982	79	−5.22%
1990	76	−0.48%
1999	77	+0.15%
2007	81	+0.64%
2012	98	+3.88%
2017	91	−1.47%
2023	117	+4.28%
Source: INSEE

== See also ==
- Communes of the Gironde department
