= Bourideys =

- Commune
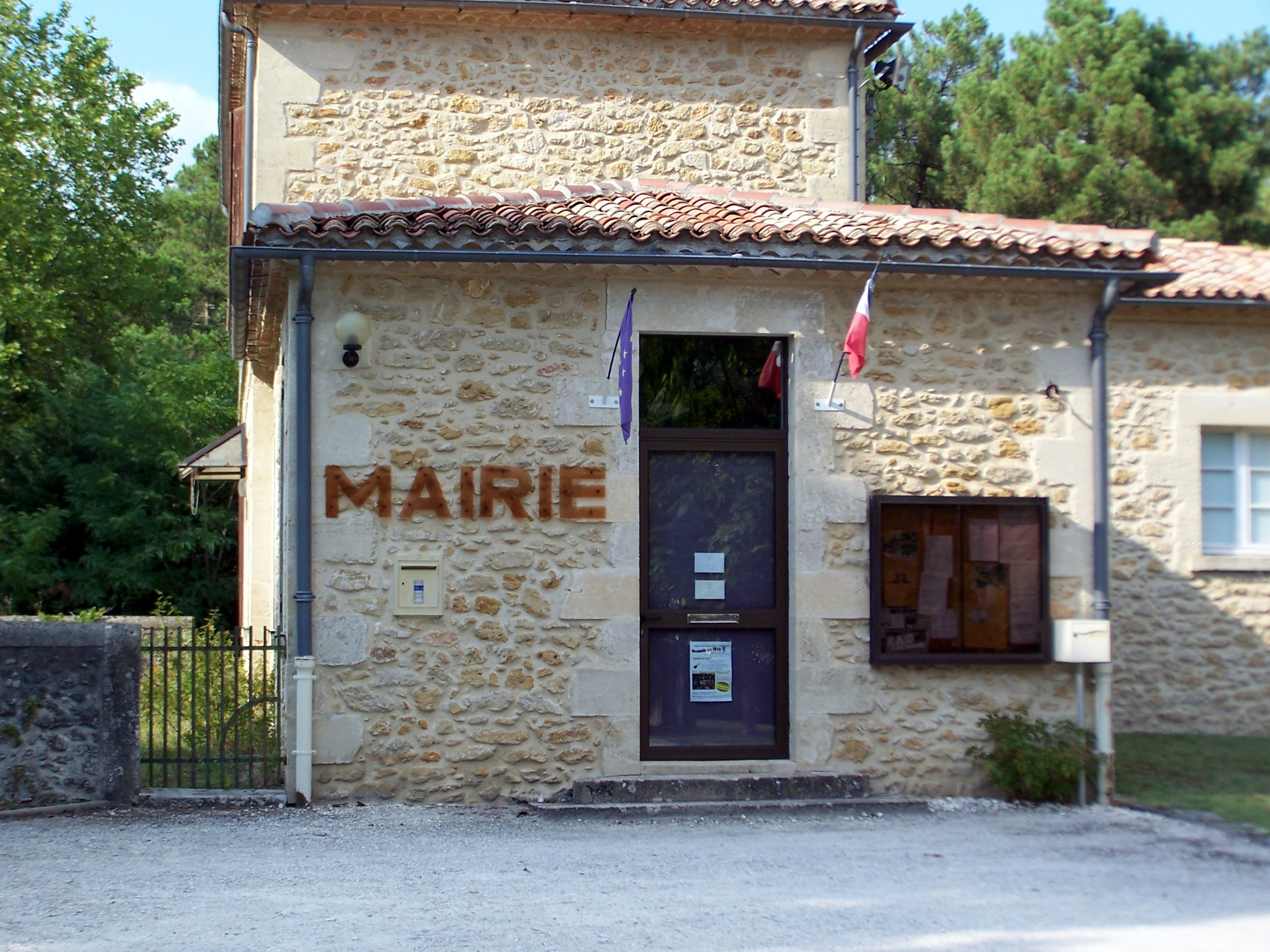
- Town hall

- Coat of arms
- Location of Bourideys
- Location within France Location within Nouvelle-Aquitaine
- Coordinates: 44°22′07″N 0°27′08″W
- Country: France
- Region: Nouvelle-Aquitaine
- Department: Gironde
- Arrondissement: Langon
- Canton: Le Sud-Gironde

Government
  - Mayor (2020–2026): Mireille Morlet
- Area^{1}: 48.44 km^{2} (18.70 sq mi)
- Elevation: 30 m (98 ft)
- Highest elevation: 101 m (331 ft)
- Lowest elevation: 62 m (203 ft)
- Population (2023): 98
  - Density: 2.0/km^{2} (5.2/sq mi)
- Time zone: UTC+01:00 (CET)
  - Summer (DST): UTC+02:00 (CEST)
- INSEE/Postal code: 33068 /33113
- ^{1} French Land Register data, which excludes lakes, ponds, glaciers > 1 km^{2} (0.386 sq mi or 247 acres) and river estuaries.

Bourideys is a commune in the Gironde department in Nouvelle-Aquitaine in southwestern France.

== Population ==
Historical population
Year	Pop.	±% p.a.
1968	86	—
1975	73	−2.31%
1982	76	+0.58%
1990	99	+3.36%
1999	84	−1.81%
2007	87	+0.44%
2012	86	−0.23%
2017	79	−1.68%
2023	98	+3.66%
Source: INSEE

== See also ==
- Communes of the Gironde department
- Parc naturel régional des Landes de Gascogne
