= Cauvignac =

- Commune
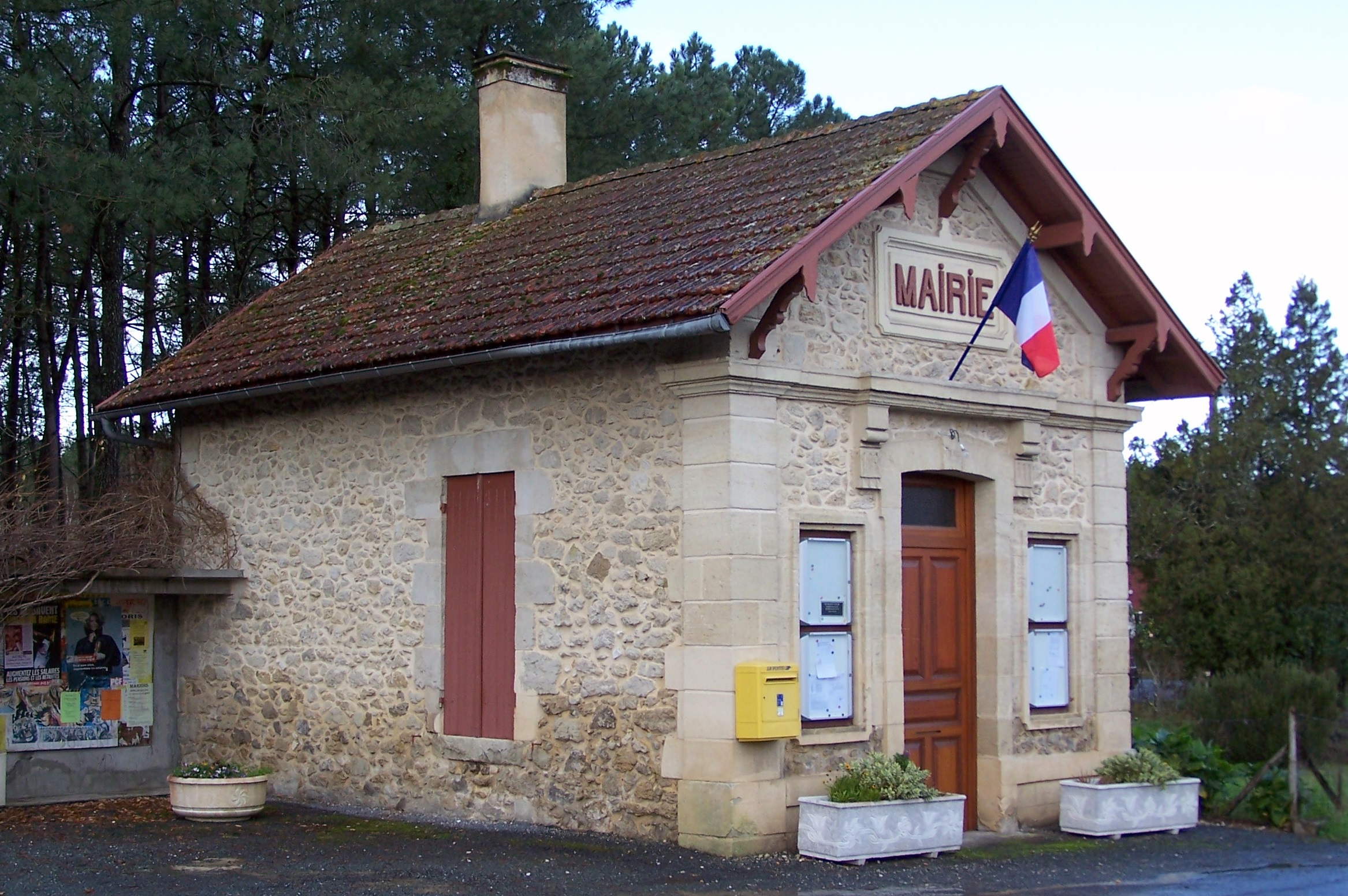
- Town hall
- Location of Cauvignac
- Location within France Location within Nouvelle-Aquitaine
- Coordinates: 44°25′08″N 0°04′42″W
- Country: France
- Region: Nouvelle-Aquitaine
- Department: Gironde
- Arrondissement: Langon
- Canton: Le Sud-Gironde
- Intercommunality: Bazadais

Government
  - Mayor (2020–2026): Nicole Coustet
- Area^{1}: 5.51 km^{2} (2.13 sq mi)
- Elevation: 145 m (476 ft)
- Highest elevation: 152 m (499 ft)
- Lowest elevation: 59 m (194 ft)
- Population (2023): 143
  - Density: 26.0/km^{2} (67.2/sq mi)
- Time zone: UTC+01:00 (CET)
  - Summer (DST): UTC+02:00 (CEST)
- INSEE/Postal code: 33113 /33690
- ^{1} French Land Register data, which excludes lakes, ponds, glaciers > 1 km^{2} (0.386 sq mi or 247 acres) and river estuaries.

Cauvignac (French pronunciation: [koviɲak]; Occitan: Cauvinhac) is a commune in the Gironde department in Nouvelle-Aquitaine in southwestern France.

== Population ==
Historical population
Year	Pop.	±% p.a.
1968	151	—
1975	148	−0.29%
1982	135	−1.30%
1990	110	−2.53%
1999	107	−0.31%
2007	126	+2.06%
2012	169	+6.05%
2017	169	+0.00%
2023	143	−2.75%
Source: INSEE

== See also ==
- Communes of the Gironde department
