= Lignan-de-Bazas =

- Commune
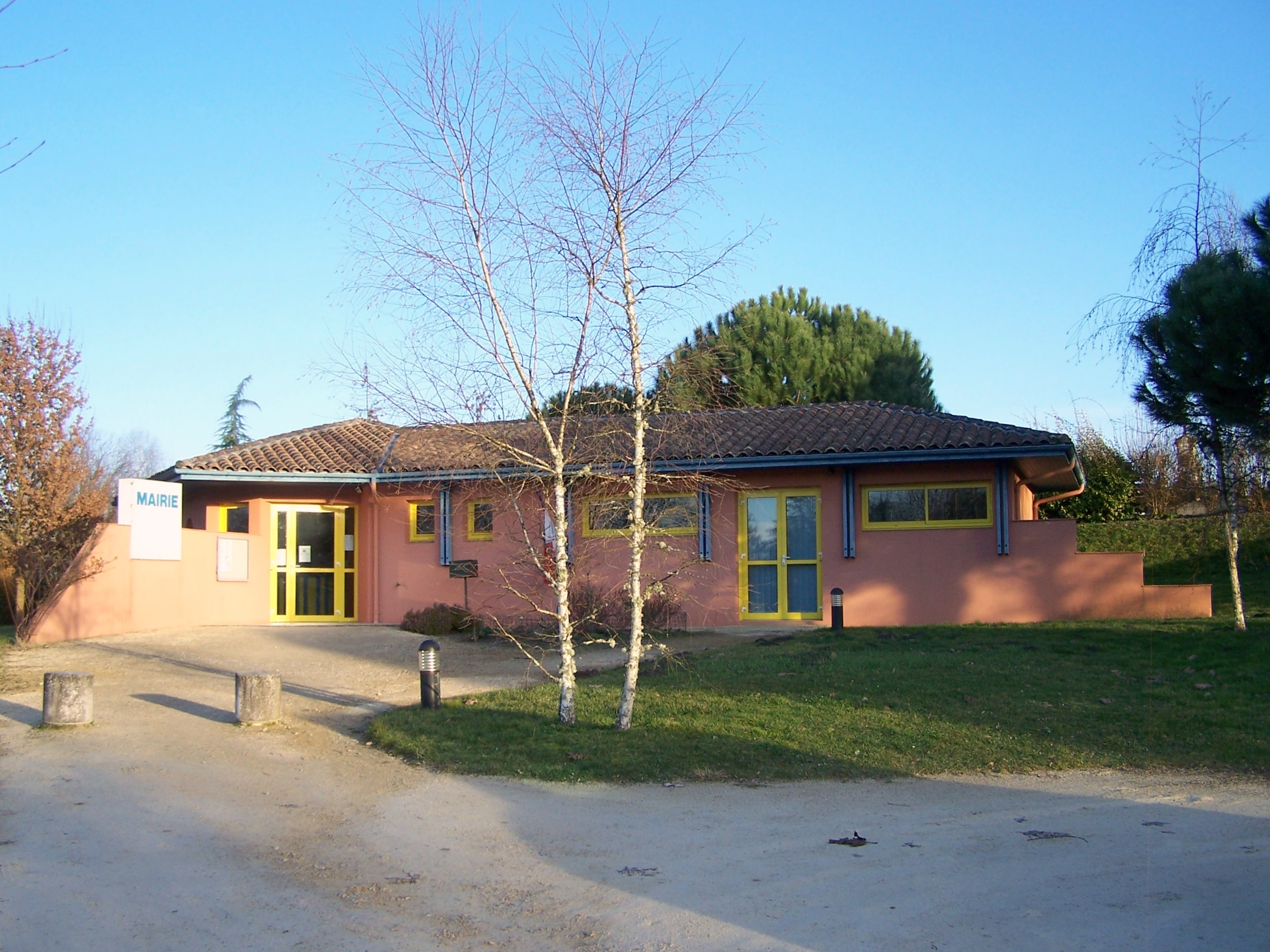
- Town hall
- Location of Lignan-de-Bazas
- Location within France Location within Nouvelle-Aquitaine
- Coordinates: 44°25′50″N 0°16′40″W
- Country: France
- Region: Nouvelle-Aquitaine
- Department: Gironde
- Arrondissement: Langon
- Canton: Le Sud-Gironde
- Intercommunality: Bazadais

Government
  - Mayor (2020–2026): Jacky Darthiail
- Area^{1}: 11.1 km^{2} (4.3 sq mi)
- Elevation: 100 m (330 ft)
- Highest elevation: 123 m (404 ft)
- Lowest elevation: 77 m (253 ft)
- Population (2023): 403
  - Density: 36.3/km^{2} (94.0/sq mi)
- Demonym(s): Lignanais, Lignanaises
- Time zone: UTC+01:00 (CET)
  - Summer (DST): UTC+02:00 (CEST)
- INSEE/Postal code: 33244 /33430
- ^{1} French Land Register data, which excludes lakes, ponds, glaciers > 1 km^{2} (0.386 sq mi or 247 acres) and river estuaries.

Lignan-de-Bazas (French pronunciation: [liɲɑ̃ də bazas], literally Lignan of Bazas; Occitan: Linhan de Vasats) is a commune in the Gironde department in Nouvelle-Aquitaine in southwestern France.

== Population ==
Historical population
Year	Pop.	±% p.a.
1968	215	—
1975	234	+1.22%
1982	219	−0.94%
1990	236	+0.94%
1999	245	+0.42%
2007	251	+0.30%
2012	340	+6.26%
2017	409	+3.76%
2023	403	−0.25%
Source: INSEE

== See also ==
- Communes of the Gironde department
