= Le Nizan =

- Commune
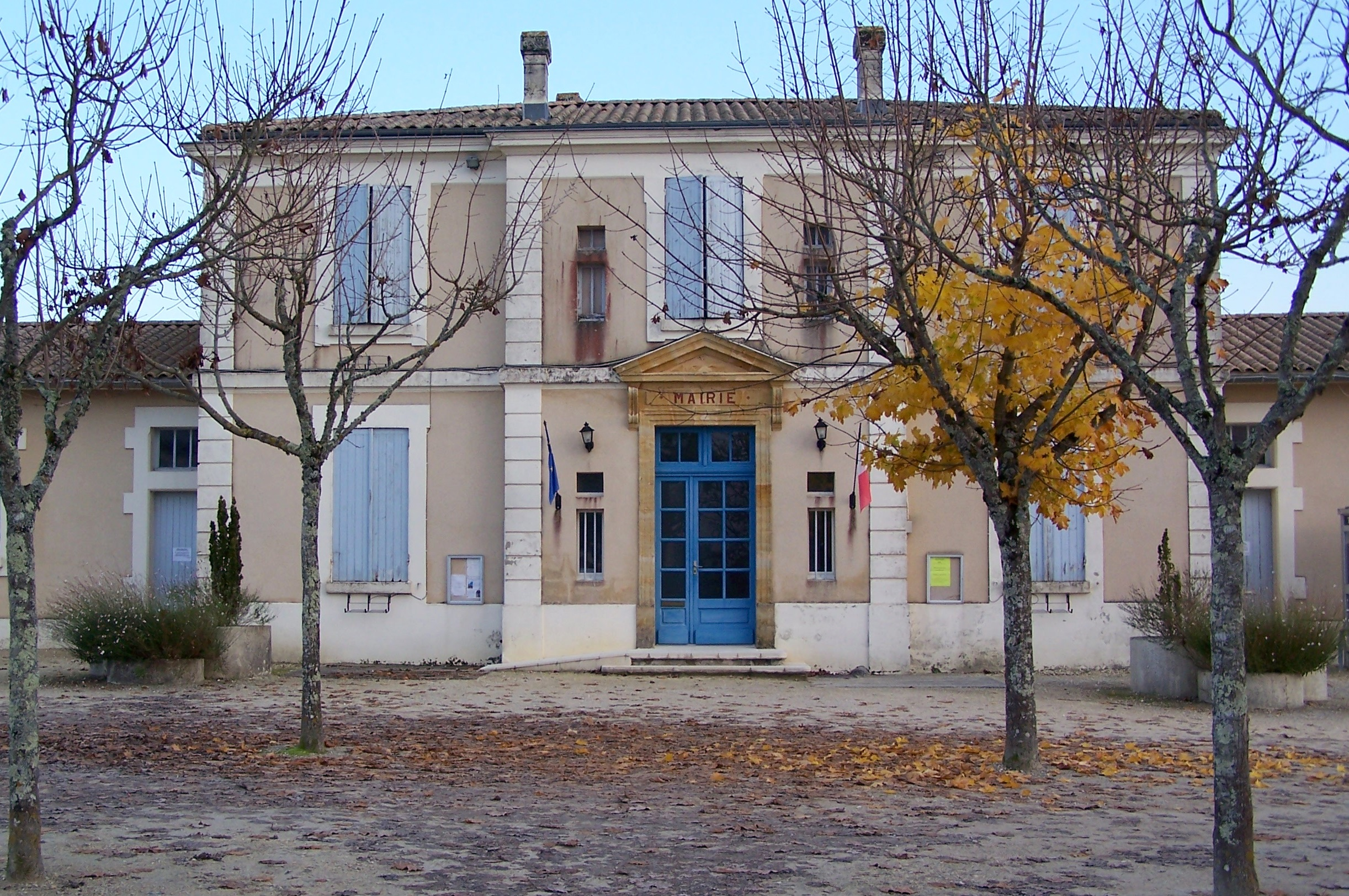
- Town hall
- Location of Le Nizan
- Location within France Location within Nouvelle-Aquitaine
- Coordinates: 44°28′42″N 0°16′07″W
- Country: France
- Region: Nouvelle-Aquitaine
- Department: Gironde
- Arrondissement: Langon
- Canton: Le Sud-Gironde
- Intercommunality: Bazadais

Government
  - Mayor (2020–2026): Michelle Labrouche
- Area^{1}: 15.21 km^{2} (5.87 sq mi)
- Elevation: 104 m (341 ft)
- Highest elevation: 115 m (377 ft)
- Lowest elevation: 41 m (135 ft)
- Population (2023): 506
  - Density: 33.3/km^{2} (86.2/sq mi)
- Time zone: UTC+01:00 (CET)
  - Summer (DST): UTC+02:00 (CEST)
- INSEE/Postal code: 33305 /33430
- ^{1} French Land Register data, which excludes lakes, ponds, glaciers > 1 km^{2} (0.386 sq mi or 247 acres) and river estuaries.

Le Nizan (French pronunciation: [lə nizɑ̃]; Occitan: Lo Nisan) is a commune in the Gironde department in Nouvelle-Aquitaine in southwestern France.

== Population ==
Historical population
| Year | Pop. | ±% p.a. |
|---|---|---|
| 1968 | 338 | — |
| 1975 | 297 | −1.83% |
| 1982 | 289 | −0.39% |
| 1990 | 312 | +0.96% |
| 1999 | 349 | +1.25% |
| 2007 | 420 | +2.34% |
| 2012 | 437 | +0.80% |
| 2017 | 520 | +3.54% |
| 2023 | 506 | −0.45% |
Source: INSEE

== See also ==
- Communes of the Gironde department
