= Masseilles =

- Commune
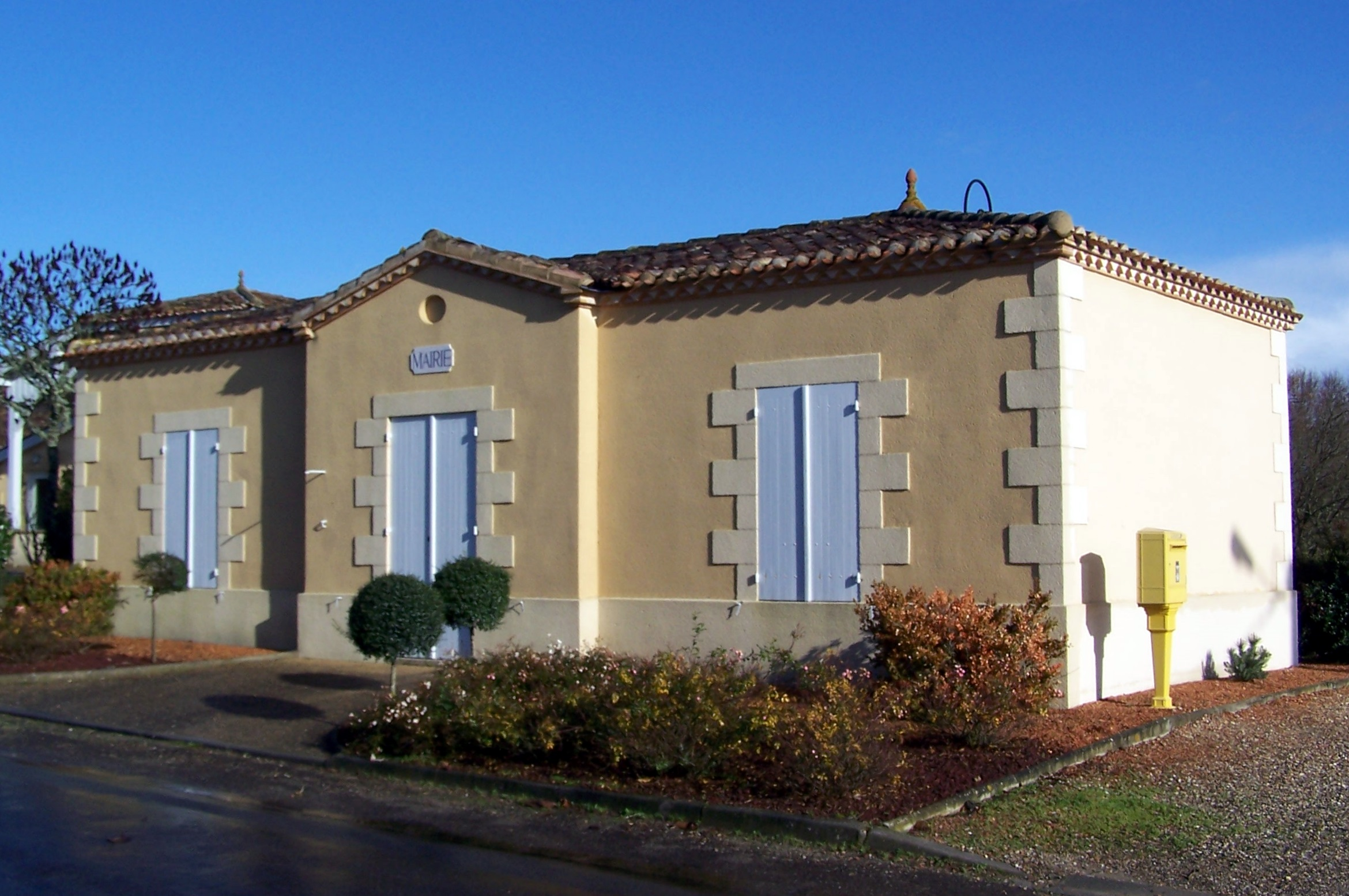
- Town hall
- Location of Masseilles
- Location within France Location within Nouvelle-Aquitaine
- Coordinates: 44°24′27″N 0°03′13″W
- Country: France
- Region: Nouvelle-Aquitaine
- Department: Gironde
- Arrondissement: Langon
- Canton: Le Sud-Gironde
- Intercommunality: Bazadais

Government
  - Mayor (2020–2026): Nicole Vigne
- Area^{1}: 6.72 km^{2} (2.59 sq mi)
- Elevation: 139 m (456 ft)
- Highest elevation: 152 m (499 ft)
- Lowest elevation: 60 m (200 ft)
- Population (2023): 136
  - Density: 20.2/km^{2} (52.4/sq mi)
- Time zone: UTC+01:00 (CET)
  - Summer (DST): UTC+02:00 (CEST)
- INSEE/Postal code: 33276 /33690
- ^{1} French Land Register data, which excludes lakes, ponds, glaciers > 1 km^{2} (0.386 sq mi or 247 acres) and river estuaries.

Masseilles (French pronunciation: [masɛj]; Occitan: Macelhas) is a commune in the Gironde department in Nouvelle-Aquitaine in southwestern France.

== Population ==
Historical population
| Year | Pop. | ±% p.a. |
|---|---|---|
| 1968 | 171 | — |
| 1975 | 150 | −1.85% |
| 1982 | 152 | +0.19% |
| 1990 | 138 | −1.20% |
| 1999 | 119 | −1.63% |
| 2007 | 121 | +0.21% |
| 2012 | 139 | +2.81% |
| 2017 | 145 | +0.85% |
| 2023 | 136 | −1.06% |
Source: INSEE

== See also ==
- Communes of the Gironde department
