= Giscos =

- Commune
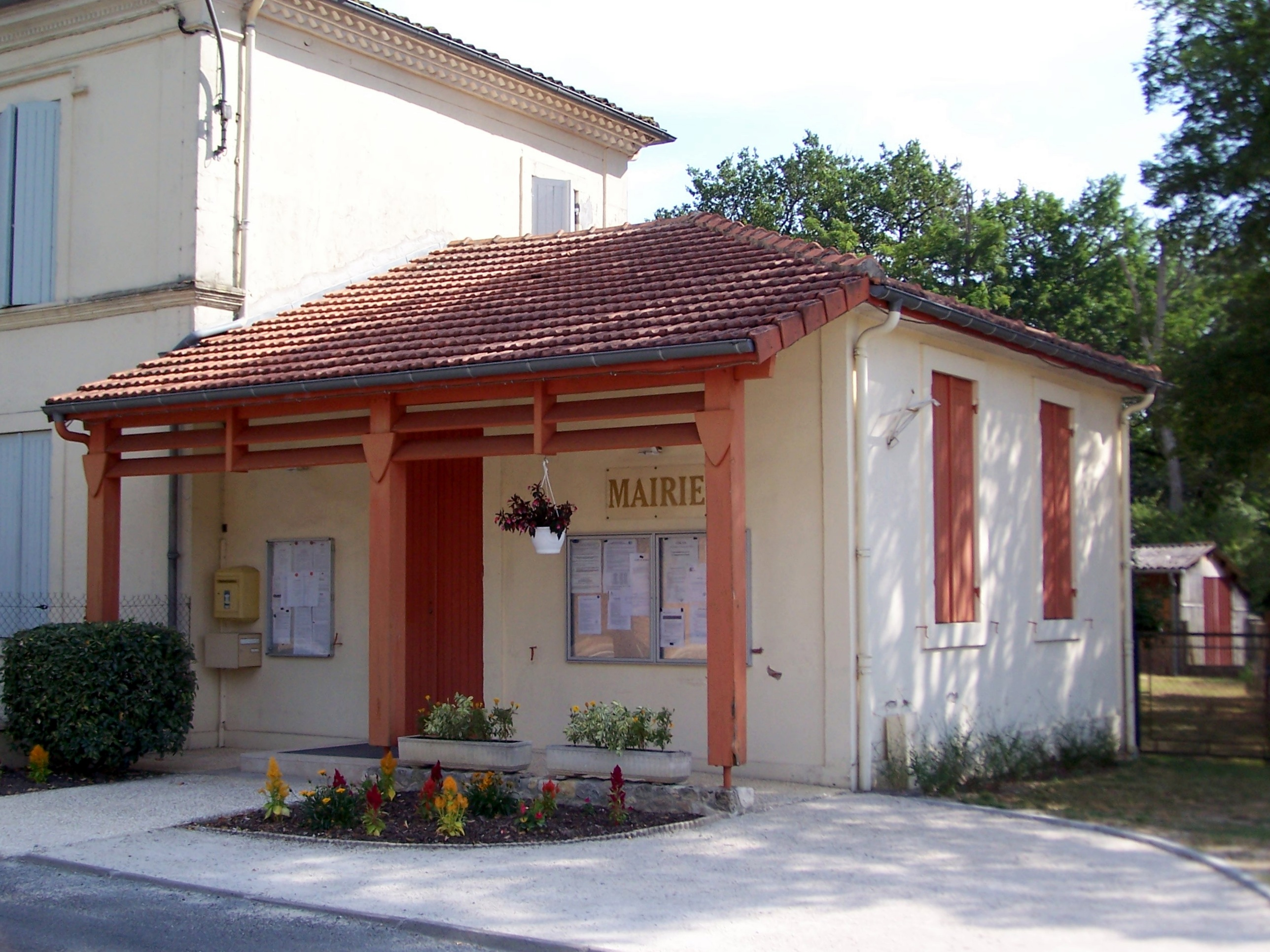
- Town hall
- Location of Giscos
- Location within France Location within Nouvelle-Aquitaine
- Coordinates: 44°16′25″N 0°10′22″W
- Country: France
- Region: Nouvelle-Aquitaine
- Department: Gironde
- Arrondissement: Langon
- Canton: Le Sud-Gironde
- Intercommunality: Bazadais

Government
  - Mayor (2020–2026): Fabienne Barbot
- Area^{1}: 32.06 km^{2} (12.38 sq mi)
- Elevation: 95 m (312 ft)
- Highest elevation: 128 m (420 ft)
- Lowest elevation: 75 m (246 ft)
- Population (2023): 183
  - Density: 5.71/km^{2} (14.8/sq mi)
- Time zone: UTC+01:00 (CET)
  - Summer (DST): UTC+02:00 (CEST)
- INSEE/Postal code: 33188 /33840
- ^{1} French Land Register data, which excludes lakes, ponds, glaciers > 1 km^{2} (0.386 sq mi or 247 acres) and river estuaries.

Giscos is a commune in the Gironde department in southwestern France.

== Population ==
Historical population
Year	Pop.	±% p.a.
1968	210	—
1975	188	−1.57%
1982	197	+0.67%
1990	172	−1.68%
1999	171	−0.06%
2007	184	+0.92%
2012	215	+3.16%
2017	180	−3.49%
2023	183	+0.28%
Source: INSEE

== See also ==
- Communes of the Gironde department
