= Labescau =

- Commune
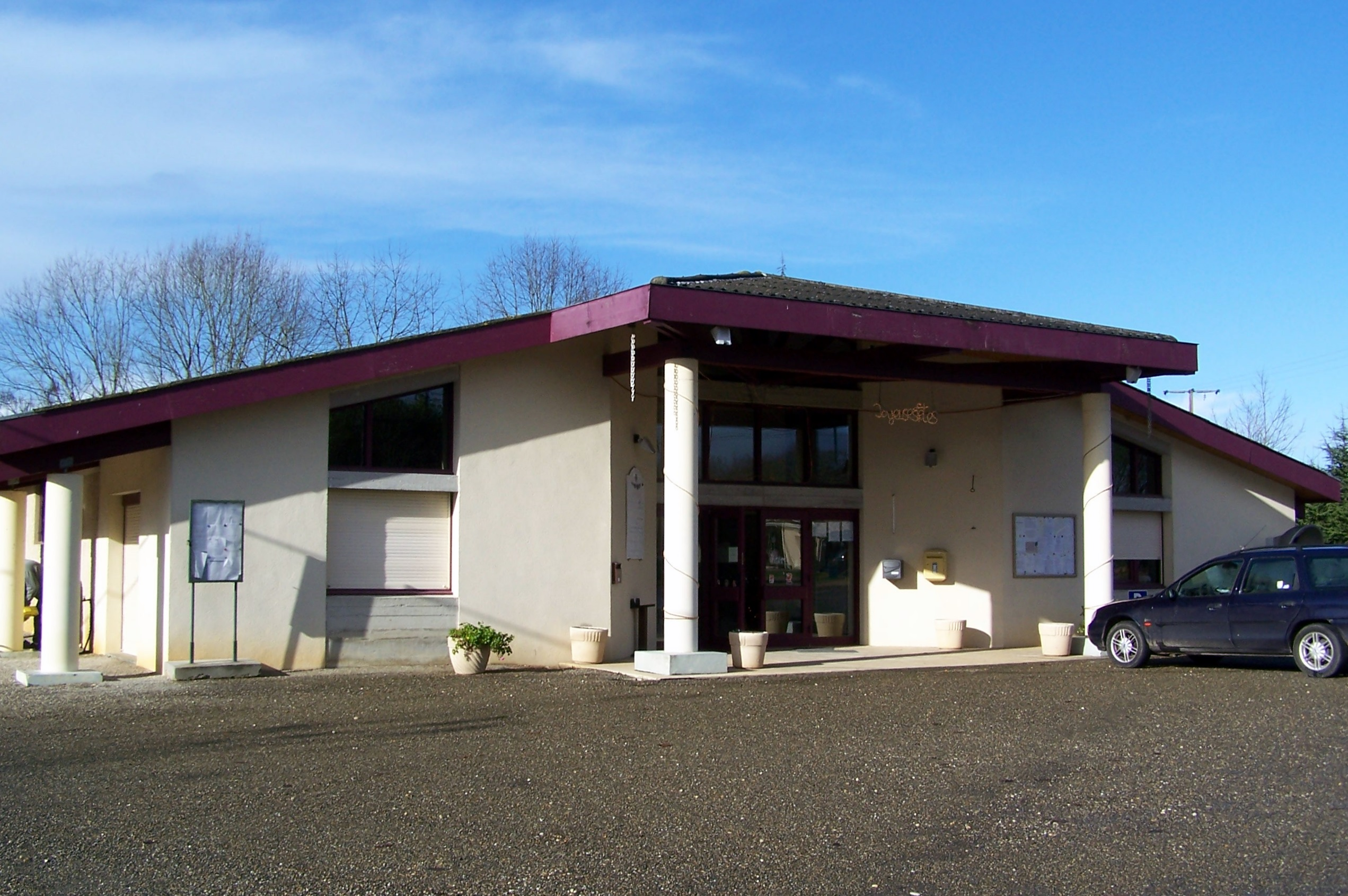
- Town hall

- Coat of arms
- Location of Labescau
- Location within France Location within Nouvelle-Aquitaine
- Coordinates: 44°27′06″N 0°05′15″W
- Country: France
- Region: Nouvelle-Aquitaine
- Department: Gironde
- Arrondissement: Langon
- Canton: Le Sud-Gironde
- Intercommunality: Bazadais

Government
  - Mayor (2020–2026): Denis Espagnet
- Area^{1}: 5.99 km^{2} (2.31 sq mi)
- Elevation: 135 m (443 ft)
- Highest elevation: 141 m (463 ft)
- Lowest elevation: 63 m (207 ft)
- Population (2023): 140
  - Density: 23/km^{2} (61/sq mi)
- Time zone: UTC+01:00 (CET)
  - Summer (DST): UTC+02:00 (CEST)
- INSEE/Postal code: 33212 /33690
- ^{1} French Land Register data, which excludes lakes, ponds, glaciers > 1 km^{2} (0.386 sq mi or 247 acres) and river estuaries.

Labescau (French pronunciation: [labɛsko]; Occitan: L'Abescau) is a commune in the Gironde department in Nouvelle-Aquitaine in southwestern France.

== Population ==
Historical population
Year	Pop.	±% p.a.
1968	104	—
1975	84	−3.00%
1982	78	−1.05%
1990	87	+1.37%
1999	98	+1.33%
2007	101	+0.38%
2012	105	+0.78%
2017	117	+2.19%
2023	140	+3.04%
Source: INSEE

== See also ==
- Communes of the Gironde department
