= Gajac, Gironde =

Gajac
- Commune
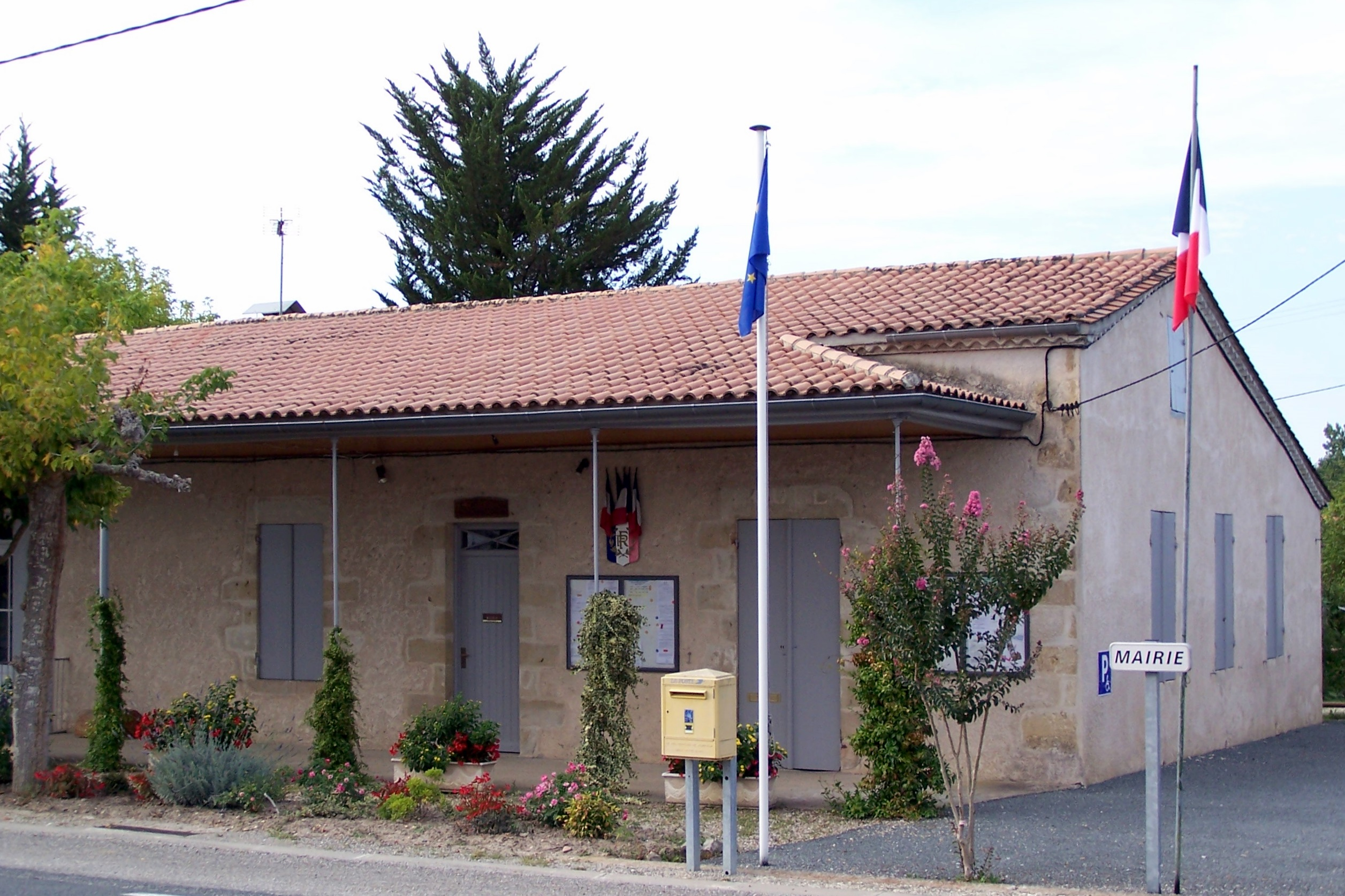
- Town hall
- Location of Gajac
- Location within France Location within Nouvelle-Aquitaine
- Coordinates: 44°26′15″N 0°07′43″W
- Country: France
- Region: Nouvelle-Aquitaine
- Department: Gironde
- Arrondissement: Langon
- Canton: Le Sud-Gironde
- Intercommunality: Bazadais

Government
  - Mayor (2020–2026): Pascal Losse
- Area^{1}: 12.28 km^{2} (4.74 sq mi)
- Elevation: 132 m (433 ft)
- Highest elevation: 144 m (472 ft)
- Lowest elevation: 36 m (118 ft)
- Population (2023): 367
  - Density: 29.9/km^{2} (77.4/sq mi)
- Time zone: UTC+01:00 (CET)
  - Summer (DST): UTC+02:00 (CEST)
- INSEE/Postal code: 33178 /33430
- ^{1} French Land Register data, which excludes lakes, ponds, glaciers > 1 km^{2} (0.386 sq mi or 247 acres) and river estuaries.

Gajac (French pronunciation: [ɡaʒak]) is a commune in the Gironde department in southwestern France.

== Population ==
Historical population
Year	Pop.	±% p.a.
1968	336	—
1975	335	−0.04%
1982	330	−0.21%
1990	363	+1.20%
1999	323	−1.29%
2007	381	+2.09%
2012	387	+0.31%
2017	380	−0.36%
2023	367	−0.58%
Source: INSEE

== See also ==
- Communes of the Gironde department
