= Lavazan =

- Commune
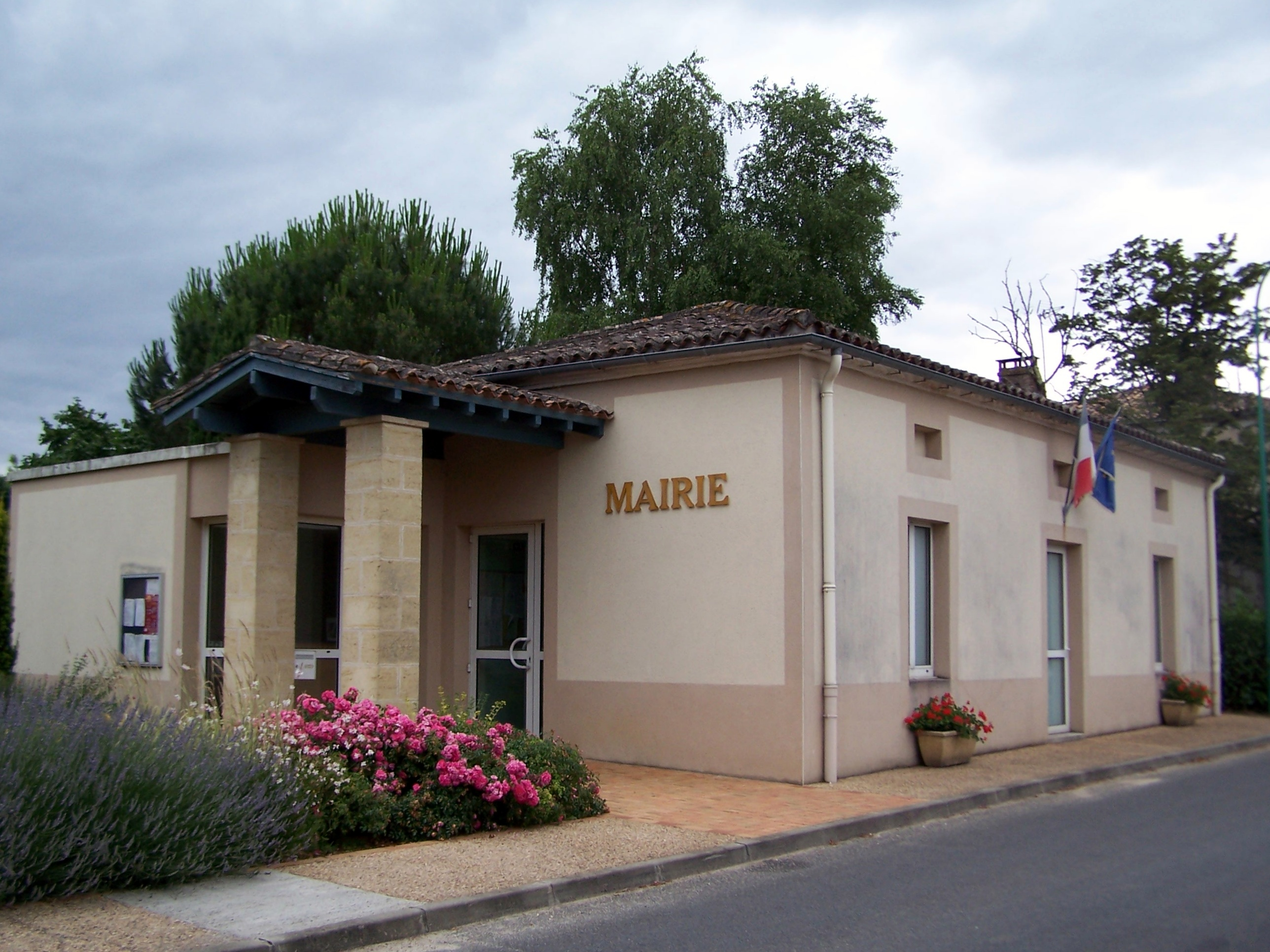
- Town hall
- Location of Lavazan
- Location within France Location within Nouvelle-Aquitaine
- Coordinates: 44°23′39″N 0°06′28″W
- Country: France
- Region: Nouvelle-Aquitaine
- Department: Gironde
- Arrondissement: Langon
- Canton: Le Sud-Gironde
- Intercommunality: Bazadais

Government
  - Mayor (2020–2026): Henrique Chanfrante
- Area^{1}: 8.97 km^{2} (3.46 sq mi)
- Elevation: 117 m (384 ft)
- Highest elevation: 143 m (469 ft)
- Lowest elevation: 87 m (285 ft)
- Population (2023): 228
  - Density: 25.4/km^{2} (65.8/sq mi)
- Time zone: UTC+01:00 (CET)
  - Summer (DST): UTC+02:00 (CEST)
- INSEE/Postal code: 33235 /33690
- ^{1} French Land Register data, which excludes lakes, ponds, glaciers > 1 km^{2} (0.386 sq mi or 247 acres) and river estuaries.

Lavazan (French pronunciation: [lavazɑ̃]; Occitan: Lavasan) is a commune in the Gironde department in Nouvelle-Aquitaine in southwestern France.

== Population ==
Historical population
Year	Pop.	±% p.a.
1968	216	—
1975	184	−2.26%
1982	164	−1.63%
1990	171	+0.52%
1999	179	+0.51%
2007	216	+2.38%
2012	245	+2.55%
2017	227	−1.51%
2023	228	+0.07%
Source: INSEE

== See also ==
- Communes of the Gironde department
