= Saint-Loubert =

- Commune
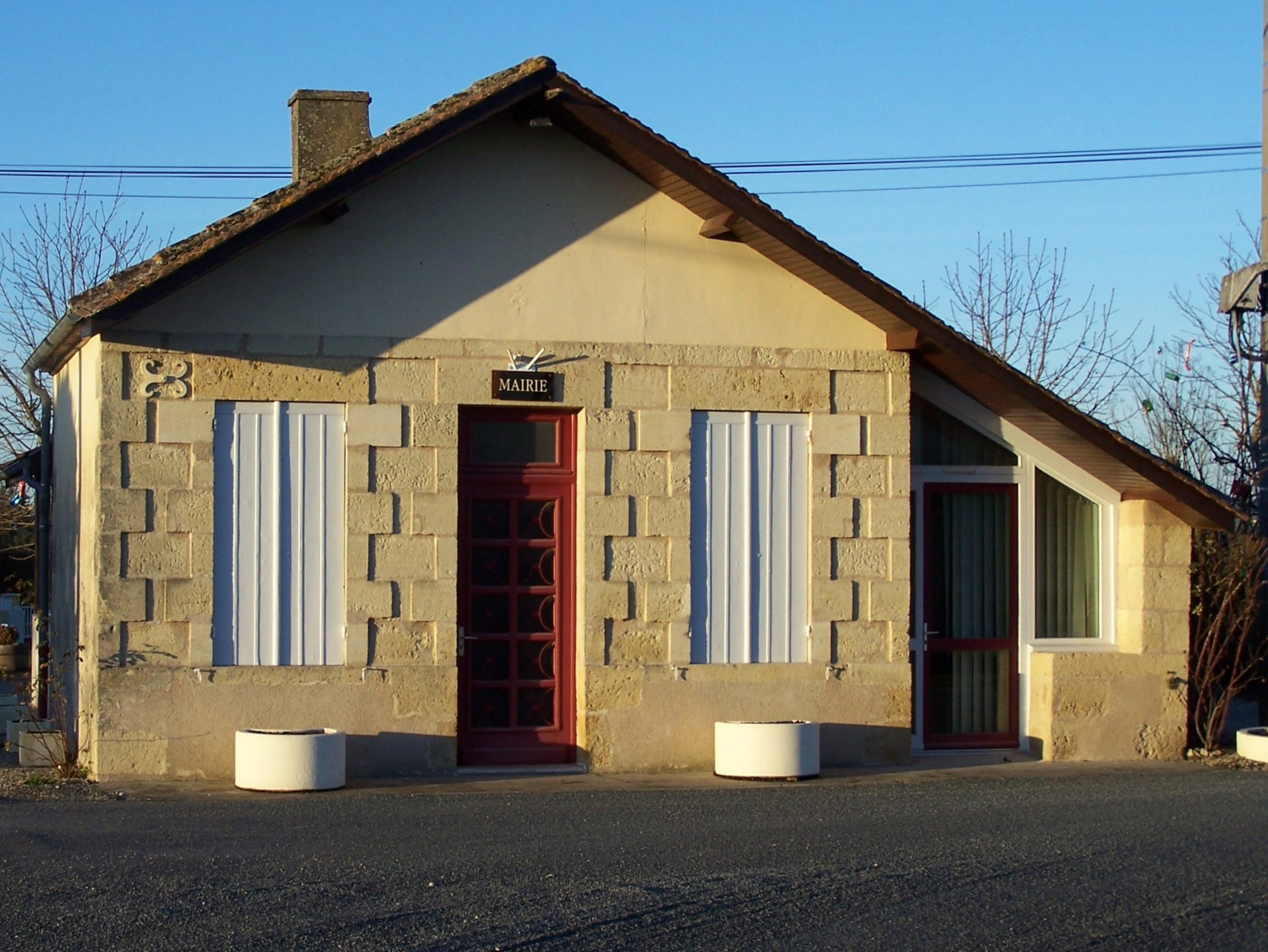
- Town hall
- Location of Saint-Loubert
- Location within France Location within Nouvelle-Aquitaine
- Coordinates: 44°33′37″N 0°10′28″W
- Country: France
- Region: Nouvelle-Aquitaine
- Department: Gironde
- Arrondissement: Langon
- Canton: Le Sud-Gironde

Government
  - Mayor (2021–2026): Christopher Latapy
- Area^{1}: 2.11 km^{2} (0.81 sq mi)
- Elevation: 41 m (135 ft)
- Highest elevation: 46 m (151 ft)
- Lowest elevation: 10 m (33 ft)
- Population (2023): 224
  - Density: 106/km^{2} (275/sq mi)
- Time zone: UTC+01:00 (CET)
  - Summer (DST): UTC+02:00 (CEST)
- INSEE/Postal code: 33432 /33210
- ^{1} French Land Register data, which excludes lakes, ponds, glaciers > 1 km^{2} (0.386 sq mi or 247 acres) and river estuaries.

Saint-Loubert (French pronunciation: [sɛ̃ lubɛʁ]; Gascon: Sent Lobèrt) is a commune in the Gironde department in Nouvelle-Aquitaine in southwestern France.

== Population ==
Historical population
Year	Pop.	±% p.a.
1968	126	—
1975	122	−0.46%
1982	114	−0.96%
1990	103	−1.26%
1999	129	+2.53%
2007	171	+3.59%
2012	213	+4.49%
2017	228	+1.37%
2023	224	−0.29%
Source: INSEE

== See also ==
- Communes of the Gironde department
