= Saint-Pardon-de-Conques =

- Commune
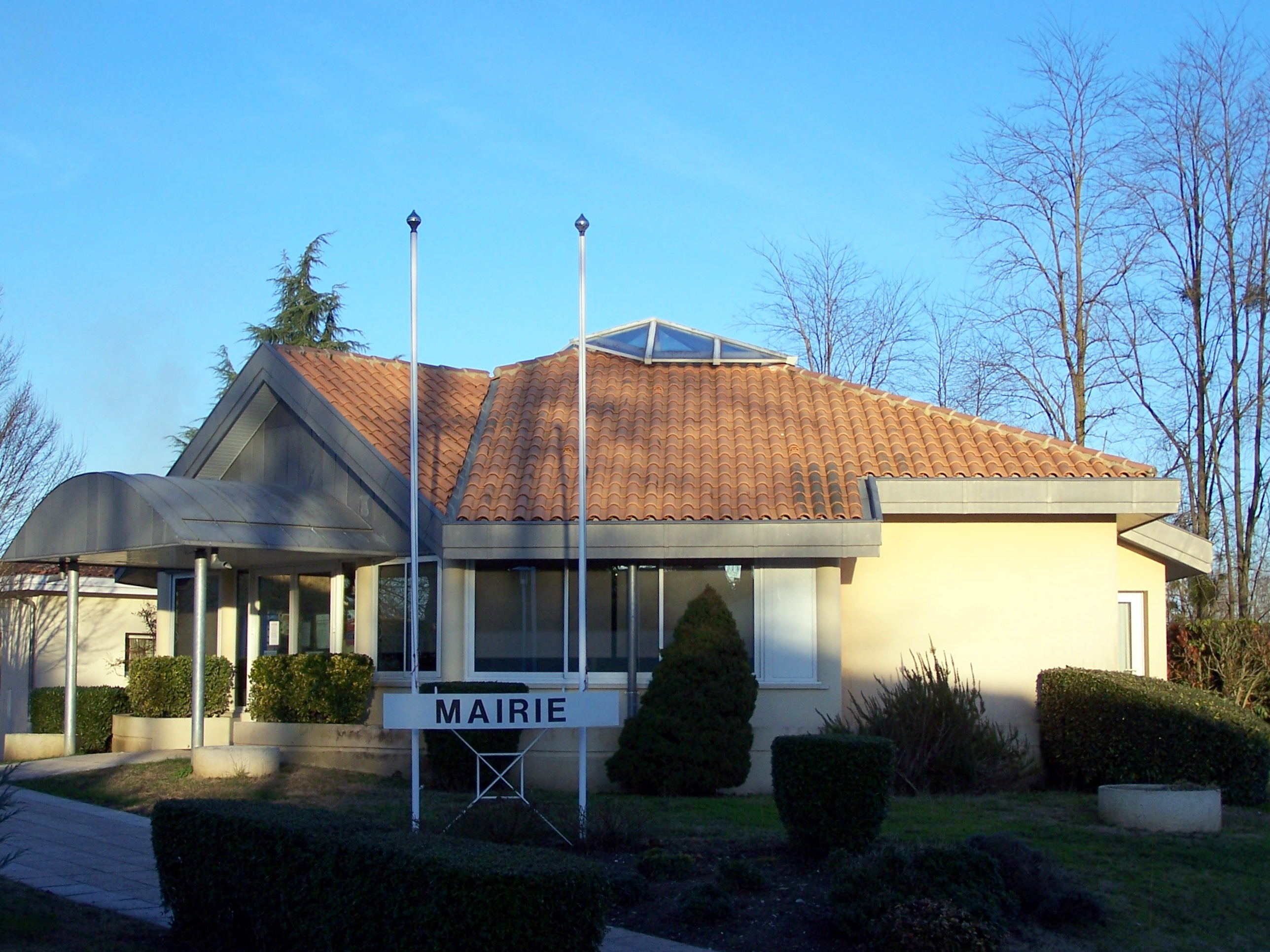
- Town hall
- Location of Saint-Pardon-de-Conques
- Location within France Location within Nouvelle-Aquitaine
- Coordinates: 44°33′18″N 0°10′48″W
- Country: France
- Region: Nouvelle-Aquitaine
- Department: Gironde
- Arrondissement: Langon
- Canton: Le Sud-Gironde

Government
  - Mayor (2020–2026): Gilbert Blangero
- Area^{1}: 6.68 km^{2} (2.58 sq mi)
- Elevation: 20 m (66 ft)
- Highest elevation: 54 m (177 ft)
- Lowest elevation: 0 m (0 ft)
- Population (2023): 663
  - Density: 99.3/km^{2} (257/sq mi)
- Time zone: UTC+01:00 (CET)
  - Summer (DST): UTC+02:00 (CEST)
- INSEE/Postal code: 33457 /33210
- ^{1} French Land Register data, which excludes lakes, ponds, glaciers > 1 km^{2} (0.386 sq mi or 247 acres) and river estuaries.

Saint-Pardon-de-Conques (French pronunciation: [sɛ̃ paʁdɔ̃ də kɔ̃k]; Occitan: Sant Pardons de Conques) is a commune in the Gironde department in Nouvelle-Aquitaine in southwestern France.

== Population ==
Historical population
Year	Pop.	±% p.a.
1968	197	—
1975	189	−0.59%
1982	235	+3.16%
1990	361	+5.51%
1999	393	+0.95%
2007	503	+3.13%
2012	565	+2.35%
2017	579	+0.49%
2023	663	+2.28%
Source: INSEE

== See also ==
- Communes of the Gironde department
