= Roaillan =

- Commune
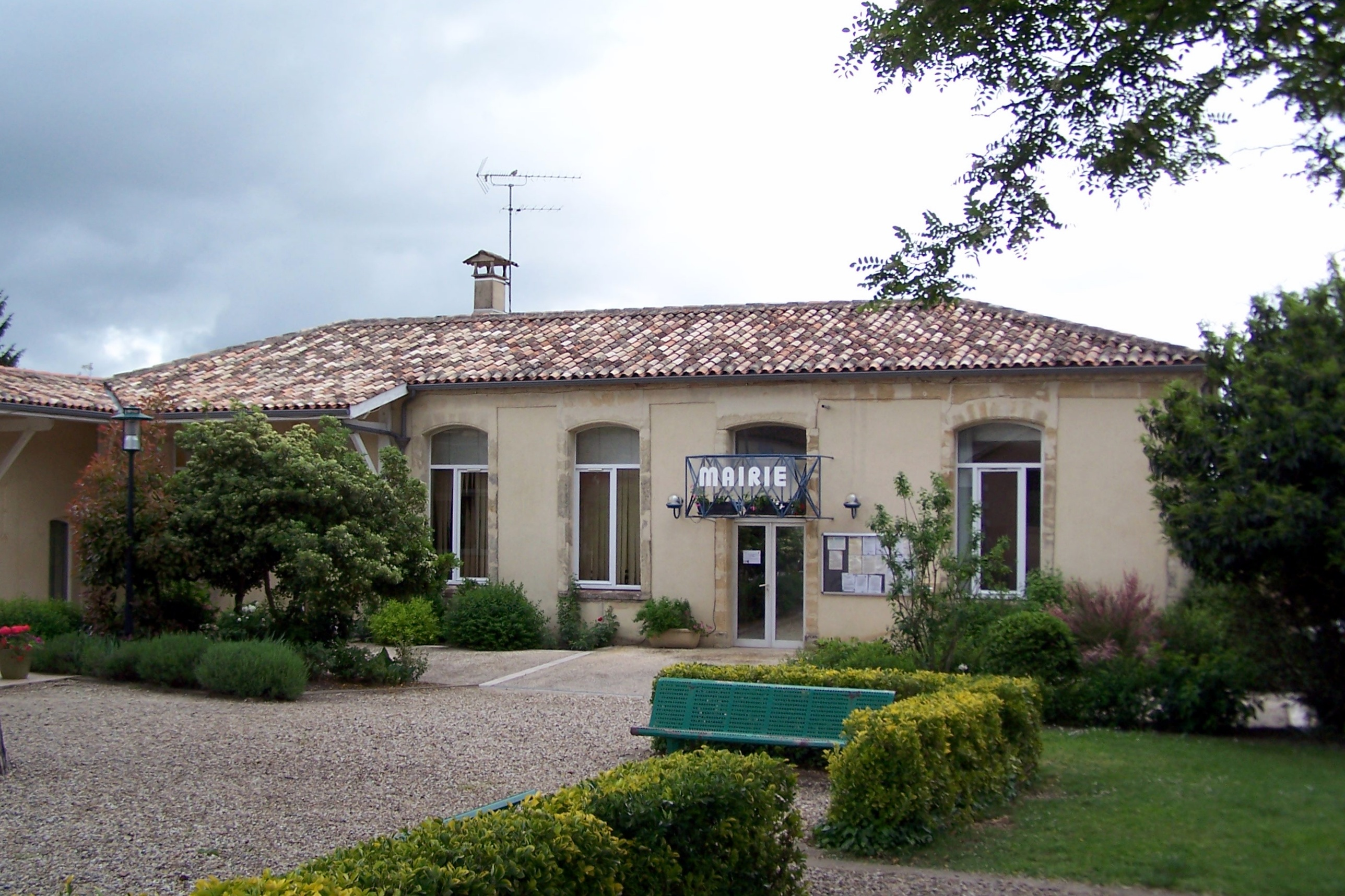
- The town hall in Roaillan
- Location of Roaillan
- Location within France Location within Nouvelle-Aquitaine
- Coordinates: 44°29′59″N 0°16′51″W
- Country: France
- Region: Nouvelle-Aquitaine
- Department: Gironde
- Arrondissement: Langon
- Canton: Le Sud-Gironde

Government
  - Mayor (2020–2026): Jean-François Tauzin
- Area^{1}: 11.48 km^{2} (4.43 sq mi)
- Highest elevation: 106 m (348 ft)
- Lowest elevation: 17 m (56 ft)
- Population (2023): 1,810
  - Density: 158/km^{2} (408/sq mi)
- Time zone: UTC+01:00 (CET)
  - Summer (DST): UTC+02:00 (CEST)
- INSEE/Postal code: 33357 /33210
- ^{1} French Land Register data, which excludes lakes, ponds, glaciers > 1 km^{2} (0.386 sq mi or 247 acres) and river estuaries.

Roaillan (French pronunciation: [ʁɔajɑ̃]; Occitan: Roalhan) is a commune in the Gironde department in Nouvelle-Aquitaine in southwestern France.

== Population ==
Historical population
Year	Pop.	±% p.a.
1968	350	—
1975	328	−0.92%
1982	487	+5.81%
1990	647	+3.61%
1999	840	+2.94%
2007	1,132	+3.80%
2012	1,481	+5.52%
2017	1,700	+2.80%
2023	1,810	+1.05%
Source: INSEE

== See also ==
- Communes of the Gironde department
