= Marions =

- Commune
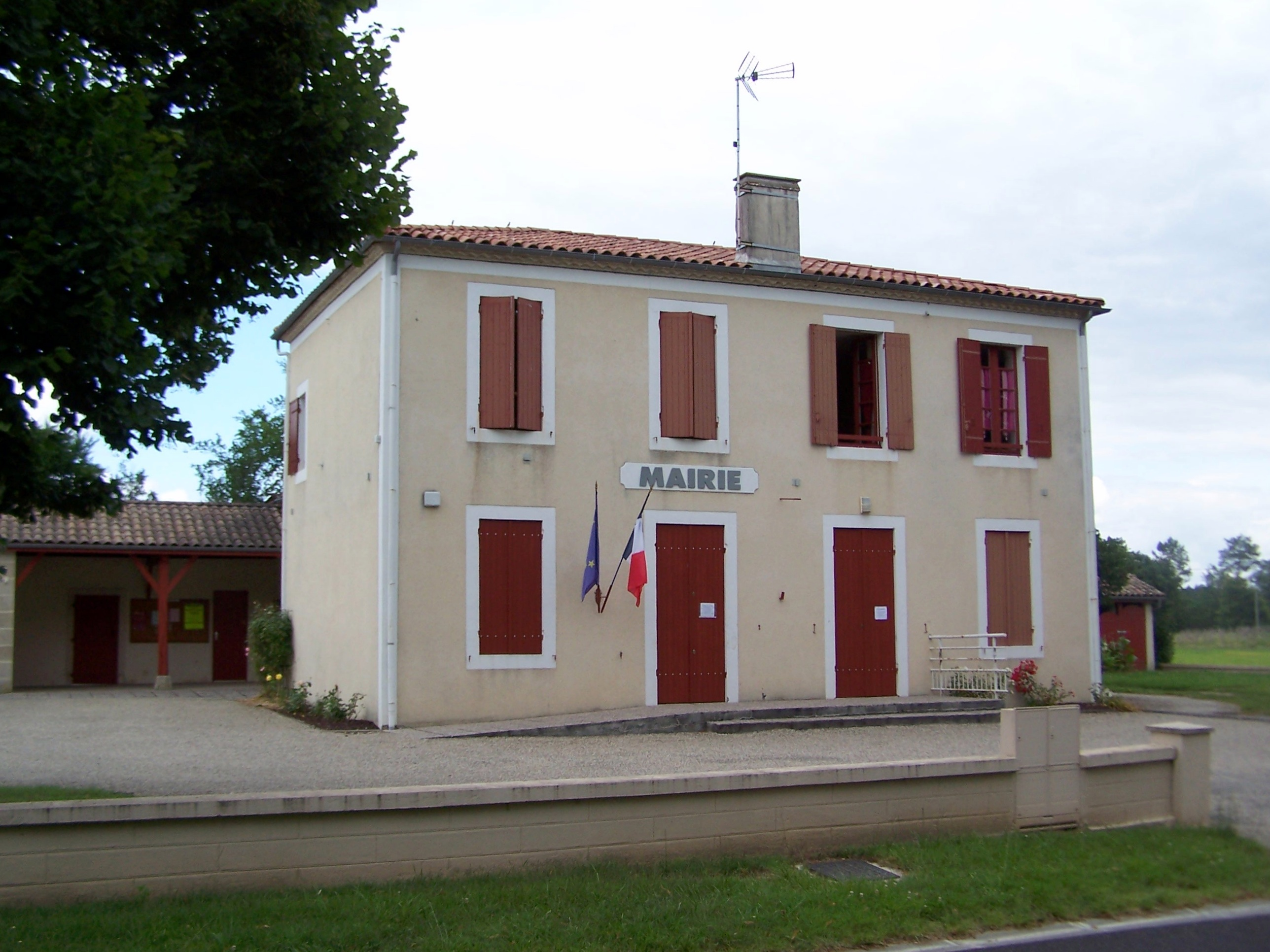
- Town hall
- Location of Marions
- Location within France Location within Nouvelle-Aquitaine
- Coordinates: 44°23′05″N 0°05′21″W
- Country: France
- Region: Nouvelle-Aquitaine
- Department: Gironde
- Arrondissement: Langon
- Canton: Le Sud-Gironde
- Intercommunality: Bazadais

Government
  - Mayor (2020–2026): Adeline Portet
- Area^{1}: 16.32 km^{2} (6.30 sq mi)
- Elevation: 113 m (371 ft)
- Highest elevation: 146 m (479 ft)
- Lowest elevation: 93 m (305 ft)
- Population (2023): 206
  - Density: 12.6/km^{2} (32.7/sq mi)
- Time zone: UTC+01:00 (CET)
  - Summer (DST): UTC+02:00 (CEST)
- INSEE/Postal code: 33271 /33690
- ^{1} French Land Register data, which excludes lakes, ponds, glaciers > 1 km^{2} (0.386 sq mi or 247 acres) and river estuaries.

Marions (Occitan: Maridar) is a commune in the Gironde department in Nouvelle-Aquitaine in southwestern France.

== Population ==
Historical population
Year	Pop.	±% p.a.
1968	193	—
1975	189	−0.30%
1982	193	+0.30%
1990	158	−2.47%
1999	171	+0.88%
2007	190	+1.33%
2012	181	−0.97%
2017	208	+2.82%
2023	206	−0.16%
Source: INSEE

== See also ==
- Communes of the Gironde department
