= Léogeats =

- Commune
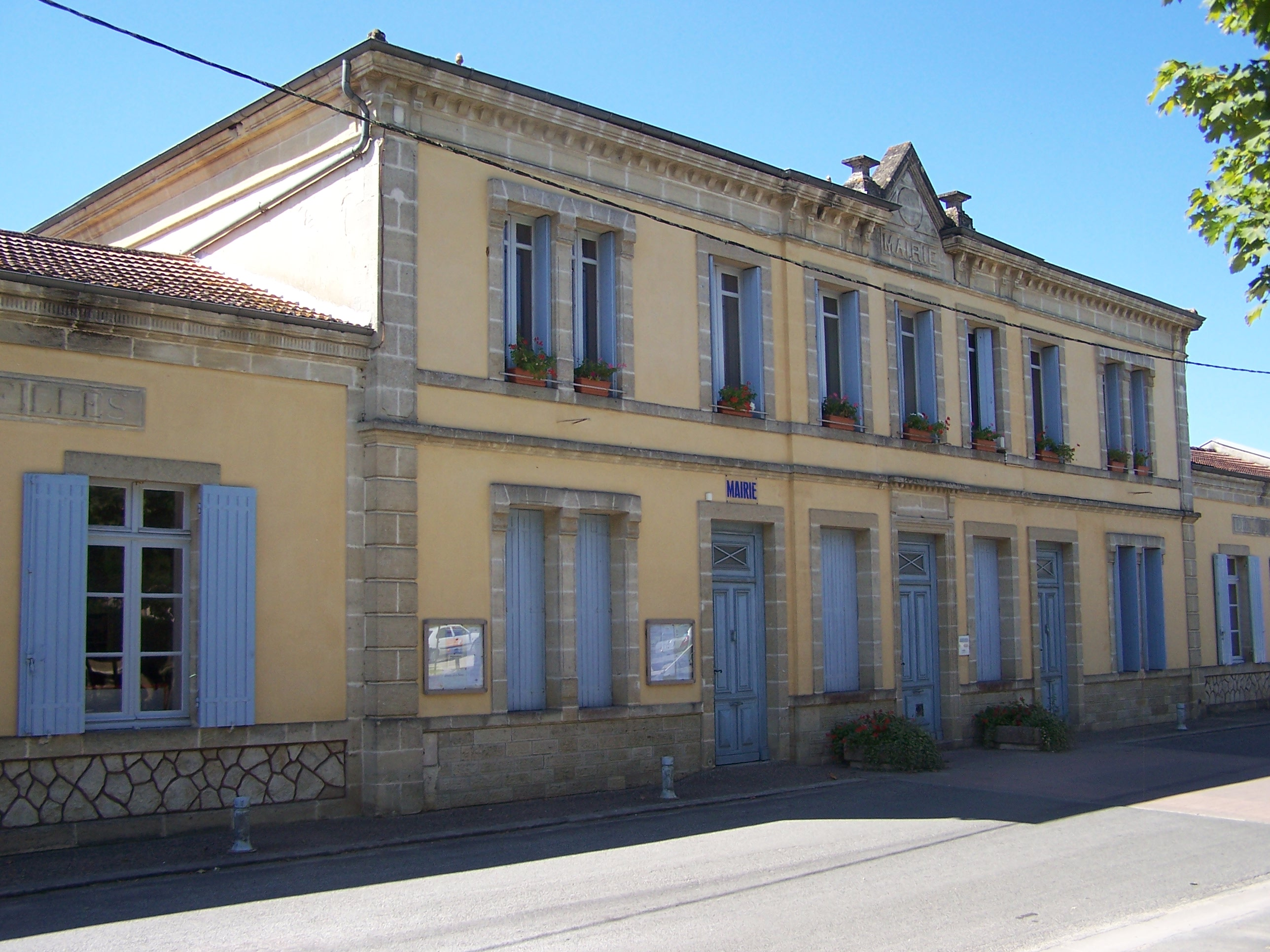
- Town hall

- Coat of arms
- Location of Léogeats
- Location within France Location within Nouvelle-Aquitaine
- Coordinates: 44°30′46″N 0°21′56″W
- Country: France
- Region: Nouvelle-Aquitaine
- Department: Gironde
- Arrondissement: Langon
- Canton: Le Sud-Gironde

Government
  - Mayor (2020–2026): Cédric Pujol
- Area^{1}: 19.61 km^{2} (7.57 sq mi)
- Elevation: 50 m (160 ft)
- Highest elevation: 102 m (335 ft)
- Lowest elevation: 15 m (49 ft)
- Population (2023): 902
  - Density: 46.0/km^{2} (119/sq mi)
- Time zone: UTC+01:00 (CET)
  - Summer (DST): UTC+02:00 (CEST)
- INSEE/Postal code: 33237 /33210
- ^{1} French Land Register data, which excludes lakes, ponds, glaciers > 1 km^{2} (0.386 sq mi or 247 acres) and river estuaries.

Léogeats (French pronunciation: [leɔʒats]; Gascon: Leujats) is a commune in the Gironde department in Nouvelle-Aquitaine in southwestern France.

== Population ==
Historical population
Year	Pop.	±% p.a.
1968	390	—
1975	358	−1.22%
1982	401	+1.63%
1990	454	+1.56%
1999	547	+2.09%
2007	667	+2.51%
2012	759	+2.62%
2017	805	+1.18%
2023	902	+1.91%
Source: INSEE

== Notable people ==
- Joël Dumé, international rugby referee
- Guillaume-Léonce Duprat, a French philosopher and professor of sociology and social economics at the University of Geneva

== See also ==
- Communes of the Gironde department
