= Cours-les-Bains =

- Commune
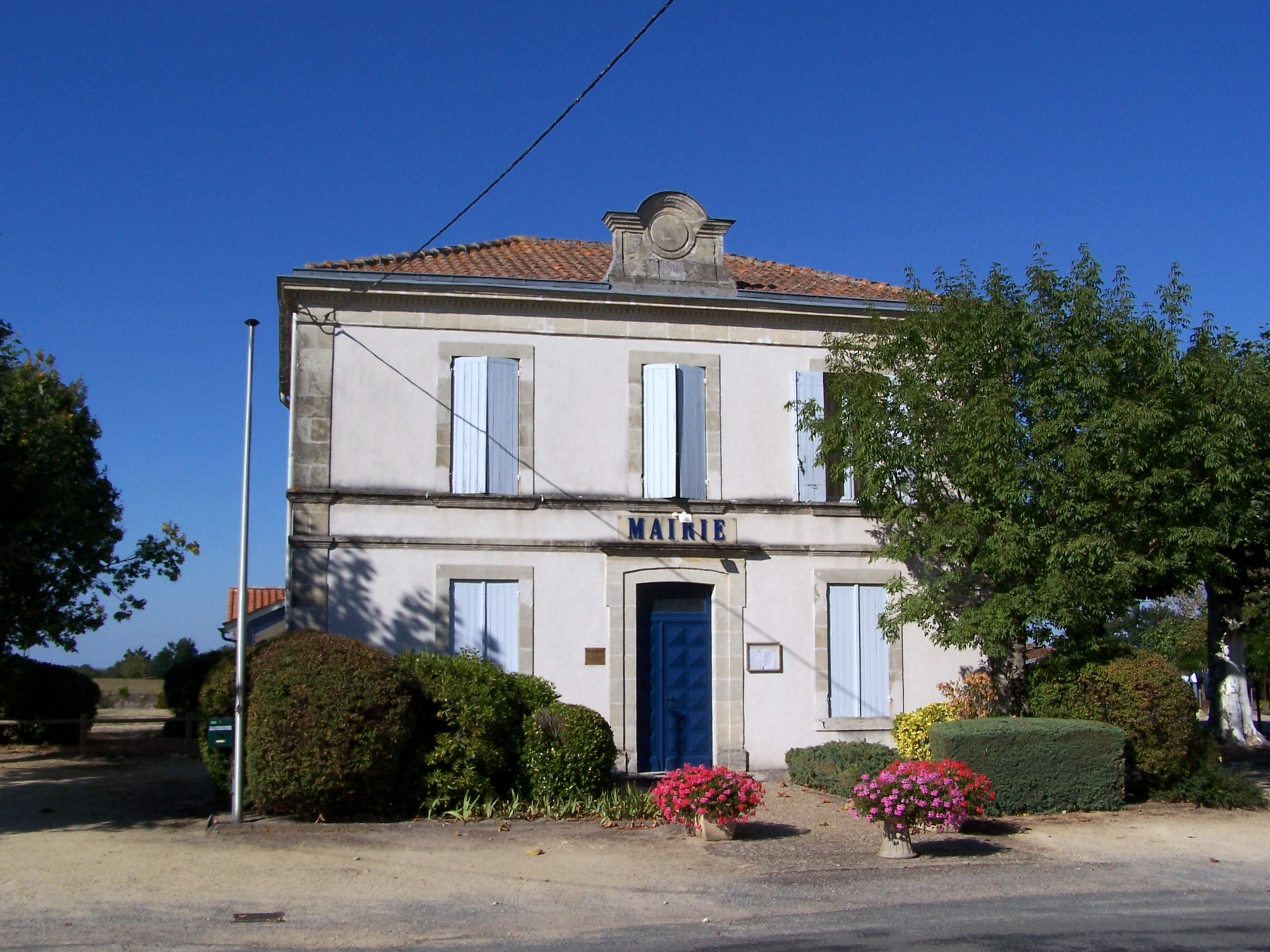
- Town hall
- Location of Cours-les-Bains
- Location within France Location within Nouvelle-Aquitaine
- Coordinates: 44°22′53″N 0°01′03″W
- Country: France
- Region: Nouvelle-Aquitaine
- Department: Gironde
- Arrondissement: Langon
- Canton: Le Sud-Gironde
- Intercommunality: Bazadais

Government
  - Mayor (2023–2026): Valérie Ducasse-Labardin
- Area^{1}: 10.43 km^{2} (4.03 sq mi)
- Elevation: 148 m (486 ft)
- Highest elevation: 167 m (548 ft)
- Lowest elevation: 85 m (279 ft)
- Population (2023): 227
  - Density: 21.8/km^{2} (56.4/sq mi)
- Time zone: UTC+01:00 (CET)
  - Summer (DST): UTC+02:00 (CEST)
- INSEE/Postal code: 33137 /33690
- ^{1} French Land Register data, which excludes lakes, ponds, glaciers > 1 km^{2} (0.386 sq mi or 247 acres) and river estuaries.

Cours-les-Bains (Occitan: Curs lo Bain) is a commune in the Gironde department in Nouvelle-Aquitaine in southwestern France.

== Population ==
Historical population
Year	Pop.	±% p.a.
1968	223	—
1975	201	−1.47%
1982	175	−1.96%
1990	138	−2.93%
1999	157	+1.44%
2007	205	+3.39%
2012	213	+0.77%
2017	222	+0.83%
2023	227	+0.37%
Source: INSEE

== See also ==
- Communes of the Gironde department
