= Bieujac =

- Commune
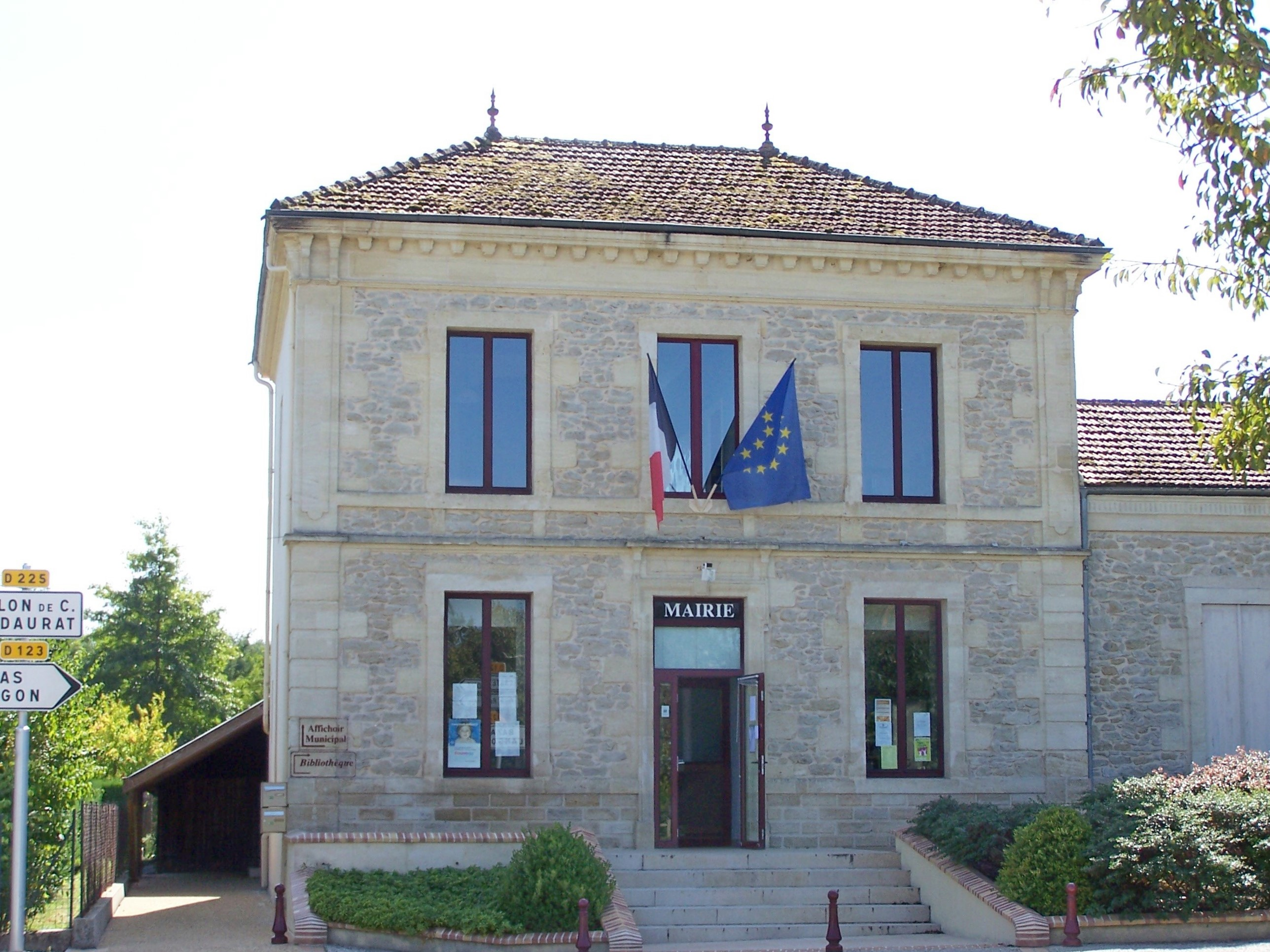
- Town hall
- Location of Bieujac
- Location within France Location within Nouvelle-Aquitaine
- Coordinates: 44°32′25″N 0°09′14″W
- Country: France
- Region: Nouvelle-Aquitaine
- Department: Gironde
- Arrondissement: Langon
- Canton: Le Sud-Gironde
- Intercommunality: Sud Gironde

Government
  - Mayor (2020–2026): Frédéric Birac
- Area^{1}: 6.97 km^{2} (2.69 sq mi)
- Elevation: 26 m (85 ft)
- Highest elevation: 58 m (190 ft)
- Lowest elevation: 13 m (43 ft)
- Population (2023): 654
  - Density: 93.8/km^{2} (243/sq mi)
- Time zone: UTC+01:00 (CET)
  - Summer (DST): UTC+02:00 (CEST)
- INSEE/Postal code: 33050 /33210
- ^{1} French Land Register data, which excludes lakes, ponds, glaciers > 1 km^{2} (0.386 sq mi or 247 acres) and river estuaries.

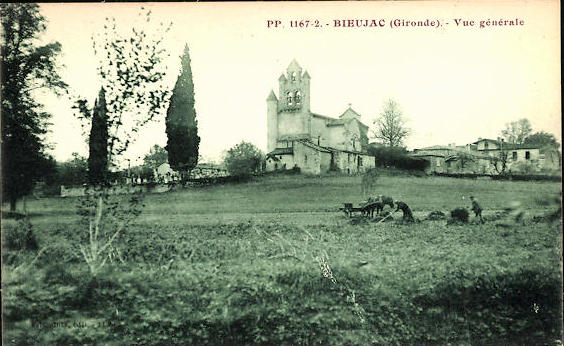

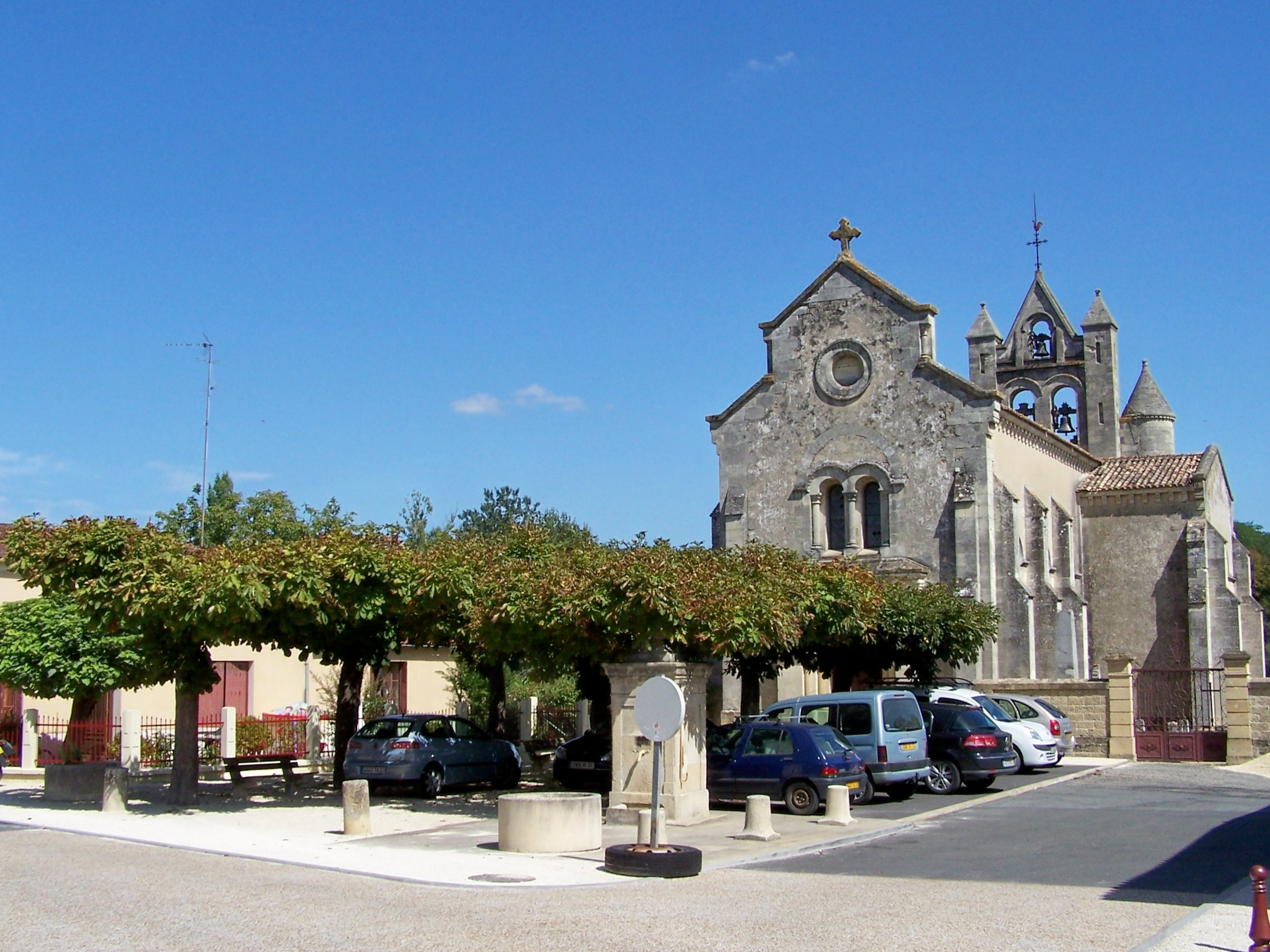

Bieujac (French pronunciation: [bjœʒak]) is a commune in the Gironde department in Nouvelle-Aquitaine in southwestern France.

== Population ==
Historical population
Year	Pop.	±% p.a.
1968	344	—
1975	280	−2.90%
1982	297	+0.85%
1990	384	+3.26%
1999	416	+0.89%
2007	464	+1.37%
2012	508	+1.83%
2017	620	+4.07%
2023	654	+0.89%
Source: INSEE

== See also ==
- Communes of the Gironde department
