= Pompéjac =

- Commune
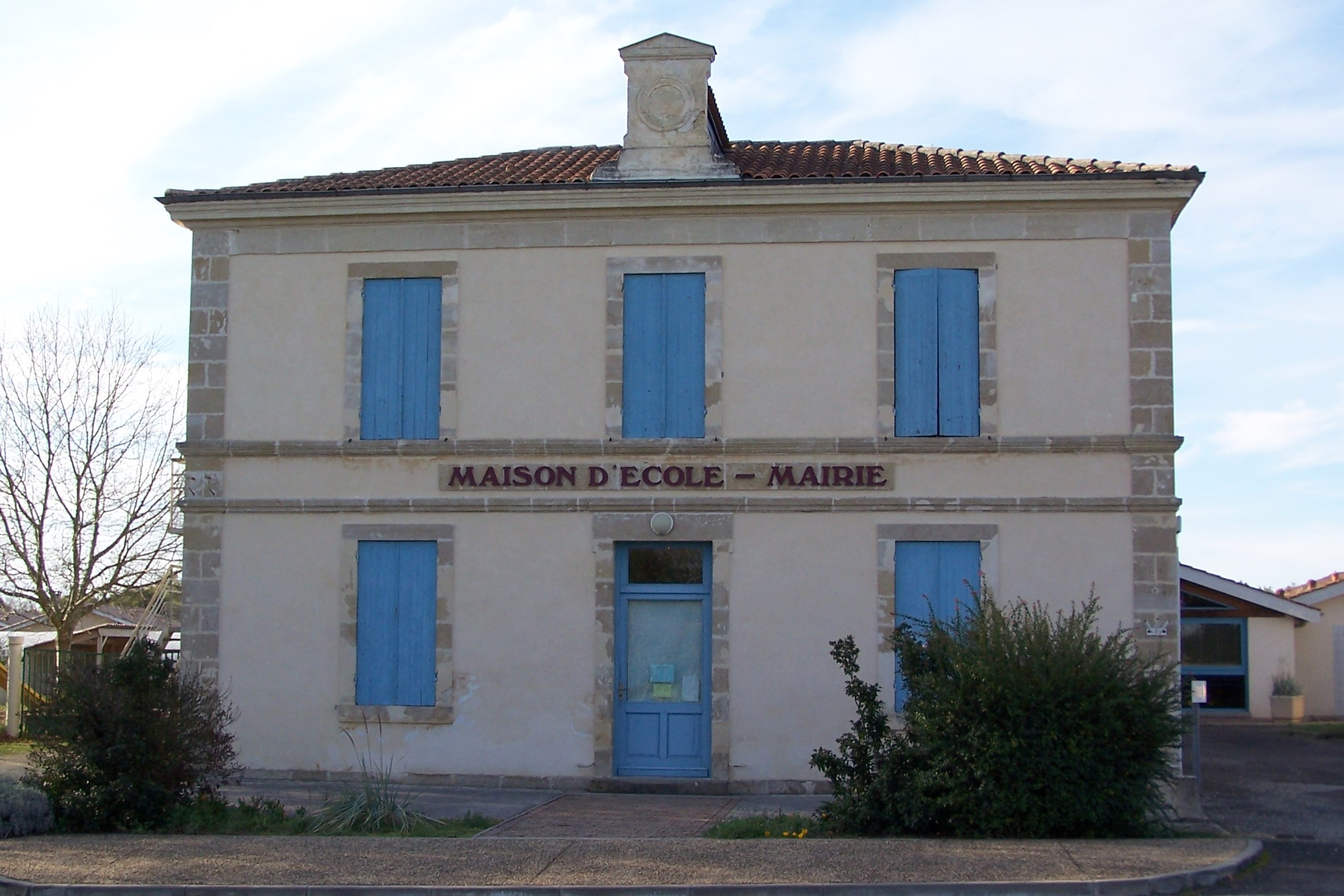
- Town hall
- Location of Pompéjac
- Location within France Location within Nouvelle-Aquitaine
- Coordinates: 44°24′12″N 0°17′23″W
- Country: France
- Region: Nouvelle-Aquitaine
- Department: Gironde
- Arrondissement: Langon
- Canton: Le Sud-Gironde

Government
  - Mayor (2020–2026): Olivier Douence
- Area^{1}: 9.74 km^{2} (3.76 sq mi)
- Elevation: 80 m (260 ft)
- Highest elevation: 105 m (344 ft)
- Lowest elevation: 36 m (118 ft)
- Population (2023): 277
  - Density: 28.4/km^{2} (73.7/sq mi)
- Time zone: UTC+01:00 (CET)
  - Summer (DST): UTC+02:00 (CEST)
- INSEE/Postal code: 33329 /33730
- ^{1} French Land Register data, which excludes lakes, ponds, glaciers > 1 km^{2} (0.386 sq mi or 247 acres) and river estuaries.

Pompéjac (French pronunciation: [pɔ̃peʒak]; Occitan: Pompejac) is a commune in the Gironde department in Nouvelle-Aquitaine in southwestern France.

== Population ==
Historical population
Year	Pop.	±% p.a.
1968	279	—
1975	238	−2.25%
1982	205	−2.11%
1990	206	+0.06%
1999	230	+1.23%
2007	239	+0.48%
2012	238	−0.08%
2017	260	+1.78%
2023	277	+1.06%
Source: INSEE

== See also ==
- Communes of the Gironde department
