= Sauviac, Gironde =

Sauviac
- Commune
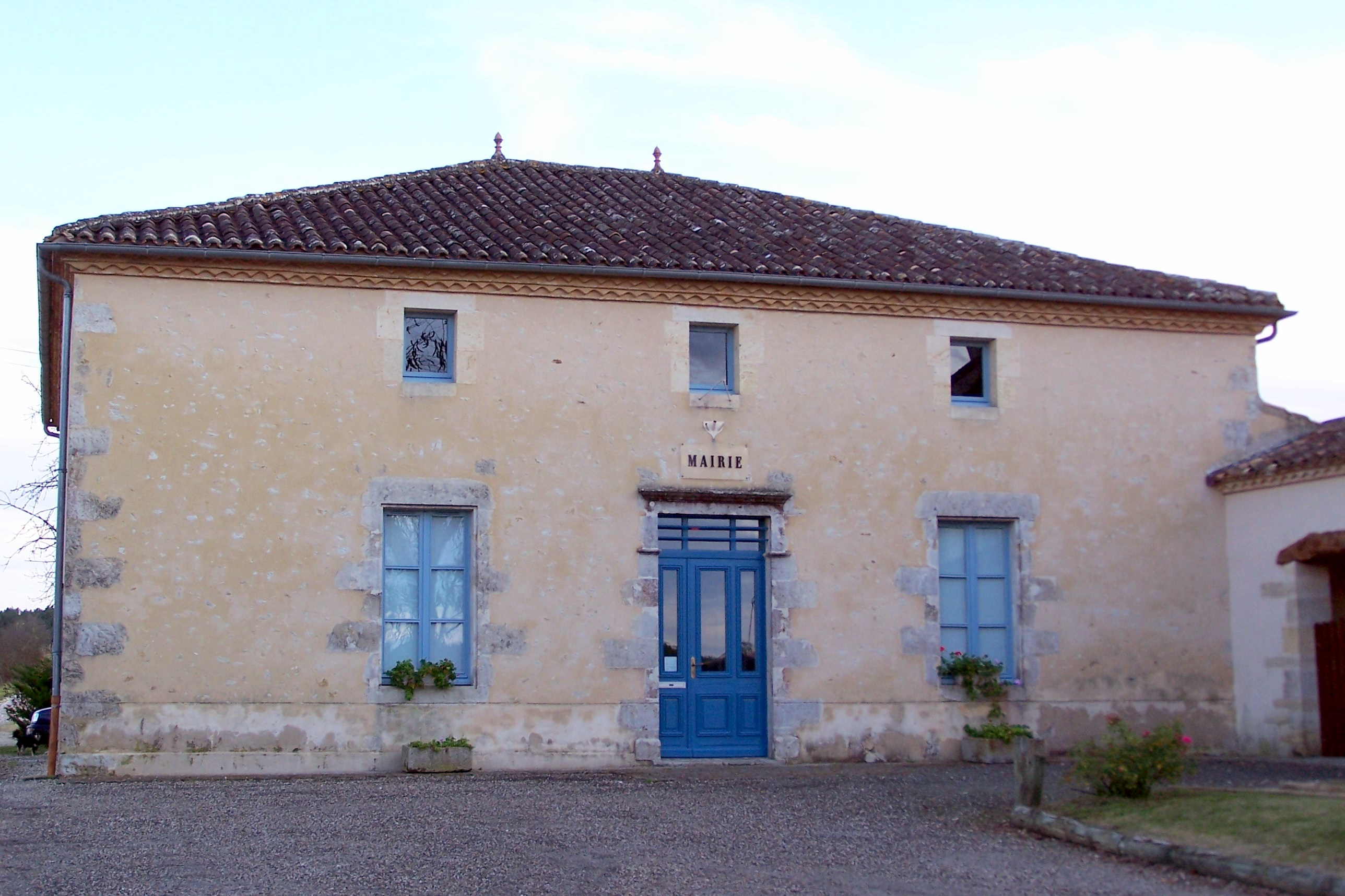
- Town hall
- Location of Sauviac
- Location within France Location within Nouvelle-Aquitaine
- Coordinates: 44°24′23″N 0°11′06″W
- Country: France
- Region: Nouvelle-Aquitaine
- Department: Gironde
- Arrondissement: Langon
- Canton: Le Sud-Gironde
- Intercommunality: Bazadais

Government
  - Mayor (2020–2026): Michel Aimé
- Area^{1}: 11.15 km^{2} (4.31 sq mi)
- Elevation: 80 m (260 ft)
- Highest elevation: 127 m (417 ft)
- Lowest elevation: 55 m (180 ft)
- Population (2023): 333
  - Density: 29.9/km^{2} (77.4/sq mi)
- Time zone: UTC+01:00 (CET)
  - Summer (DST): UTC+02:00 (CEST)
- INSEE/Postal code: 33507 /33430
- ^{1} French Land Register data, which excludes lakes, ponds, glaciers > 1 km^{2} (0.386 sq mi or 247 acres) and river estuaries.

Sauviac (French pronunciation: [sovjak]) is a commune in the Gironde department in Nouvelle-Aquitaine in southwestern France.

== Population ==
Historical population
| Year | Pop. | ±% p.a. |
|---|---|---|
| 1968 | 260 | — |
| 1975 | 242 | −1.02% |
| 1982 | 241 | −0.06% |
| 1990 | 264 | +1.15% |
| 1999 | 246 | −0.78% |
| 2007 | 323 | +3.46% |
| 2012 | 320 | −0.19% |
| 2017 | 327 | +0.43% |
| 2023 | 333 | +0.30% |
Source: INSEE

== See also ==
- Communes of the Gironde department
