= Aubiac, Gironde =

Aubiac
- Commune
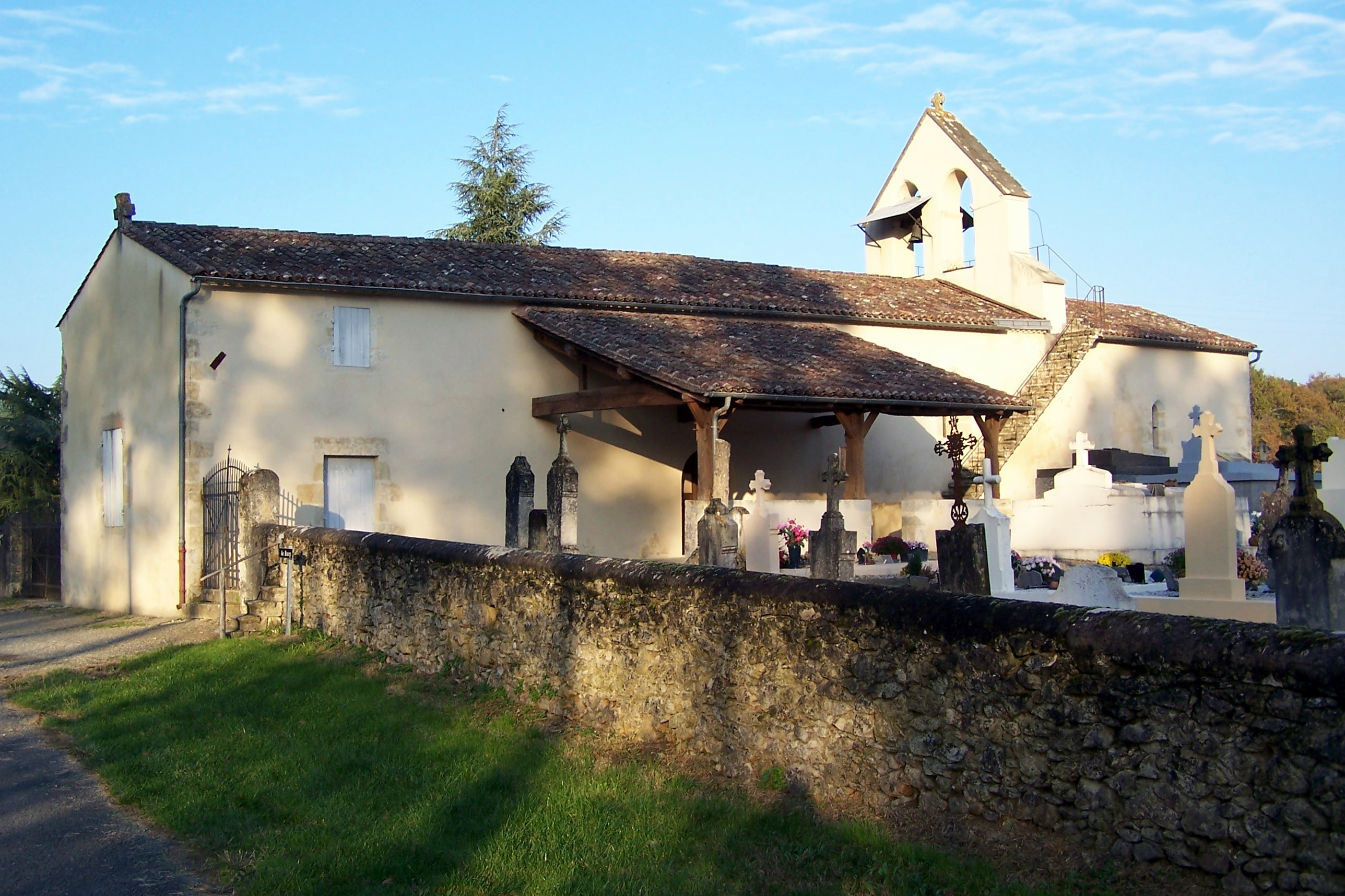
- The church in Aubiac
- Location of Aubiac
- Location within France Location within Nouvelle-Aquitaine
- Coordinates: 44°28′14″N 0°14′24″W
- Country: France
- Region: Nouvelle-Aquitaine
- Department: Gironde
- Arrondissement: Langon
- Canton: Le Sud-Gironde
- Intercommunality: CC Bazadais

Government
  - Mayor (2020–2026): Valérie Belis
- Area^{1}: 5.62 km^{2} (2.17 sq mi)
- Elevation: 118 m (387 ft)
- Highest elevation: 123 m (404 ft)
- Lowest elevation: 46 m (151 ft)
- Population (2023): 317
  - Density: 56.4/km^{2} (146/sq mi)
- Time zone: UTC+01:00 (CET)
  - Summer (DST): UTC+02:00 (CEST)
- INSEE/Postal code: 33017 /33430
- ^{1} French Land Register data, which excludes lakes, ponds, glaciers > 1 km^{2} (0.386 sq mi or 247 acres) and river estuaries.

Aubiac (French pronunciation: [objak]) is a commune in the Gironde department in southwestern France.

== Population ==
Historical population
Year	Pop.	±% p.a.
1968	109	—
1975	125	+1.98%
1982	166	+4.14%
1990	206	+2.74%
1999	259	+2.58%
2007	246	−0.64%
2012	259	+1.04%
2017	272	+0.98%
2023	317	+2.58%
Source: INSEE

== See also ==
- Communes of the Gironde department
