= Birac, Gironde =

Birac
- Commune
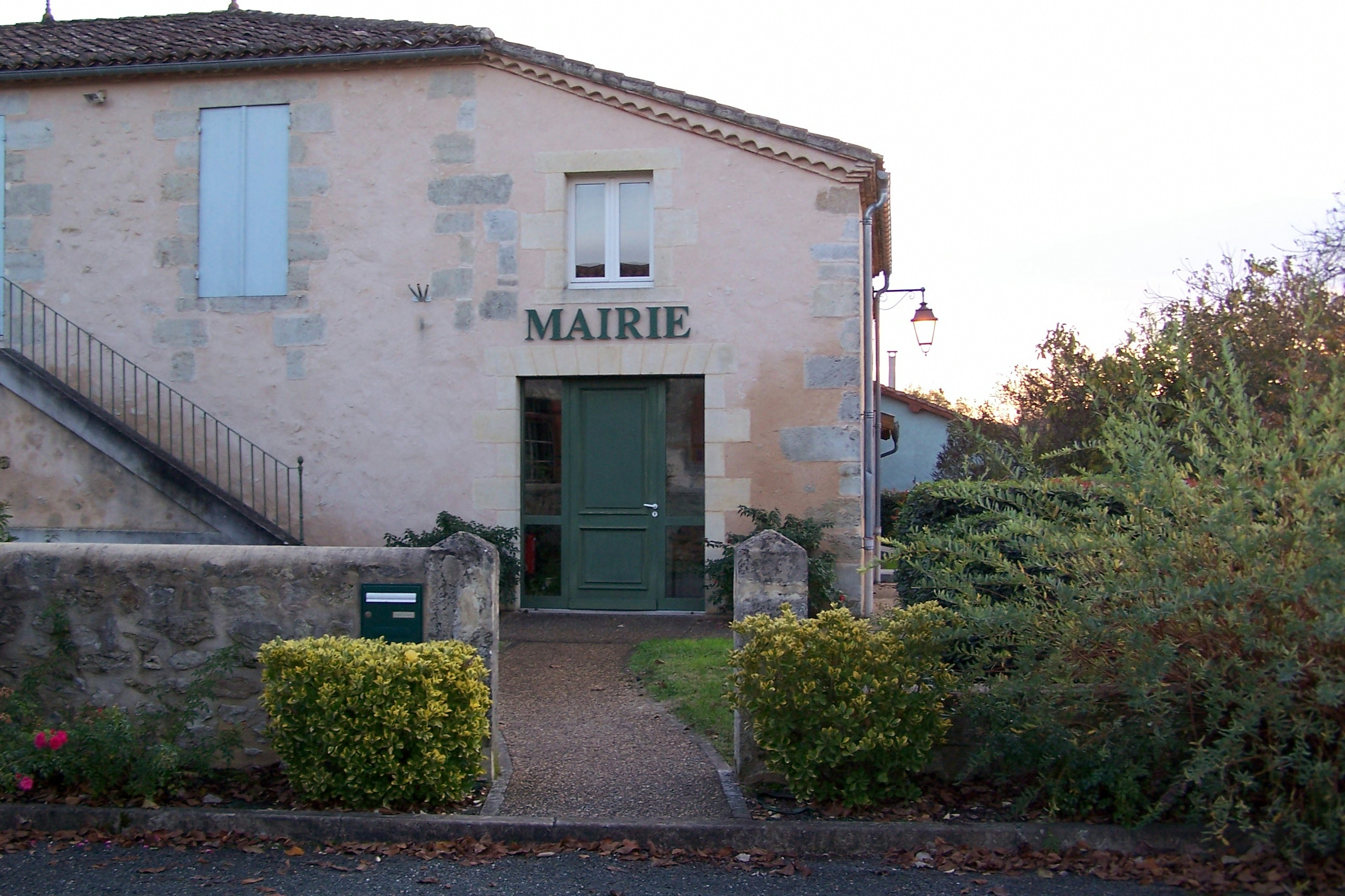
- Town hall

- Coat of arms
- Location of Birac
- Location within France Location within Nouvelle-Aquitaine
- Coordinates: 44°25′07″N 0°08′10″W
- Country: France
- Region: Nouvelle-Aquitaine
- Department: Gironde
- Arrondissement: Langon
- Canton: Le Sud-Gironde
- Intercommunality: Bazadais

Government
  - Mayor (2020–2026): Jean-Pierre Manseau
- Area^{1}: 10.17 km^{2} (3.93 sq mi)
- Elevation: 130 m (430 ft)
- Highest elevation: 135 m (443 ft)
- Lowest elevation: 48 m (157 ft)
- Population (2023): 240
  - Density: 24/km^{2} (61/sq mi)
- Time zone: UTC+01:00 (CET)
  - Summer (DST): UTC+02:00 (CEST)
- INSEE/Postal code: 33053 /33430
- ^{1} French Land Register data, which excludes lakes, ponds, glaciers > 1 km^{2} (0.386 sq mi or 247 acres) and river estuaries.

Birac (French pronunciation: [biʁak]) is a commune in the Gironde department in Nouvelle-Aquitaine in southwestern France.

== Population ==
Historical population
Year	Pop.	±% p.a.
1968	233	—
1975	188	−3.02%
1982	200	+0.89%
1990	180	−1.31%
1999	182	+0.12%
2007	223	+2.57%
2012	225	+0.18%
2017	231	+0.53%
2023	240	+0.64%
Source: INSEE

== See also ==
- Communes of the Gironde department
