= Pury =

Pury or de Pury is a surname. Notable people with the surname include:

== de Pury family ==
Members of the de Pury family, which was part of the Prussian nobility and Swiss nobility, include:

- Albert de Pury (born 1940), Swiss biblical scholar
- David de Pury (1709–1786), banker, merchant, and philanthropist from the Principality of Neuchâtel
- David de Pury (diplomat) (1943-2000), Swiss diplomat and businessman
- Edmond Jean de Pury (1845–1911), Swiss painter
- Frédéric Guillaume de Pury (1831–1890), Swiss-Australian wine maker, farmer, and diplomat
- James-Ferdinand de Pury (1823–1902), Swiss businessman and philanthropists
- Jean-Pierre Pury (1675–1736), Explorer, geographer, and American colonist from the Principality of Neuchâtel
- Marianne de Pury (born 1935), Swiss theatre director
- Roland de Pury (1907–1979), Swiss theologian
- Simon de Pury (born 1951), Swiss auctioneer, art dealer, and collector

== Other people with the surname Pury ==
- William Pury (1489–1537), English Member of Parliament
