= De Pury family =

Swiss noble family

Pury
- Patrician family
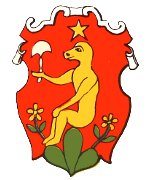
- Country: Switzerland
- Origin: Val-de-Ruz, Neuchâtel, Switzerland
- Founded: before 1396 (630 years ago)
- Titles: Baron de Pury

The de Pury (respectively Pury) is a Swiss noble family from Neuchâtel. The family, part of the Neuchâtel patriciate, were ennobled by Henri II d'Orléans, Duke of Longueville in 1651. In 1785 they were elevated to the Prussian nobility by Frederick the Great.

== History ==
The de Pury family is originated in Val-de-Ruz in the County of Neuchâtel. Records of the family in Neuchâtel go back before 1396. The Pury were elevated into the French nobility in 1651 by Henri II d'Orléans, Duke of Longueville. In 1785, the family was elevated into the Prussian nobility by Frederick the Great. As part of the Neuchâtel patriciate, members of the family have held important positions in government, business and industry.

In the 18th century, an American branch of the family was established by Jean-Pierre Pury, who founded the Colony of Purrysburg. Members of the American branch became planters in the Southeastern United States.

In the 19th century, an Australian branch of the family was founded by Frédéric Guillaume de Pury.

== Notable family members ==
- Jean-Pierre Pury (1675–1736), explorer
- David de Pury (1709–1786), banker, merchant, and philanthropist
- James-Ferdinand de Pury (1823–1902), businessman and philanthropist
- Frédéric Guillaume de Pury (1831–1890), diplomat, winemaker, and farmer
- Edmond Jean de Pury (1845–1911), artist
- Roland de Pury (1907–1979), theologian
- Marianne de Pury (born 1935), theatre artist and composer
- Albert de Pury (born 1940), biblical scholar
- David de Pury (1943–2000), diplomat and businessman
- Simon de Pury (born 1951), art dealer, curator, and auctioneer
