= Kostrowicki =

Kostrowicki is a surname. Notable people with the surname include:

- Jerzy Kostrowicki (1918–2002), Polish geographer
- Wilhelm Kostrowicki, better known as Guillaume Apollinaire (1880–1918), Polish-French poet and writer
