= Zygmunt Estreicher =

Polish ethnomusicologist

Zygmunt Estreicher (Born 3 December 1917 in Freiburg, died 11 September 1993) – was a Polish ethnomusicologist.

== Biography ==
He was a Polish musicologist and ethnomusicologist, specialising in the musical culture of the Inuit and African peoples. He was born in Fribourg, Switzerland, and in 1919 he and his family returned to Kraków, where he completed his musical studies. During the Second World War, he worked for the Polish Radio Kraków, and after getting to the West, he served in the Polish Armed Forces. After the war he remained in Switzerland, where he obtained his doctorate and habilitation, and worked as a librarian and lecturer in Neuchâtel and Geneva. He was a professor at the University of Neuchâtel from 1957 to 1969 and a professor at the University of Geneva from 1969. He conducted field research, including among the Bororo people, analysing the traditional music of indigenous communities.
