= Victor Goldschmidt (disambiguation) =

Victor Moritz Goldschmidt (1888–1947) was a Norwegian chemist and mineralogist considered the founder of geochemistry.

Victor Goldschmidt may also refer to:

- Victor Mordechai Goldschmidt (1853–1933), German mineralogist, natural philosopher and art collector
- Victor Goldschmidt (philosopher) (1914–1981), French philosopher and historian of philosophy
