= Edmond Jean de Pury =

Swiss painter

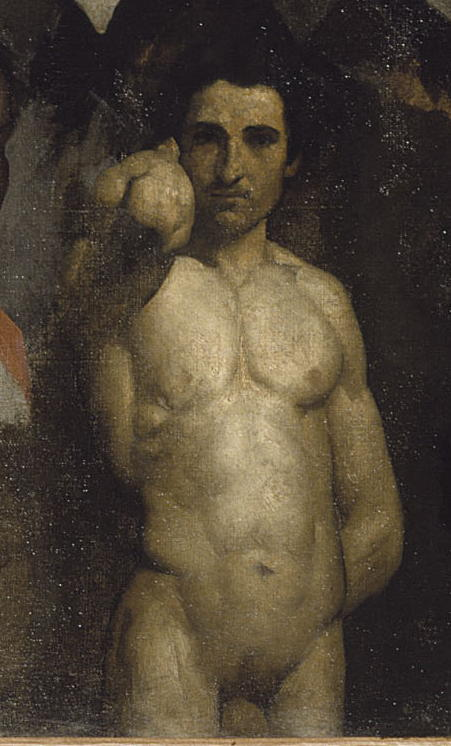
- Portrait of de Pury by Alfred Lenglet
- Born: 6 March 1845; Neuchâtel, Switzerland
- Died: 7 November 1911 (aged 66); Lausanne, Switzerland
- Education: École des Beaux-Arts
- Occupations: painter, engraver
- Spouse: Marie Amélie Mathilde Wagnière
- Children: 2

Baron Edmond Jean de Pury (6 March 1845 – 7 November 1911) was a Swiss painter and engraver.

== Biography ==
De Pury was born on 6 March 1845 in Neuchâtel. He was a member of the de Pury family, a Prussian noble family of Swiss origin, and was a nephew of James-Ferdinand de Pury.

He trained at the École des Beaux-Arts in Paris, studying painting and engraving. While at school in Paris, he was a student of Charles Gleyre

In a composite group portrait of students in Gleyre's atelier, de Pury was painted in the nude by fellow student Alfred Lenglet. Another student, Paul Milliet, wrote of the image in his memoirs: "The fragment…shows the athletic torso of…de Pury. Alfred Lenglet's painting is solid and luminous, but to render completely the elegant vigor of the model would have required the chisel of a Greek sculptor."

Although he painted landscapes, de Pury's main focus was portraiture. He was best known for his Italian figure paintings, mainly of working-class people of Rome, Capri, and Venice. The highest price for one of his paintings was US$40,599 in 2007 for In the Lagoons of Venice. His paintings were exhibited in Paris. His portrait of Richard Wagner was completed two years before the composer's death. His work is displayed in the collections of the Museum of Fine Arts Bern, the Kunstmuseum Basel, the Museum des Beaux-Arts de La Chaux-de-Fonds, the Musée d'Art et d'Histoire de Genève, and the Cantonal Museum of Fine Arts.

In 1889 de Pury was awarded a medal at the Exposition Universelle.

== Personal life ==
He was married to Marie Amélie Mathilde Wagnière (1849–1928), member of a noted Swiss family of diplomats, who herself was also an artist.

== Death ==
De Pury died on 7 November 1911 in Lausanne.

== Gallery of work ==
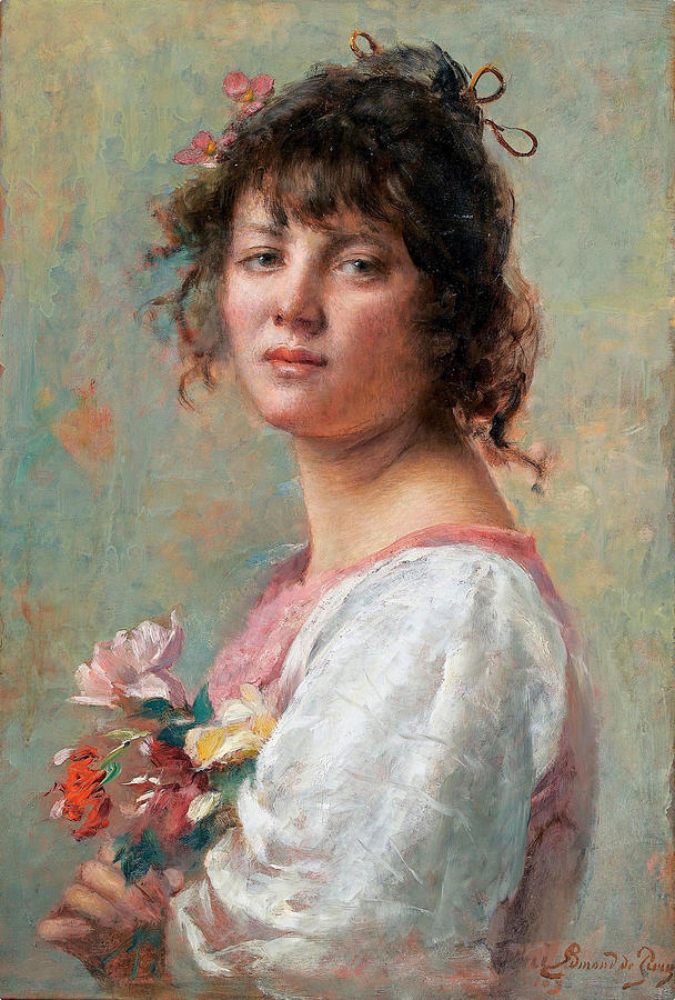
Young Venetian Woman

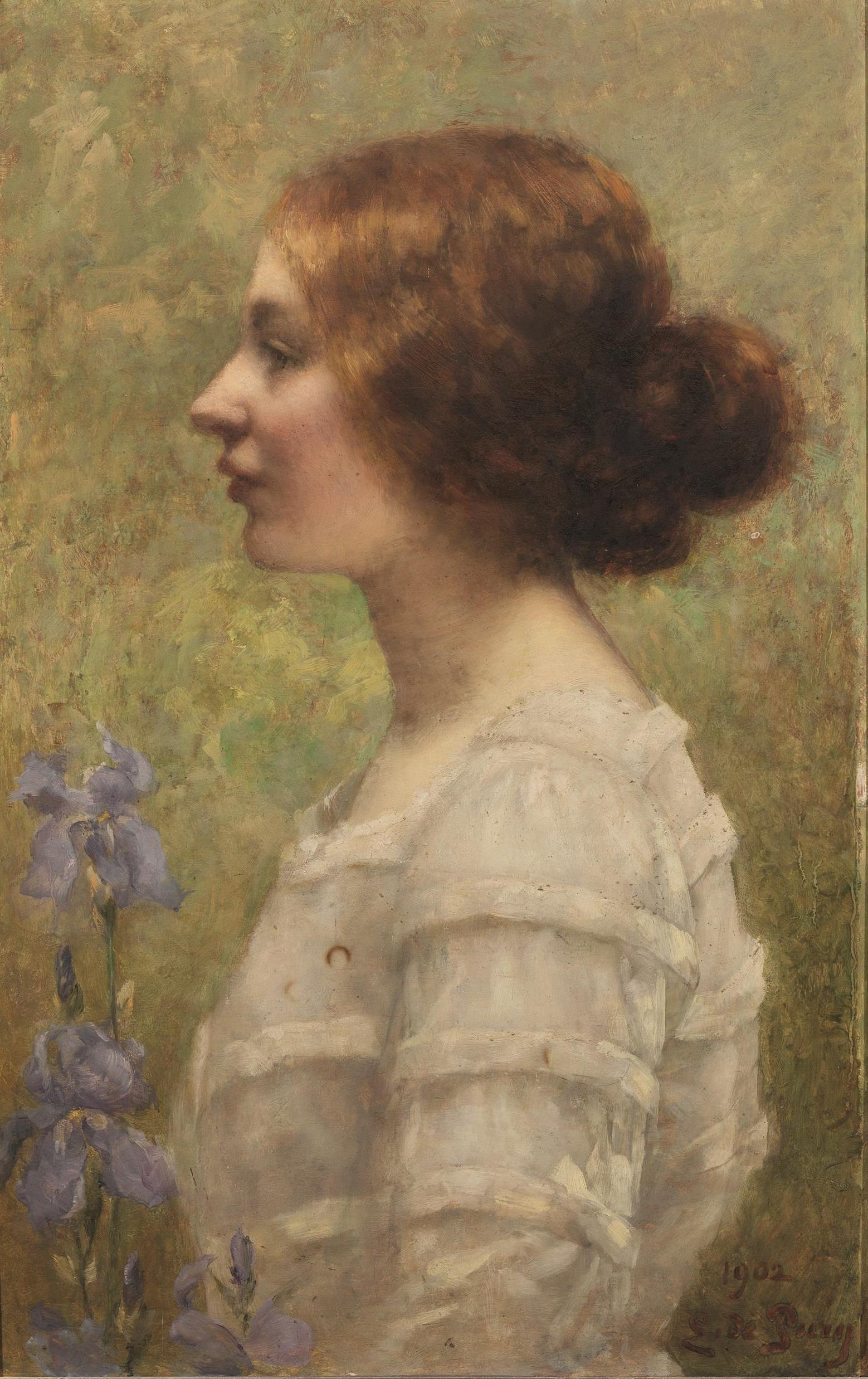
Portrait of Alba Brunelli, Wife of the Painter Riblet, 1902

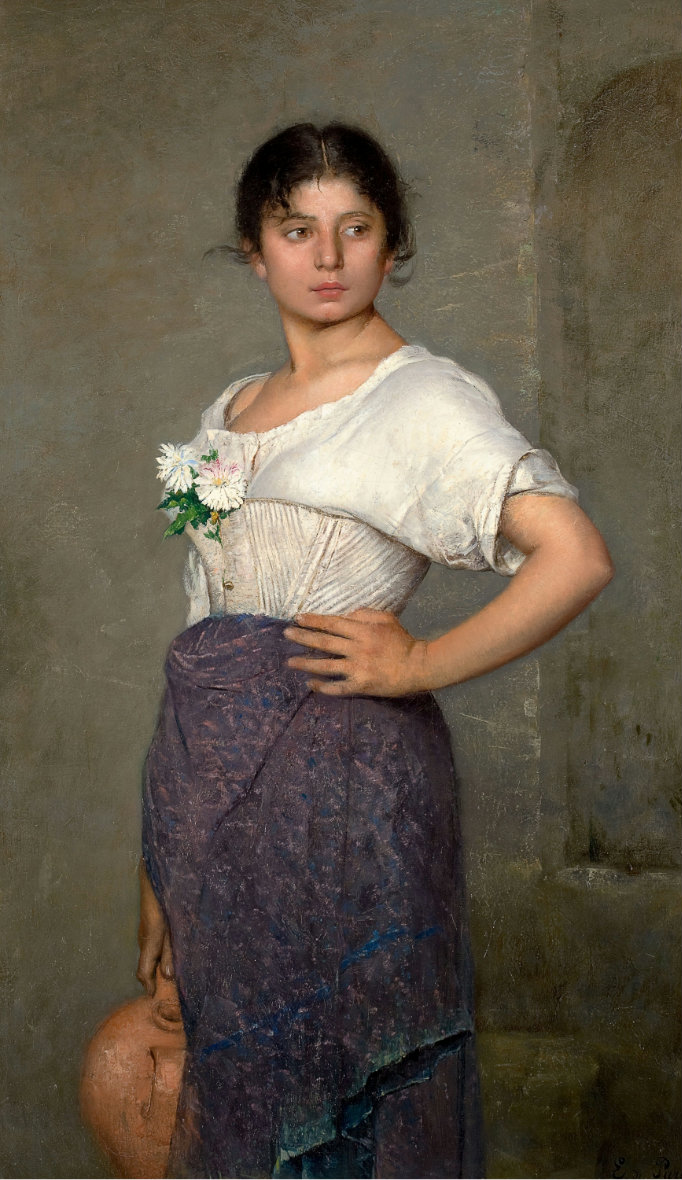
At the Well

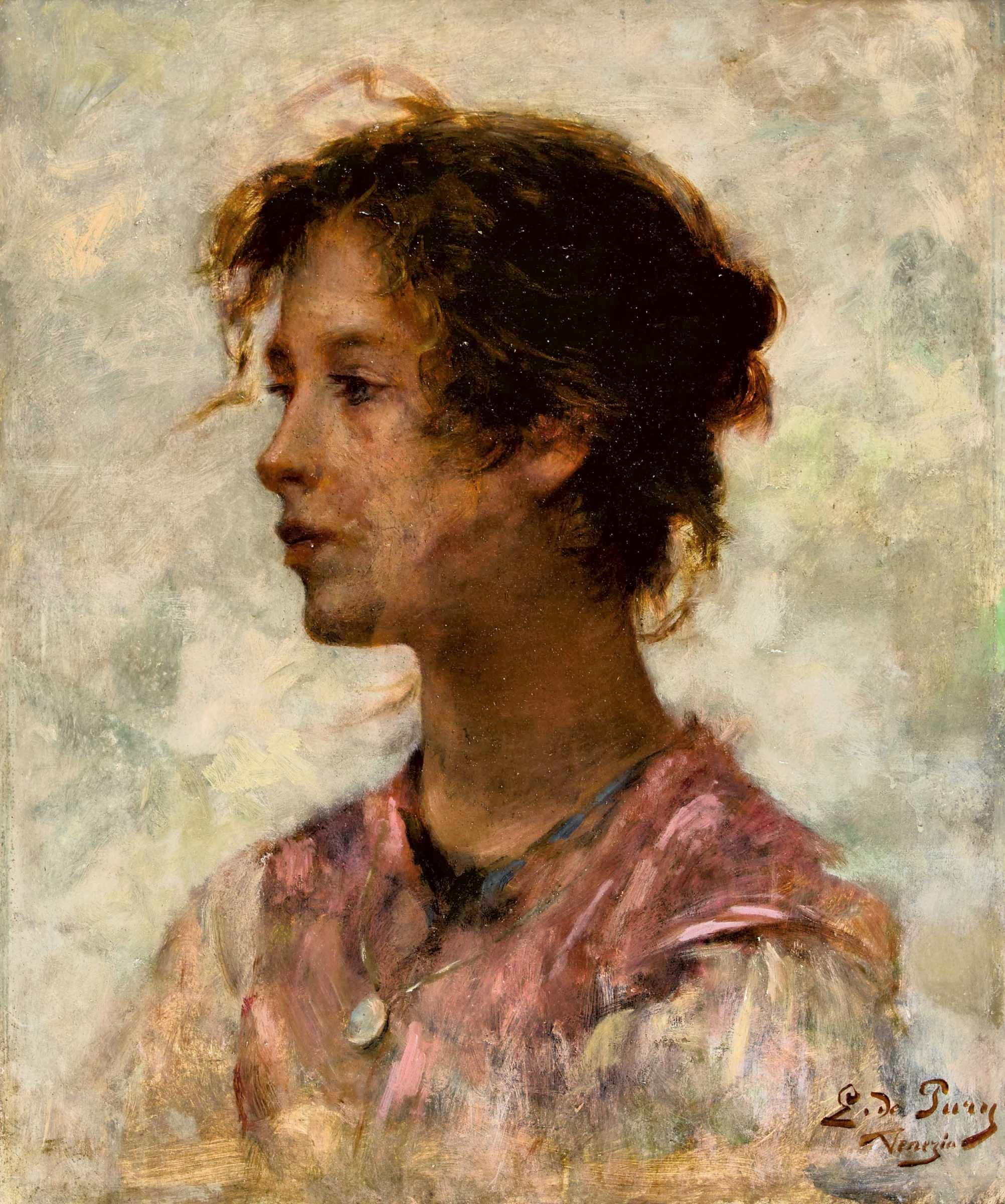
Portrait of a Young Girl

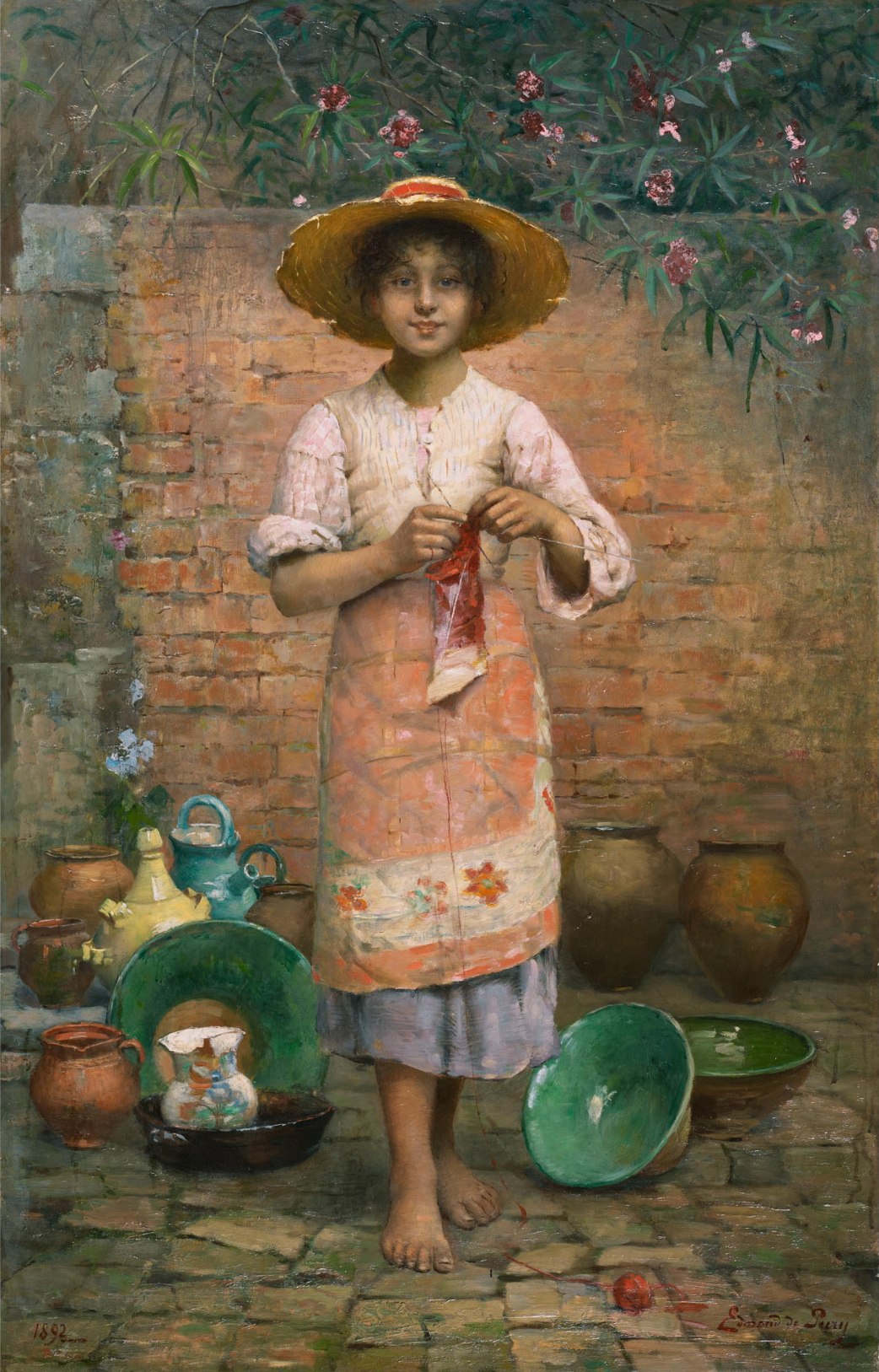
Hélène, the Little Shopkeeper

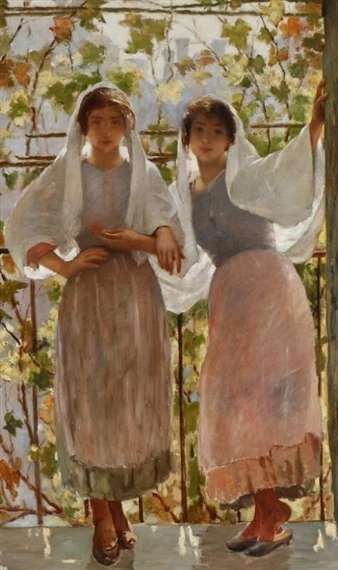
Sisterly Affection

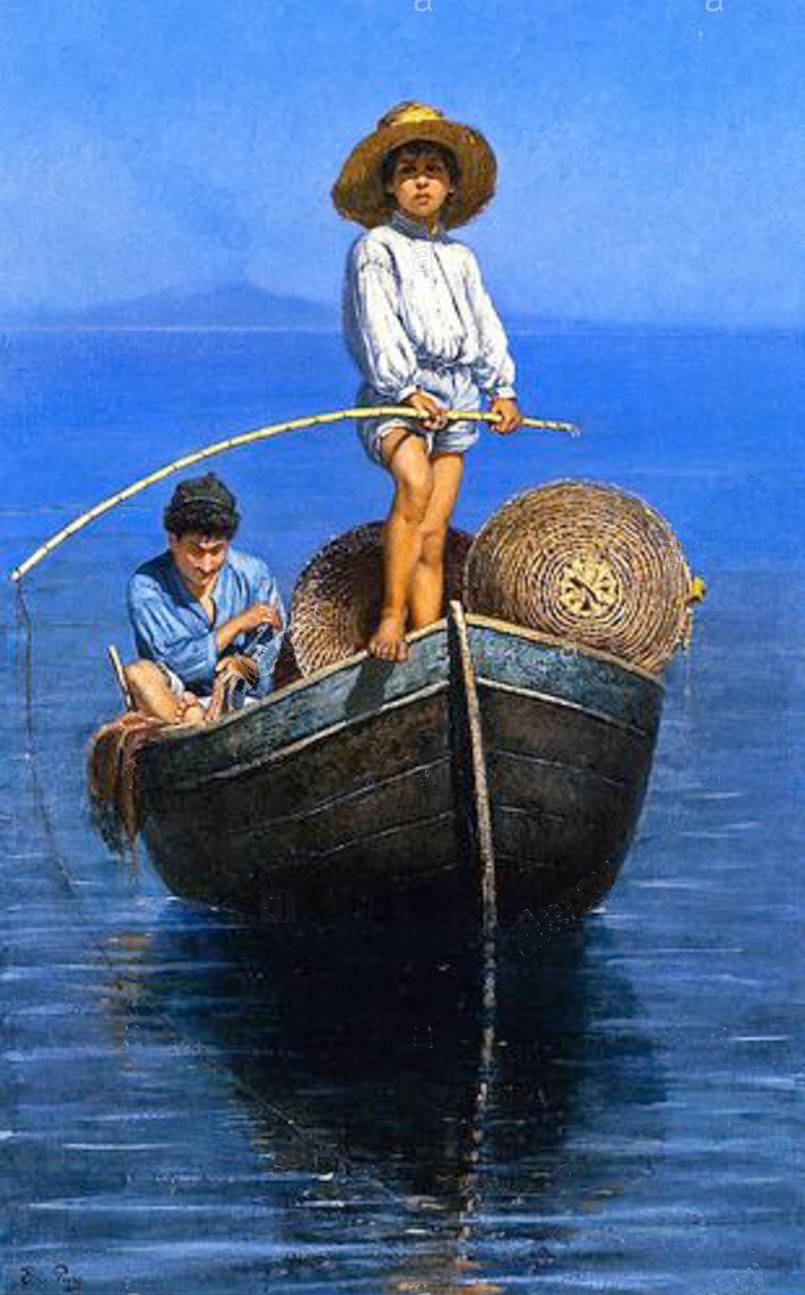
A Young Italian Fisher (Gulf of Naples)

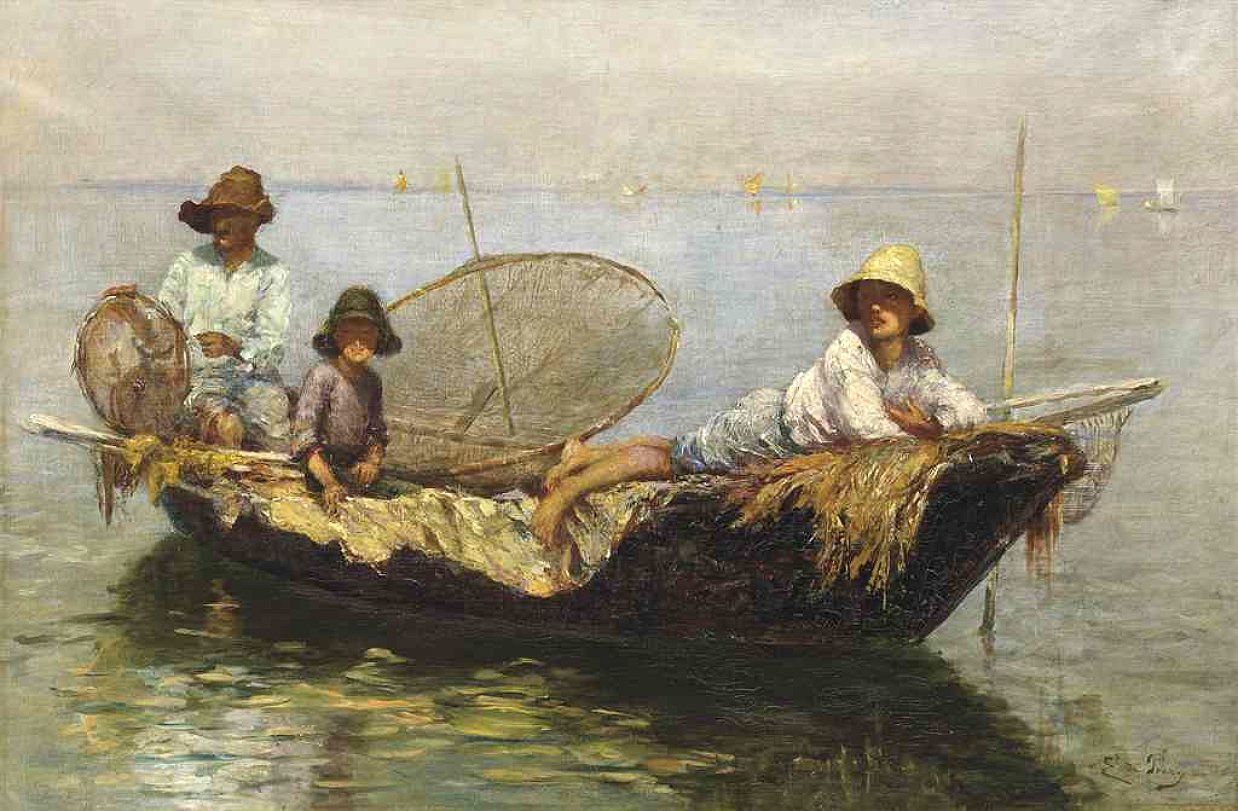
Fishermen on the Lake

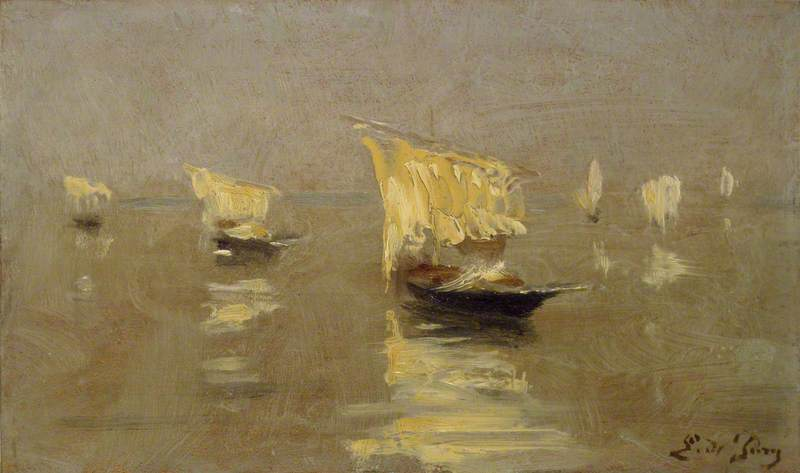
Boats in the Canals of Venice
