= University of Neuchâtel =

Public research university in Neuchâtel, Switzerland

- Université de Neuchâtel
- Type: Public
- Established: 1838; 188 years ago
- Affiliations: BENEFRI, Triangle Azur, CRUS, CUSO, and AUF
- Budget: CHF 140.97 million
- Rector: Deniz Gyger Gaspoz
- Administrative staff: 1103
- Students: 4,508
- Doctoral students: 619
- Location: Avenue du 1er-Mars 26, CH - 2000, Neuchâtel, Neuchâtel, Canton of Neuchâtel, Switzerland; 46.99373°N 6.938547°E
- Website: unine.ch

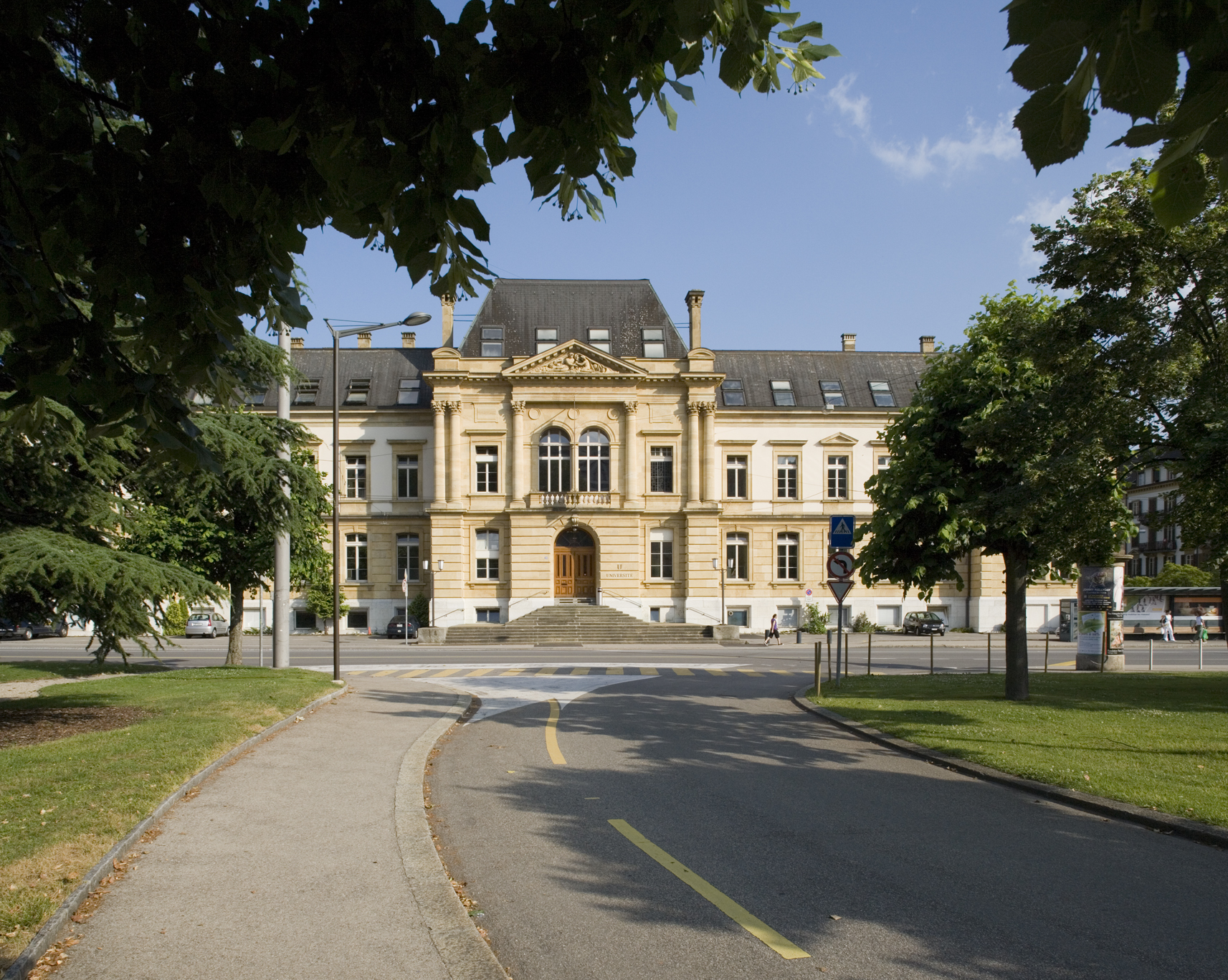
Main building

The University of Neuchâtel (UniNE) is a French-speaking public research university in Neuchâtel, Switzerland. The university has four faculties (schools) and more than a dozen institutes, including arts and human sciences, natural sciences, law and economics. The Faculty of Arts and Human Sciences, with 2,000 students, is the largest school of those that comprise the University of Neuchâtel.

The university has an annual budget of CHF 144 million and an annual research fund of CHF 40 million. Approximately 4,000 students, including 600 PhD students attend the university, and more than 600 diplomas, licences, doctorates and certificates are awarded each year. The university has more than 1,100 employees.

== History ==
The University of Neuchâtel superseded the Academy, which was created in 1838 Prince of Neuchâtel. It awarded licentiate academic degrees in arts and sciences. In 1848, the Grand Council decreed the closing of the academy and in 1866 a new "academy" was established and finally renamed in 1909.

Before 2005, the University of Neuchâtel followed the French education model with some minor differences. The university now follows the academic standards of the Bologna Process which proposes a three-tiered system of university degrees, namely bachelor's degree, master's degree, and doctorate.

== Academic programs ==
University of Neuchatel offers classes in French as well as in English. Programs are classified at undergraduate and graduate level such as bachelor, Master and doctoral degree programs in disciplines like finance, computer science, law, economics, sciences and sports, journalism and mathematics to name a few.

In partnership with two other universities being De Montfort University in Leicester (England) and SDA Bocconi School of Management in Milan (Italy) and organised by the International Centre for Sport Studies (CIES), the University of Neuchatel also offers a FIFA Master in Management, Law and Humanities of Sport.

== Faculties ==
Faculty of Humanities

This is the largest faculty, with around 2000 students. Its fields of research and study are Ancient and Middle Age Languages and Civilizations, Archeology, Art History, English Language and Literature, French Language and Literature, Logic, Museology and Philosophy. In Social Sciences, the Center for the Understanding of Social Processes (Maison d’analyse des processus sociaux, MAPS) is made up of five institutes: Anthropology, Geography, Psychology and Education, Swiss Forum for Migration and Population Studies and Sociology. It fosters cooperative work on interdisciplinary research projects.

Faculty of Science

The Faculty of Science numbers around 900 students. This faculty is active within different research domains, such as: Biology, Biogeosciences, Hydrogeology, Geothermal Science, Information Technology, Mathematics, Chemistry and Physics. It is the leading Swiss house for one of the National Centres of Competence in Research: Plant Survival.

Faculty of Law

This faculty has 560 students and offers six orientations within the Master: Business Law, International and European Law, Public Law, Health and Biotechnology Law, Sports Law, Judiciary Professions. It has a 3rd cycle International master's degree with the SDA Bocconi University of Milan and the de Montfort University of Leicester, in collaboration with FIFA and counts many institutes, such as the Institute of Health Law (IDS) or the International Sport Science Center (CIES).

Faculty of Economics

The Faculty of Economics has around 700 students. It offers a master's degree programs in many different fields: Financial Analysis, International Business Development, Public Economics, Public Politics and Management, Psychology of Labor and Organizations, Statistics, and Information Systems. Unique within Switzerland is the Academy of Journalism and Media: an integrated master's program, designed with professionals from the sector, focusing on the new needs of enterprise in the media world. The Bachelor in economics was evaluated as the best bachelor in Switzerland in front of the HSG.

Faculty of Theology (until 2015)

A small, historic building, the seat of the prestigious Bibliothèque des Pasteurs, houses the Faculty of Theology. Neuchâtel offered a common master's degree in theology, with the universities of Geneva and Lausanne. In 2015, the Faculty of Theology was closed; now the teaching and research in theology takes place at the University of Geneva and the University of Lausanne.

== NSF Research Commission ==
The Research Committee is an organ of the Swiss National Science Foundation (SNSF) composed of members of the university. It acts as an organ of SNSF, firstly by providing research grants for junior researchers and, second, by serving as counsel for grants for advanced research. On behalf of the rector, it sets the institutional notice required by the SNSF for applications filed with its divisions. It also claims expertise in scholarship and grant under the Fund of the university of donations and offers.

== Institut de langue et civilisation françaises ==
The Institut de langue et civilisation françaises (ILCF) of the University of Neuchâtel, to which the Cours d’été (Summer course) is linked, is a centre for specialised studies in the teaching of French to non-native speakers (FLE).

During the academic year it provides:

- training in French language, literature and cultural studies
- specialised training for FLE teachers-to-be
- remedial French courses to non-French-speaking students of the various faculties (Swiss mobility and Erasmus)

== List of rectors since 1909 ==
=== Three-year period ===
- Arthur Piaget (1909–1911)
- Auguste Châtelain (1911–1913)
- Edouard Béguelin (1913–1915)
- Emile Dumont (1915–1917)
- Philippe Godet (1917–1919)
- Adrien Jaquerod (1919–1921)
- Charles Meckenstock (1921–1923)
- Paul Humbert (1923–1925)
- Alfred Lombard (1925–1927)
- Henri Rivier (1927–1929)
- Carl Ott (1929)
- Claude DuPasquier (1929–1931)
- Willy Corswant (1931–1933)
- Max Niedermann (1933–1935)
- Henri Spinner (1935–1937)
- Maurice Neeser (1937–1939)
- Georges Méautis (1939–1941)
- Robert Châbles (1941–1943)
- Carl Ott (1943–1945)
- Maurice Neeser (1945–1947)
- Eddy Bauer (1947–1949)
- Jean-Georges Baer (1949–1951)
- Paul-René Rosset (1951–1953)
- Jean-Daniel Burger (1953–1955)
- Charly Guyot (1955–1957)
- Felix Fiala (1957–1959)
- François Clerc (1959–1961)
- Jean-Louis Leuba (1961–1963)
- André Labhardt (1963–1965)
- Claude Favarger (1965–1967)
- Maurice Erard (1967–1969)
- Werner Soerensen (1969–1971)

=== Four-year period ===
- Werner Soerensen (1971–1975)
- Jean-Blaise Grize (1975–1979)
- Éric Jeannet (1979–1983)
- Jean Guinand (1983–1987)
- Rémy Scheurer (1987–1991)
- Denis Maillat (1991–1995)
- Francis Persoz (1995–1999)
- Denis Miéville (1999–2003)
- Hans-Heinrich Nägeli (co-recteur 2003)
- Michel Rousson (co-recteur 2003)
- Alfred Strohmeier (2004–2007)
- Jean-Pierre Derendinger (ad interim 2007–2008)
- Martine Rahier (2008–2016)
- Kilian Stoffel (2016–present)

=== Associated institutions ===
- École romande de santé publique (ERSP)

== People linked to the university ==
- Louis Agassiz
- Pierre Aubert
- Ünal Aysal
- Élisabeth Baume-Schneider
- Cassandre Berdoz
- Alain Berset
- Denise Berthoud
- Pierre du Bois de Dunilac
- Fernand Brunner
- Robert Forrest Burgess
- Martin Dibelius
- Yadolah Dodge
- Arnold van Gennep
- Pierre Graber
- François Grosjean
- Arnold Henri Guyot
- William Hatcher
- Hans Christian Henriksen
- Mimi Khalvati
- Stephan Klapproth
- Maurice Kottelat
- Michel Luc
- Dick Marty
- Denis Miéville
- Mohammad Mosaddegh
- Rosario Murillo
- Ye Peijian
- Max Petitpierre
- Jean Piaget
- Amélie Plume
- Edmond Privat
- Albert de Pury
- Roland de Pury
- Valentine Python
- Fritz de Quervain
- Martine Rebetez
- Élisée Reclus
- Arnold Reymond
- Yann Richter
- Denis de Rougemont
- Albert Schinz
- Gertrud Theiler
- Alison Wolf

== Honorary doctorates ==
- 1938 : Philippe Etter, Henri Meylan, Benigne Mentha
- 1943 : Ernest Ansermet
- 1945 : Eugène Mayor
- 1948 : Camille Gret, Léopold Defosses, Philippe Daulte
- 1949 : Léon Montandon
- 1957 : Martial Gueroult, Ernst Ackermann
- 1959 : Richard Paquier, Sidney de Coulon, Karl Oftinger, Hermann Hauser, Suzanne De Dietrich, Edgar Bonjour
- 1960 : Albert Dubois, Fritz Richner
- 1962 : André Chedel, Marti Frédéric, Ernest Stueckelberg
- 1963 : Claire Rosselet, Paul Geroudet
- 1965 : Marguerite Wutrich
- 1966 : Yvonne Marx
- 1967 : Louis Emberger, Théodore Monod
- 1969 : Bengt Hasselrot, Roger Perrot
- 1970 : Jürg Engi, Dom J.-Emmanuel Lanne
- 1971 : Max Moor, Henri Seyrig, Fred Uhler
- 1972 : Pierre Emmanuel, Rafael Armenteros
- 1973 : Paul-André Robert
- 1974 : Alfred Buehler
- 1975 : Kurt Stalder, Emile Walser
- 1976 : Gaston Clottu
- 1978 : Ralph Alexander Leigh, Jaques Courvoisier
- 1979 : Albert Henry
- 1980 : Gabrielle Berthoud, Georges Mangenot, Gérard Bauer, Jean-François Egli
- 1981 : Friedrich Dürrenmatt, Georges Millot, Paul Lacombe
- 1982 : Louis Euzet, Raymond Spira
- 1983 : Marc-Rodolphe Sauter, Théo Schneider, Claude Pichois
- 1984 : Maurice Gandillac, Hans Diggelmann
- 1985 : Christophe Senft
- 1986 : Yves Bonnefoy, François Chamous, Robert Darnton, Arnold Niederer, Joseph Flach, Michel Kervaire
- 1988 : Pierre Duquoc, France Quéré-Jaulmes, Pierre Vellas, Joseph Voyame, Ali Mehmet Celal Sengor, Jerzy Kostrowicki, Pierre Hadot
- 1989 : Alfred Hartmann, Gerd Theissen, Jean Starobinski, Nicolas Valticos, Calyampudi R. Rao, Pierre Pescatore
- 1990 : Eric Muller, David S. Landes, Jean-Pierre Blaser
- 1991 : Jean Rott, Albert Valdman, Paul Mazliak, Georges Reeb
- 1992 : Jean-Claude Perrin, David Cox, Jean-Jacques Gagnepain, Olivier Reverdin
- 1993 : Gerhard Ebeling, Sandor Kovacs, Ernst Heer, Jean-Baptiste Donnet, Jules Vuillemin, Hans-Georg Bandi
- 1994 : Georges Gusdorf, Peter J. Huber, Bernard Vittoz, André Tissot
- 1995 : Jean Pradel, Bernard Quemada, Hanz Merz
- 1996 : Thomas Bonhöffer, Nicolas Hayek, Norio Murata, Laurent Pauli, Inhelder Bärbel
- 1997 : Alexander von Zelewsky
- 1998 : François Vouga, René M. Stulz, Pierre Caspard
- 1999 : Claus-Dieter Ehlermann, Jelio Vladimirov
- 2000 : Marc Lienhard, Pierre Lieutaghi, Hans A. Luthy, Jean-Pierre Jelmini
- 2001 : Bertrand Reeb, Hans Rudolf Zulliger, Ross Chambers Guy Bovet
- 2002 : Sam Hedayat
- 2003 : David Hawking, Michel Waelbroeck, Peter Baccini, Ulrich Ruoff
- 2004 : Christophe Brandt, Nikolaus Amrhein, Luzius Wildhaber
- 2005 : Pierre Gresser, Hans-Joachim Güntherodt, Christian Gouriéroux, Eric Junod
- 2006 : Jean-Yves Empereur, Maurice Kottelat, Giuliano Amato
- 2007 : Michel Schlup, Joseph Deiss, Mario Botta
- 2008 : Kofi Annan, Rudolf Braun, Marcel Tanner, Aiming Wang
- 2009 : Michael Screech, Mikhaïl Leonidovitch Gromov, Jean-Pierre Roth, Leonardo Boff, Robert Badinter
- 2010 : Éric de Rosny, M. Guy Lapalme, Gilles Petitpierre, M. Roland Rust
- 2011 : Raymond Trousson, Ghislain de Marsily, Giorgio Malinverni, Wayne Arthur Fuller
- 2012: Roger Chartier, François L'Eplattenier, Herbert H. Clark
- 2019: Ivana Markova

== See also ==
- List of largest universities by enrollment in Switzerland
- List of modern universities in Europe (1801–1945)
