= List of ambassadors of Switzerland to Australia =

Ambassador of Switzerland to Australia
- Incumbent; Caroline Bichet-Anthamatten since 1 January 2022
- Style: Her Excellency
- Appointer: Swiss Federal Council
- Inaugural holder: Dr Friedrich Gygax
- Formation: 1961
- Website: Switzerland and Australia

The ambassador of Switzerland to Australia is an officer of the Swiss Federal Department of Foreign Affairs and the head of the Embassy of the Swiss Confederation to the Commonwealth of Australia. The position has the rank and status of an ambassador extraordinary and plenipotentiary and holds non-resident accreditation for Kiribati, Nauru, Papua New Guinea, the Solomon Islands and Vanuatu. The ambassador is based with the embassy in Forrest in Canberra.

The ambassador is currently Caroline Bichet-Anthamatten. Switzerland and Australia have enjoyed diplomatic relations since 1961, although consular representation has existed even before in Australia and its previous colonies: in Sydney since 1855, Melbourne since 1856, Brisbane since 1889, Adelaide since 1879 and consular agencies in Darwin (1978), Hobart (1968) and Perth (1971).

== Ambassadors, 1961–present ==
Incumbent	Start of term	End of term
Dr Friedrich Gygax	29 August 1961	23 March 1965
Egbert von Graffenried	2 September 1965	2 March 1970
Dr Max König	26 May 1970	31 December 1975
Marcel Grossenbacher	10 March 1976	30 November 1978
Dr Henri Rossi	3 March 1979	31 October 1984
Alfred Glesti	1 March 1985	22 August 1988
Dr Arnold Hugentobler	25 November 1988	5 May 1992
Peter Niederberger	7 September 1992	2 March 1996
Dr Bernhard Marfurt	1 April 1996	2000
André Faivet	4 May 2000	1 September 2004
Christian Mühlethaler	2004	2008
Dr Daniel Woker	2008	2012
Marcel Stutz	11 April 2012	September 2016
Pedro Zwahlen	12 October 2016	31 December 2021
Caroline Bichet-Anthamatten	1 January 2022	-

== Consuls and consuls-general ==
=== Consuls in Sydney, 1855–present ===
Incumbent	Start of term	End of term
Louis Chapalay (honorary consul)	1855	1865
August Parrot (honorary consul)	1875	1880
Friedrich Plüss (honorary consul)	1881	1884
Conrad Staehelin-Werner (honorary consul)	1884	1890
Jakob Roth (honorary consul)	1890	1891
Max Rutty (honorary consul)	1896	1918
Olav Pauss (honorary consul)	1918	1920
Eugen Bloch (honorary consul)	1920	1931
Eugen Bloch (honorary consul-general)	1931	1933
Hans Georg Hedinger (honorary consul-general)	1933	1941
Hans Georg Hedinger (consul-general)	1941	1961
Jakob Huber (consul-general)	1961	1967
Henri Jung (consul-general)	1967	1974
Raymond Tellenbach (consul-general)	1975	1985
Richard Wolf (consul-general)	1985	1988
Hans-Peter Egger (consul-general)	1988	1992
Hans Meier (consul-general)	1992	1997
Heinz Wey (consul-general)	1997	2001
Albert Mehr (consul-general)	2001	2005
Jürg Casserini (consul-general)	2005	2009
Markus Meli (consul-general)	2009	2013
Ernst Steinmann (consul-general)	2013	2017
Bernadette Hunkeler Brown (consul-general)	2017	2022
Cornelia Camenzind (consul-general)	2022	-

=== Consuls in Melbourne, 1856–present ===
Incumbent	Start of term	End of term
Achilles Bischoff (honorary Vice-consul)	1856	1857
Achilles Bischoff (honorary consul)	1857	1859
Samuel Rentsch (honorary consul)	1859	1864
Frédéric Guillaume de Pury (honorary consul)	1875	1890
Charles Martin (honorary consul)	1891	1906
Gustav Stahel (honorary consul)	1907	1921
Gustav Stahel (honorary consul-general)	1921	1928
Paul Louis Frossard (honorary consul-general)	1928	1931
Emile Bisang (honorary consul-general)	1931	1932
Johannes Alexander Pietzcker (honorary consul)	1932	1951
Paul-Emile Cattin (honorary consul)	1951	1958
Edwin Steiner (honorary consul)	1958	1963
Curt Mahnig (honorary consul)	1964	1970
Urs Karli (honorary consul)	1971	1975
Werner Zellweger (honorary consul)	1975	1980
Werner Zellweger (consul-general)	1980	1983
Henning Rieder (consul-general)	1983	1986
Günter Britschgi (consul-general)	1987	1990
Leo Renggli (consul-general)	1990	1995
Bernard Sandoz (consul-general)	1995	????
Erika Esther Kimpton (honorary consul)	2007	2016
Manuela Erb (honorary consul)	2016	-

=== Consuls in Adelaide ===
Incumbent	Start of term	End of term
James Page (honorary Vice-consul)	30 December 1879	31 December 1913
Eduard Willis Van Senden (honorary Vice-consul)	6 November 1914	31 December 1918
Paul Anton Richter (honorary consul)	3 June 1969	????
René Pfister (honorary consul)	28 June 2000	2019
Patrick Wille (honorary consul)	2019	-

=== Consuls in Brisbane ===
Incumbent	Start of term	End of term
Jakob Leutenegger (honorary consul)	5 March 1889	1909
George Gross (honorary consul)	17 March 1909	30 June 1909
William Schoch (honorary consul)	25 July 1910	1925
Henri Schaub (honorary consul)	4 November 1926	1960
Daniel Gschwind (honorary consul)	23 April 2008	-

=== Consuls in Perth ===
Incumbent	Start of term	End of term
Rudolf Hermann Abplanalp (honorary consul)	11 August 1971	30 June 1993
Prof. Ernst Jürg Weber (honorary consul)	1 July 1993	2023

== See also ==
- Australia–Switzerland relations
- Foreign relations of Switzerland
- List of ambassadors of Australia to Germany (accredited to Switzerland)
