= Martine Rebetez =

Swiss climatologist

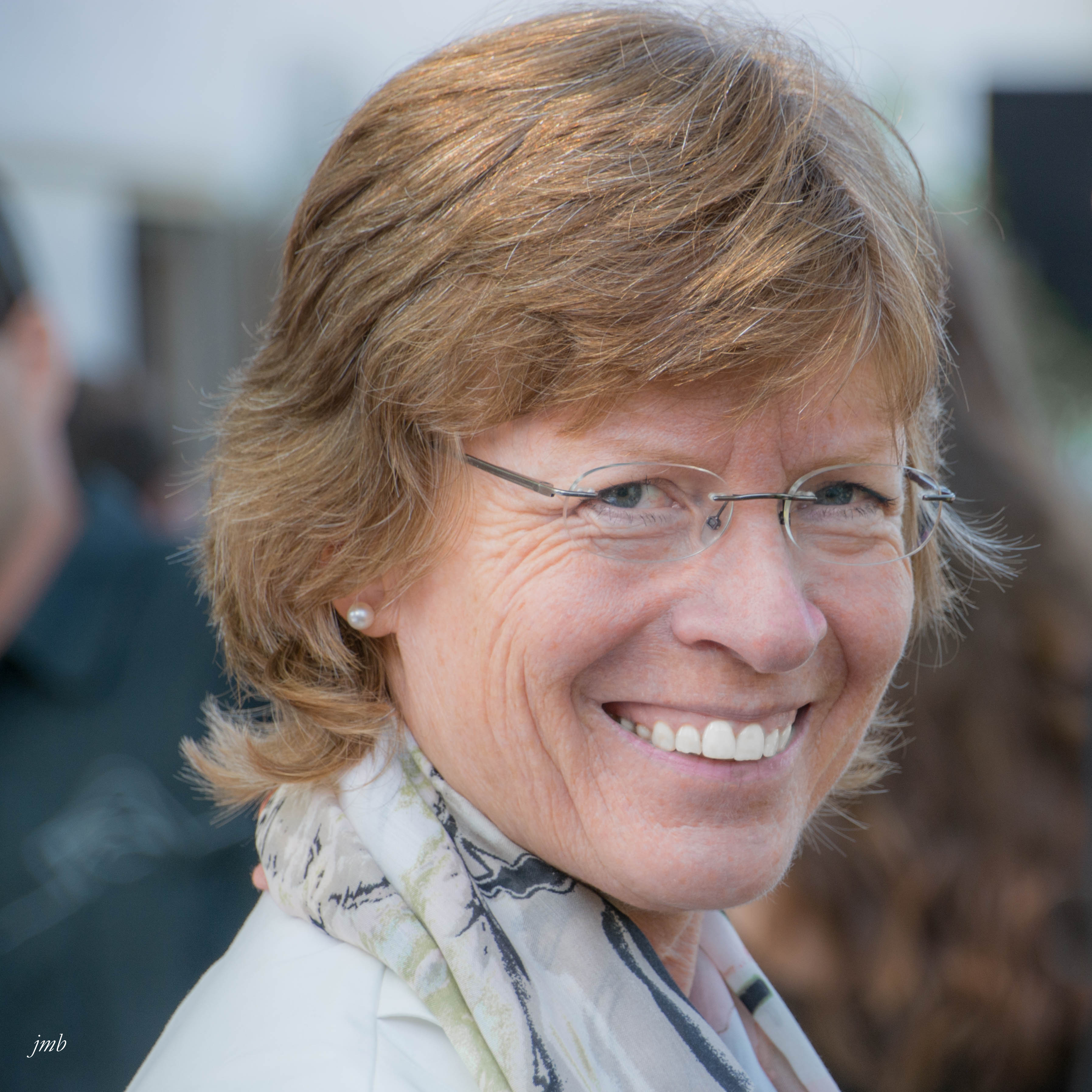
- Born: 25 May 1961; Oron-la-Ville
- Alma mater: University of Lausanne
- Occupation: University teacher; climatologist; researcher
- Employer: Swiss Federal Institute for Forest, Snow and Landscape Research; University of Neuchâtel

Martine Rebetez (born 1961) is a Swiss climatologist. She is a professor at the University of Neuchâtel and a senior scientist at Swiss Federal Institute for Forest, Snow and Landscape Research WSL.

== Biography ==
Rebetez studied geography and climatology at the University of Lausanne, Zurich and Salford from 1979 to 1985. She received her doctorate from 1987 to 1992 at the University of Lausanne and was subsequently a. a. employed at the University of Freiburg and the University of Neuchâtel. From 1996 to 2006, she was a research fellow at the Swiss Federal Institute for Forest, Snow and Landscape Research WSL before being appointed as a senior scientist at the same institute. In 2017, she was appointed as a professor at the University of Neuchâtel.

== Works ==
Rebetez's scientific work deals with climate change, especially in Switzerland, as well as with the consequences of climate change for forests, alpine tourism and snow. She contributed to the understanding of the effects of global warming on winter tourism in the context of the climate crisis. In 2016, it was able to prove that the skiing and sledding season in the Alps was shortened by more than a month for Switzerland compared to 1970; accordingly there are more extreme weather, longer periods of drought and greater precipitation events.

In 2019, Rebetez commented benevolently on the concerns of the climate protection movement Fridays for Future: "According to Antoine de St-Exupéry, we do not inherit the land from our parents, but rather borrow it from our children. Today the new generation asks us to give an account of what we have done with the land that we borrowed from them."

Rebetez also looks at people's perceptions of climate change. Her investigation of the changed perception of white Christmas over time attracted media attention; using a comparison of Christmas postcards, she was able to show that the ideal idea of a snowy Christmas festival only spread around the world from around 1860 onwards.
