= Australia–Switzerland relations =

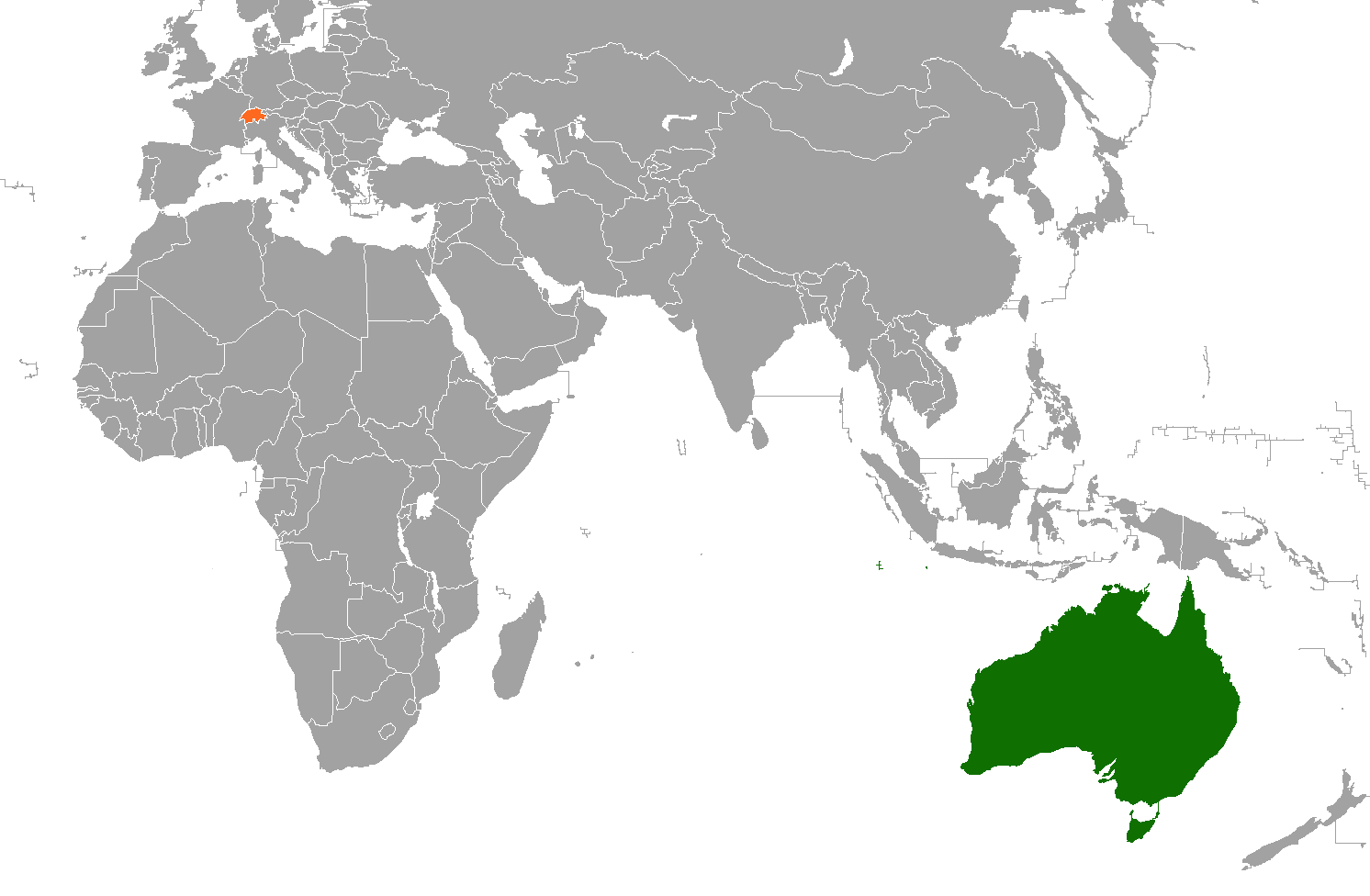

- Australia: Switzerland

Monthly value of Australian merchandise exports to Switzerland (A$ millions) since 1988

Monthly value of Swiss merchandise exports to Australia (A$ millions) since 1988

Foreign relations exist between Australia and Switzerland. Switzerland opened a consulate in Sydney in 1855 and one in Melbourne in 1856. Both countries established diplomatic relations in 1961. Switzerland has an embassy in Canberra, a consulate-general in Sydney and 6 honorary consulates in Adelaide, Brisbane, Darwin, Hobart, Melbourne and Perth. In November 2022, Australia opened an embassy in Bern and maintains a consulate-general in Geneva.

== Resident diplomatic missions ==
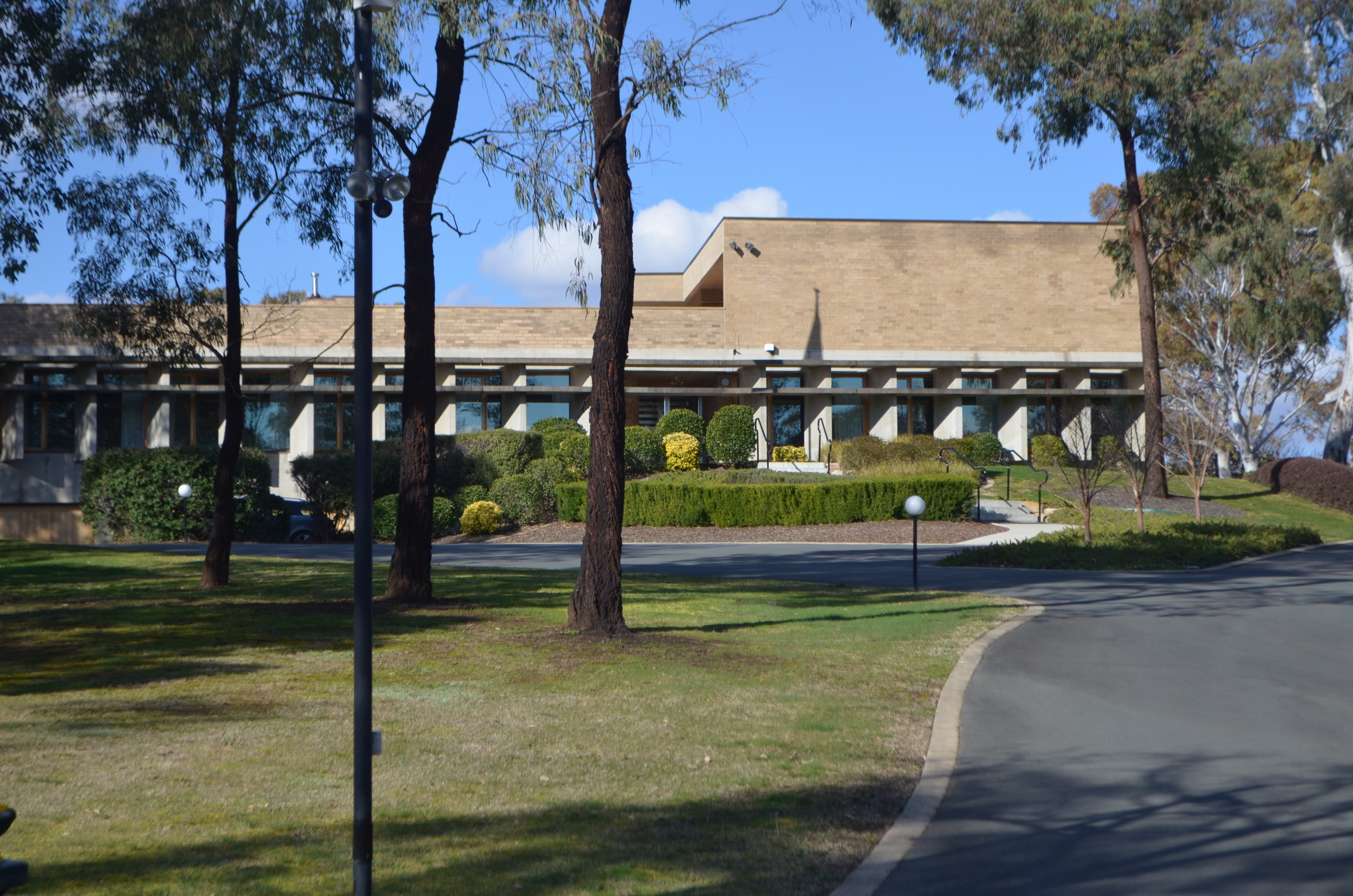
Embassy of Switzerland in Canberra

- Australia has an embassy in Bern and a consulate-general in Geneva.
- Switzerland has an embassy in Canberra and a consulate-general in Sydney.

== See also ==
- List of Swiss Ambassadors to Australia
- Foreign relations of Australia
- Foreign relations of Switzerland
- Swiss Australian
