= Victor Goldschmidt (philosopher) =

French philosopher and historian

Victor Goldschmidt (1914 – 25 September 1981) was a French philosopher and historian of philosophy.

Born in Germany, he came to France in 1933. Before the war he studied at the Sorbonne and at the École pratique des hautes études under Henri Marguerite.

Goldschmidt "made his name with the publication of his thesis, Les Dialogues de Platon, in 1947", for which Martial Gueroult was among the members of his examining committee. He taught at the University of Rennes from 1956 to 1966, then at Clermont-Ferrand from 1966 to 1976 and finally in Amiens until his death.

The manuscript of Goldschmidt's book on Aristotle's views of time was delivered to the editor on the eve of his death.

A volume was published in his memory as Histoire et Structure (1985).

Though Goldschmidt is often considered a disciple of Martial Gueroult, Jacques Brunschwig has reconsidered their relationship, noting that the second edition of Godschmidt's thesis acknowledged a general debt to the "rigor" of Émile Bréhier rather than Gueroult.

== Works ==
- Essai sur le Cratyle (Essay on Cratylus), 1940.
- Les Dialogues de Platon (The Dialogues of Plato), 1944. 2nd ed., 1963.
- Le paradigme dans la dialectique platonicienne (Exemplification in Platonic dialectic), 1947
- Le Système stoïcien et l'idée de temps (The Stoic system and the idea of time), Paris, Vrin, 1953.
- 'A propos de Descartes selon l'ordre des raisons ', Revue de métaphysique et de morale, 1957.
- Platonisme et pensée contemporaine (Platonism and contemporary thought), 1970.
- Questions platoniciennes (Platonic questions), 1970.
- Anthropologie et politique, les principes du système de Rousseau (Anthropology and politics: the principles of Rousseau's system), 1974.
- La doctrine d'Epicure et le droit (The doctrine of Epicurus and right), 1978.
- 'Remarques sur la méthode structurale en histoire de la philosophie ' (Notes on the structural method in the history of philosophy), in Métaphysique, Histoire de la philosophie. Recueil d'études offert à Fernand Brunner à l'occasion de son 60ème anniversaire, Neuchâtel, 1981, p. 213-240.
- 'Préface' and 'La théorie épicurienne du droit', in Jonathan Barnes et al., Science and Speculation: studies in Hellenistic theory and practice, Cambridge: Cambridge University Press, 1982.
- Temps physique et temps tragique chez Aristote: Commentaire sur le Quatrième livre de la Physique (10-14) et sur la Poétique (Physical time and tragic time in Aristotle: Commentary on the fourth book of the Physics (10-14) and on the Poetics).
