= Arnold Reymond =

Swiss philosopher

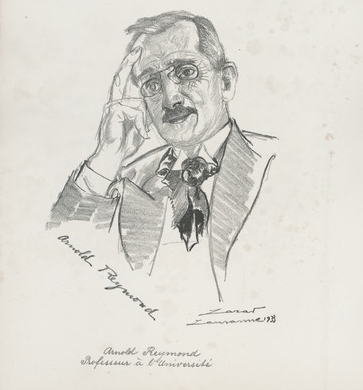
- portrait from 1933 by Oskár Lázár

Arnold Reymond (1874–1958) was a Swiss theologian, philosopher (logician) and historian of science.

== Life ==
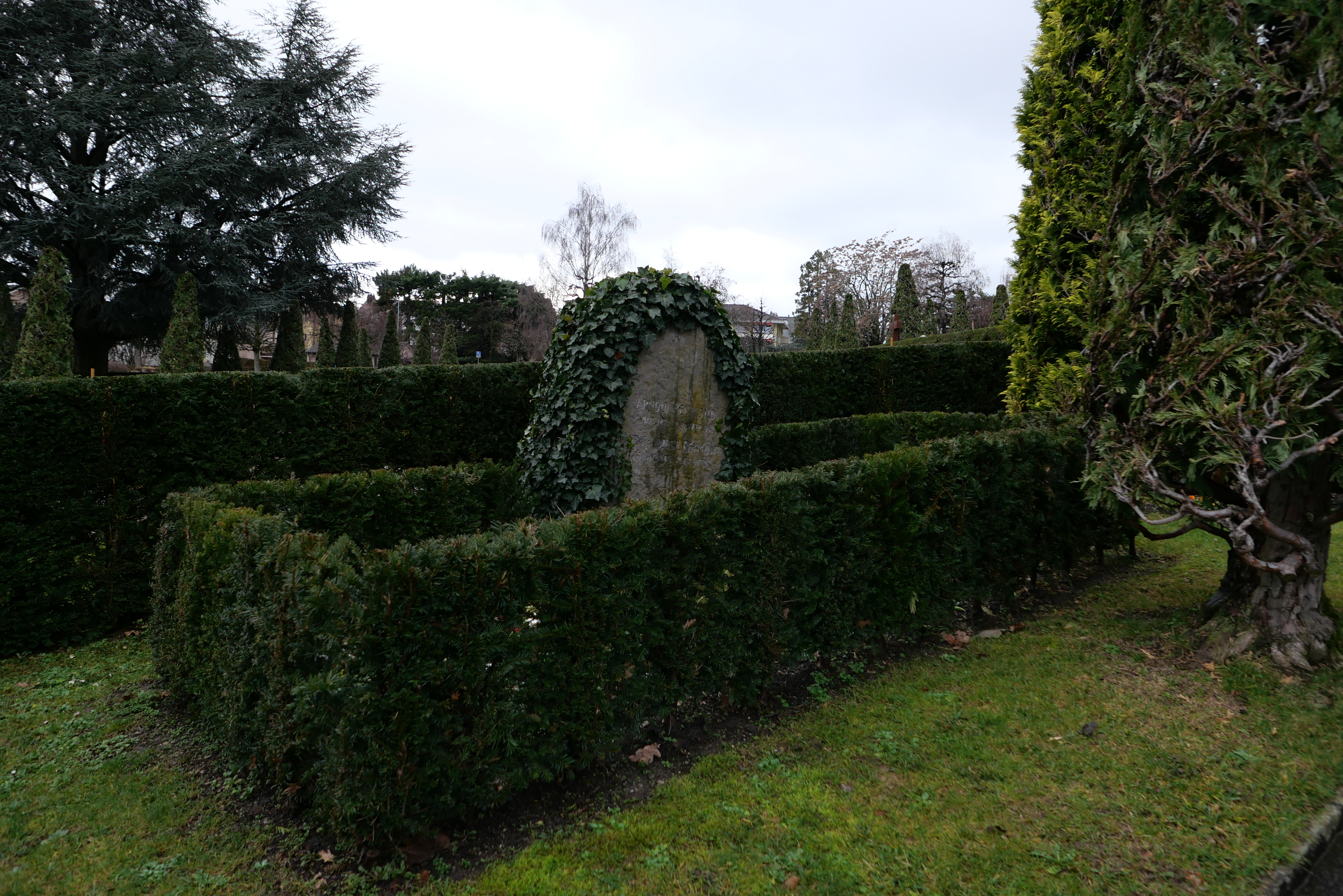
The grave of Reymond and his wife Marie-Louise, née Maurer (1885-1976), at the cemetery of Pully.

Reymond received a doctorate from the University of Geneva in 1908; his thesis on the history of ideas of the infinite, Logique et mathématiques, was reviewed by Bertrand Russell in Mind. Reymond taught at the University of Neuchâtel from 1912 to 1925, where he taught and influenced Jean Piaget. In 1925 he took up a chair at the University of Lausanne.

== Works ==
- Logique et mathématiques: essai historique et critique sur le nombre infini, Saint-Blaise: Foyer Solidariste, 1908
- Histoire des sciences exactes et naturelles dans l'Antiquité gréco-romaine, Paris: 1924. Translated as History of the sciences in Greco-Roman antiquity, New York: E. P. Dutton & Co., 1927
- Les penseurs de la Grèce; histoire de la philosophie antique, 1928
- Les principes de la logique et la critique contemporaine, 1932
- Philosophie spiritualiste; études et méditations, recherches critiques, 1942
- L'Histoire des sciences et la philosophie des sciences, 1949
