= Alexander von Zelewsky =

Swiss chemist (1936–2021)

Alexander von Zelewsky (born 17 July 1936, Zurich, Switzerland, died 25 January 2021, Fribourg) was a full Professor in chemistry at the University of Fribourg in Fribourg, Switzerland, from 1969 to 2006.

== Career ==
After obtaining his diploma in 1960 at the ETHZ, Alexander von Zelewsky did his Ph.D (1960 - 1964) under the direction of Professors Walter Schneider and Gerold Schwarzenbach on "EPR-Spektren von Komplexen des zweiwertigen Kupfers mit Pyridin und Pyridinderivaten". He then became a Miller fellow at the University of California, Berkeley, under Professor Robert E. Connick.

In 1967 he went back to Switzerland to become lecturer at ETHZ (1967 - 1969) and later full Professor of inorganic chemistry at the University of Fribourg (1969 - 2006). During these years his fields of interests were EPR spectroscopy as well as synthesis and characterization of coordination compounds.

Alexander von Zelewsky was the Dean of the Faculty of Science of the University of Fribourg from 1974 to 1975 and from 2000 to 2002, the president of the Swiss Chemical Society between 1997 and 1999 and the president of the Swiss National Science Foundation (Science division) from 1984 to 1992.

== Awards ==
- 1964 Silver medal of the ETHZ.
- 1965 - 1967 Miller Fellowship.
- 1997 Honorary Ph.D degree at the University of Neuchâtel, Neuchâtel, Switzerland.

== Selected publications ==
- A. von Zelewsky; Stereochmeistry of Coordination Compounds, Wiley 1996
- Ulrich Knof, A. von Zelewsky; Predetermined Chirality at Metal Centers, Angew. Chemie, Int. Ed. 1999, 38 (3), 302-322
- P. Hayoz, A. von Zelewsky, H. Stoeckli-Evans; Stereoselective synthesis of octahedral complexes with predetermined helical chirality, J. Am. Chem. Soc. 1993, 115 (12), 5111-5114
- L. Chassot, A. von Zelewsky; Cyclometalated complexes of platinum(II): homoleptic compounds with aromatic C, N ligands, Inorg. Chem. 1987, 26 (17), 2814-2818
- O. Mamula, A. von Zelewsky; Supramolecular coordination compounds with chiral pyridine and polypyridine ligands derived from terpenes, Coord. Chem. Rev. 2003, 242 (1-2), 87-95
- O. Mamula, A. von Zelewsky, T. Bark, G. Bernardinelli; Stereoselective Synthesis of Coordination Compounds: Self-Assembly of a Polymeric Double Helix with Controlled Chirality, Angew. Chemie, Int. Ed. 1999, 38 (19), 2945-2948
- A. Juris, V. Balzani, F. Barigelletti, S. Campagna, P. Belser, A. von Zelewsky; Ru(II) polypyridine complexes: photophysics, photochemistry, electrochemistry, and chemiluminescence, Coord. Chem. Rev. 1988, 84, 85-277
