= Yadolah Dodge =

Iranian and Swiss statistician

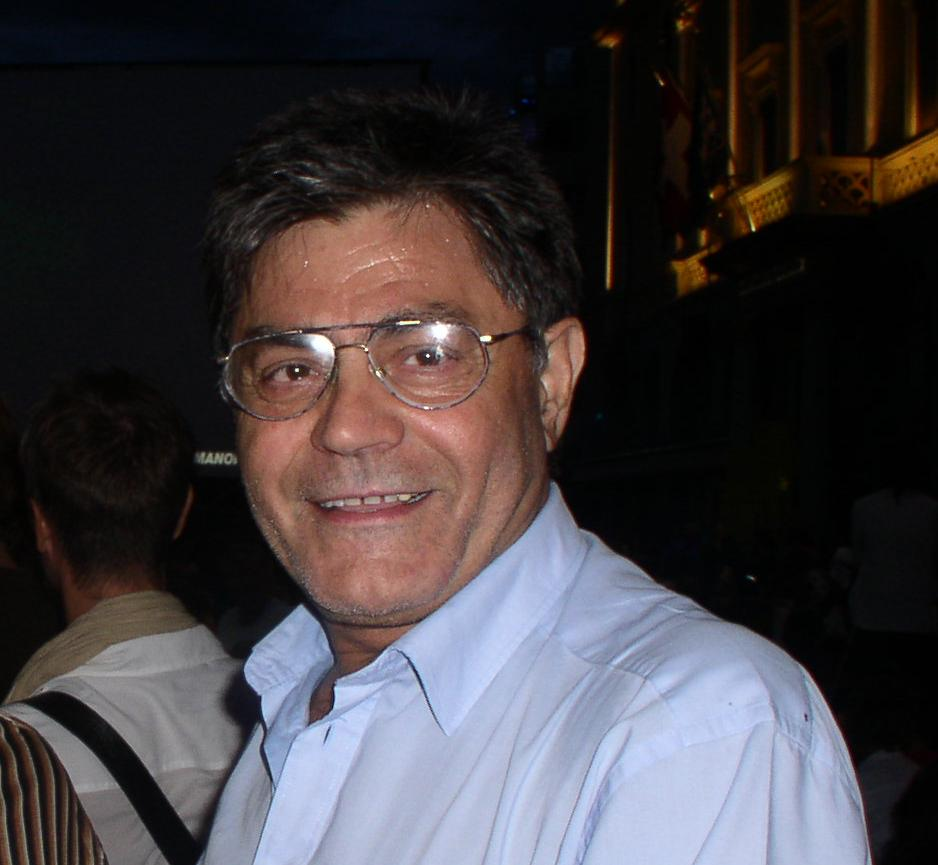
- Born: Abadan, Iran
- Education: Utah State University; Oregon State University
- Known for: Regression
- Scientific career
- Fields: Statistics

Yadolah Dodge (Persian: یدالله داج, also Romanized as "Yadollāh Dāj") is an Iranian and Swiss statistician. His major contributions are in the theory of operational research, design of experiments, simulation, and regression.

== Early life ==
He spent his early years in Abadan, Iran. He went then to the Gundeshapur or Jundi Shapour University and obtained his Post Licentiate in Engineering in Agriculture in 1966 with distinction. He got his PhD at the Oregon State University in 1974.

== Work ==
In the 1980s he became professor of statistics at the University of Neuchâtel, Switzerland, where as of 2011 he is a professor emeritus. He is author of more than 60 papers and 25 books, many of which have appeared in multiple editions. In 2015 Professor Dodge started the 'Iranian Film Festival Zurich' in order to have a cultural exchange between Iran and Switzerland.

== Selected publications ==
- Arthanari, T.S. and Y Dodge, Y. Mathematical Programming in Statistics, Wiley, 1993. ISBN 0-471-59212-9
- Birkes, D. and Dodge, Y. Alternative Methods of Regression, Wiley, 1993, ISBN 0-471-56881-3
- Dodge, Y., Analysis of Experiments with Missing Data, John Wiley & Sons, 1985, ISBN 0471887366.
- Dodge, Y., and Jureckovà, J. Adaptive regression. Springer-Verlag, 2000 ISBN 978-1-4419-8766-2.
- Dodge, Y. (ed.), The Oxford Dictionary of Statistical Terms, Oxford University Press, Oxford, 2003. ISBN 0-19-850994-4
- Dodge, Y. and Rousson, V. Analyse de regression appliquée, Dunod, 1999. ISBN 0-19-850994-4
- Dodge, Y. and Melfi, G. Premiers pas en simulation, Springer, Paris, 2008. ISBN 978-2-287-79493-3
- Dodge, Y., The Concise Encyclopedia of Statistics, 2008, Springer ISBN 978-0-387-33828-6
