= Germaine Ribière =

French Catholic and member of the Résistance

Germaine Ribière (13 April 1917 in Limoges, Haute-Vienne – 20 November 1999) was a French Catholic, member of the Résistance, who saved numerous Jews during World War II, and was recognized as a Righteous Among the Nations (July 18, 1967, Yad Vashem, Jerusalem, Israel).

== The Résistance and the rescuing of Jews ==
As a student at the University of Paris, Germaine Ribière reacted against the discrimination against the Jews, noting for example in her diary in May 1941: "Those who should be awake are those who put the others to sleep", then in June 1941: "The Church, the hierarchy, remain silent. They let the truth be profaned". In May 1941, Germaine Ribière was present during the arrest of Jews in the Marais, the old Jewish neighborhood of Paris (also known as the Pletzl).

Deciding that her place was no more in Paris, she went to Vichy, where she got involved in the journal Cahiers du Témoignage Chrétien and the organisation Amitié Chrétienne.

During the roundups in the Zone libre, in Haute-Vienne, Creuse and Indre, on August 26 and in September 1942, Germaine Ribière and Pastor Chaudier of Limoges provided hideouts in non-Jewish families for the children of the homes of the OSE of Masgelier and of Chabannes. The physician of that organisation, Gaston Lévy, who called Germaine Ribière, "our heroine of times of distress" testifies:

It's almost from the very start of our arrival in Limoges that a clear-sighted and efficient help was given to me by Mademoiselle Germaine Ribière in all my activities. Born in Limoges in a deeply religious catholic family, she was at the time when she came to offer me her help at the day nursery, responsible of the JEC (Jeunesse etudiante chrétienne).

She was seen with an evangelic spirit, an unselfish love of her neighbour. She suffered visibly from the situation done to us, us Jews. Prior to coming to see me at the day nursery, her revolt against the Hitler–Vichy persecution had already a certain efficiency. She had stayed a certain time next to the internees of the appalling "Center of Housing" of Récébedou. and went to the camp of Gurs (Gurs internment camp). Her report on the dreadful circumstances in which the internees vegetated led to the Pastoral letter of Cardinal Jules Saliège of Toulouse, of August 23, 1942, severely condemning the Jewish persecutions. Germaine Ribière, as we shall see later, has done tremendously in this tragic period to save Jewish lives. She remained faithfully at our side in all the rescue actions of children in danger, as she remained to this day a faithful friend of Israel.

On August 23, 1942, the O.S.E., the Eclaireurs Israélites de France, the Amitiés Chrétiennes and several other humanitarian organisations, joined the «screening» committee of the 1200 Jews of around Lyon arrested during the roundups of the summer of 1942 and interned in the camp at Vénissieux.

The committee managed to save at once 160 adults, of which 80 are again taken in for questioning the following day, besides 108 children. This tragic event is known under the name of Night of Vénissieux. The O.S.E., the Amitiés Chrétiennes and l'Action catholique of Germaine Ribière refused to give back the children despite the orders given by Vichy to the regional prefect Angéli to not separate the families. They are dispersed with false papers in catholic institutions, under the watch of the O.S.E.

Germaine Ribière took care to provide false papers to those in need and to supply to Resistance fighters materials to produce them. She was helped in this task by the draftsman Jean Setten-Bernard.

The Amitié Chrétienne, where Germaine Ribière belonged, was founded in Lyon in 1941, with the goal to help the Jews and other victims subjugated to the decrees of Vichy and the occupier.

On January 27, 1943, that organisation held an emergency meeting in Lyon at the domicile of the Swiss Protestant pastor Roland de Pury, in order to find the way to warn the Jews coming to get false papers that the offices of the Union générale des israélites de France (UGIF, General Organization of Jews in France), rue Sainte-Catherine were watched by the Gestapo.

The solution found was that Germaine Ribière, as soon as the next morning would pass herself off as a cleaning lady cleaning the stairs and would warn these people not to enter the building.

== Acts of courage ==
Germaine Ribière intervened to produce a false identity card for Jean-Marie Soutou (1912–2003), great driving force of the catholic résistance (Amitiés Judéo-Chrétiennes), incarcerated at the Montluc prison, at Lyon. The document is passed on to him in a pen, and he succeeded in reaching Switzerland.

To accompany a convoy towards the line of demarcation, Germaine Ribière dressed up as a nurse, as is recalled by Gaston Lévy:

She had succeeded to be let in the train de deportees leaving Nexon as an escort nurse. In accompanying these pauvres gens until the line of demarcation she didn't content herself to be a moral support for them and to give some treatments to those who felt ill in the midst of these tragic convoys, but she brought back from this trip much useful information, indications and addresses that people had given, relative to those, the elderly, children, sick persons, that they were leaving behind.

At Limoges, she succeeded in warning the great majority of Jews at risk of being taken in for questioning. Thus, only a limited number of persons, about 100, instead of the 1200 foreseen were arrested.

With Antoinette Feuerwerker, the wife of David Feuerwerker, the rabbi of Brive-la-Gaillarde, she took charge of the evacuation of young people wanted by the occupying authority.

== The Finaly Affair ==
Robert and Gérald Finaly, two Jewish children, were hidden during the Occupation by a Catholic network, where Mlle Antoinette Brun was a member. The war over, Mme Brun refused to return to the Finaly family these children who had become orphans, that she had baptized in 1948. This was the beginning of the Finaly Affair [see Jewish orphans controversy (section Finaly Affair)]. It was only in 1953 that the two brothers were reunited with their family living in Israel.

Germaine Ribière who was trusted both by the Jewish community and by the Catholic Church served as a go-between.

=== Her involvement in the Finaly Affair ===
End March 1953: The French Cardinal of the Roman Catholic Church of Lyon, Primat des Gaules, Pierre-Marie Gerlier, asked Germaine Ribière to find the Finaly children at the Basque Country.

June 11, 1953: At Lyon, Germaine Ribière informed Cardinal Pierre Gerlier that the Finaly children were held by Basques, in particular by priests.

June 25, 1953: The Court of Cassation having decided that the Finaly children were to be returned to their Jewish family, 48 hours later, Germaine Ribière made her last trip to Spain, to find them. The Finaly children were led to the French Consulate at San Sebastián, in Spain, on June 25. Germaine Ribière brought them back to France, accompanied all over France by a motorcycle escort, to the property of the banker André Weil, close to Senlis, Oise, where they met their paternal aunt and legal guardian, Hedwige Rosner.

== Testimonies ==
=== Righteous Among the Nations ===
At the Panthéon, in Paris, on January 18, 2007, on the occasion of the national ceremony in honor of the Righteous of France, the President of the French Republic, Jacques Chirac declared: "What a courage, what a generosity of spirit they needed!". He learns from it a lesson: "You, Righteous of France, you have transmitted to the Nation an essential message, for today and tomorrow: the refusal of indifference, of blindness." At this same ceremony, Simone Veil, President of the Fondation pour la Mémoire de la Shoah declared: "The Righteous of France thought simply having gone through History. In reality, they wrote it".

The biographical note published by the Yad Vashem, recalls the life of Germaine Ribière, who received the title of Righteous Among the Nations and concludes: "Ribière was a unique individual - a catholique believer and a French patriot who dedicated all her forces and her talents to the supreme mission to save Jews".

=== Germaine Ribière's altruism ===
After observing the roundups of the Jews in Paris, Germaine Ribière notes in her diary: "I ache for them in my whole being, I ache for my Jewish brothers and sisters"., but also declares:"In the presence of hatred I feel an icy chill... Hatred is not the world of God, it is the refusal of God".

Walking, in 1985, in the streets of Paris with Eva Fleischner and seeing a little girl aged two, Germaine Ribière asks herself if she is not lost and might be looking for her mother. For Eva Fleischner, this attitude is typical of her character: "She is Germaine Ribière because she notices a little girl who may be lost and in need of her help, in the middle of Paris in 1985, just as the Jews needed help during the war."

=== Gerda Bikales ===
It took sixty years for Gerda Bikales to discover the identity of the person who had saved her life and the life of her mother.

For sixty years, I knew nothing about the woman who had saved my life on that cold February morning in 1943. Not her name, not how she came to be there, not what happened to her afterwards.

At the height of Nazi persecution, my mother and I were Jewish refugees from Germany trying to survive illegally in Lyon, France. Though we tried to be inconspicuous and avoided official premises of any kind, we nevertheless had to appear periodically at the headquarters of the UGIF (Union Générale des Israélites de France) on Rue Ste. Catherine. This was where the "Jewish Council" was located, and where Jews had to report every so often to receive their ration coupons.

The UGIF was an instrument of the occupying Nazi bureaucracy which appointed such councils in all the occupied territories and forced them to cooperate in rounding up their fellow Jews. At the time, we did not fully grasp the nefarious role of the Council but we always feared potential trouble in a place where only Jews congregated.

That morning, I accompanied my mother as she went to collect food stamps. I had stopped going to school because people were arrested at all hours, in their homes and on the street, and I was afraid to separate from my mother for even a short time. We had learned to look for signs of danger everywhere, and as we neared our destination, we cased the surroundings. All seemed normal, so we entered the building and started up the flight of stairs. Halfway up we noticed that the woman who was busy cleaning the first-floor landing was waving her hands at us, discreetly signaling us to leave. We didn't ask any questions, just turned around and left.

Later that day we learned that the Gestapo had taken over the UGIF office that morning, without betraying any hint of their presence. For several hours, they had trapped unsuspecting people as they entered the office. Over ninety people were arrested in that raid, and eighty-four were deported.

Since that day, I have often wondered about the woman who saved our lives. Was she the janitor, who had observed the Germans enter but not leave? Was she an office worker somewhere in the building? Or maybe a tenant in one of the apartments? One thing I knew for sure. She had risked her life to warn Jews of the danger awaiting them. Had she not been there that morning, I would not be here now to tell the story.

Many years later, my husband was vaguely talking about retirement when he received an invitation to take a new post in Paris. Without hesitation, we moved to France. I visited Lyon, and found myself in front of 12 Rue Ste. Catherine. The 1943 Gestapo raid that had nearly ensnared me was memorialized with a modest plaque affixed at the building entrance, placed there by the Jewish community of Lyon.

In Paris, I attended a lecture and book signing by Germaine Ribière, the author of a newly published memoir about the Finaly affair, which had gripped French society for eight years immediately following the war. At the center of the drama was the fate of two young boys, Robert, born in 1941, and Gerald, born in 1942. Their parents, Fritz and Annie Finaly, had sought refuge in France after their native Austria was annexed to Nazi Germany - to little avail. They were deported from Nazi-occupied France in 1944. Before their arrest, the parents had found shelter for their children in a convent, from which they were later transferred to a municipal nursery run by a devout Catholic woman who had them baptized.

After the war, when it was determined that the boys' parents had been killed in Auschwitz, the Church refused to release the children to their surviving aunt, who lived in Israel. At issue was the assertion by the Vatican that no child baptized in the Catholic Church could be allowed to grow up in a Jewish home. A long and bitter custody battle ensued. The French court's final ruling favored the aunt. Ignoring the verdict, the church had whisked away the children to a convent in Spain. Germaine Ribière played a pivotal role in negotiating their eventual release and their safe return to their Israeli aunt.

Germaine Ribière was by now very elderly, her voice barely audible. I bought the book and asked her to inscribe it to me, which she graciously agreed to do despite an unsteady hand. I slowly spelled my unusual name for her, and thanked her.

After some interesting years in Paris, my newly retired husband spent ample time reading a wide range of publications. One day, he called out excitedly, "You won't believe this! - read this!" He handed me a small French periodical, open to the obituary page. It announced the death at an advanced age, of Germaine Ribière, a Catholic Resistance fighter who had rescued many Jews during the Holocaust years. Among her numerous exploits, mention was made of her presence during the UGIF raid in February 1943. Upon espying that the Gestapo had taken over the office in Lyon, she had dressed as a cleaning woman to warn Jews of lurking danger.

After the war, she resumed her career as a scientist and remained a devout member of her church. But she stayed close to the traumatized Jewish community, becoming its advocate in epic struggles for the custody of Jewish orphans hidden with Catholic families or in Catholic institutions. She had published a book about her role in recovering the Finaly children, who had been hidden in Spain to keep them away from their surviving Jewish relatives.

So, sixty years later I learned something about my rescuer. Sadly, I also discovered that our paths had crossed, without any awareness on either side of the bond between us.

Postscript: Coincidences don't always lead to happy endings. They sometimes leave us with deep regrets about what could have happened, but didn't. How satisfying it would have been to thank my rescuer for the gift of life, my own and my mother's! For Germaine, burdened by the infirmities of old age, it would have been a meaningful encounter, so many years later, with a child she had pulled back from the edge of catastrophe.

Still, I am pleased to know more about this courageous woman. In my travels, I have looked for her name on the Righteous Gentiles memorial at Yad Vashem, in the United States Holocaust Memorial Museum in Washington, D.C., and just recently, on the new Wall of the Righteous in Paris. I think of her often, with affection and gratitude. She is no longer a vague, anonymous figure in my mind. Her country and the Jewish community have honored her, and honored themselves by doing so. And I take special pride in my heroine.

== Movies on the Finaly Affair ==
- Une enfance volée : l'affaire Finaly, directed by Fabrice Génestal. Scenario, adaptation and dialogues by Philippe Bernard, in collaboration with the historian Catherine Poujol. Produced by Elizabeth Arnac for Lizland Films. This made-for-TV movie, shot in April 2008, for France 2 was broadcast by this network on Tuesday November 25, 2008 with Charlotte de Turckheim (Mademoiselle Brun) and Pierre Cassignard.
- The documentary L'affaire Finaly, the documentary by David Korn-Brzoza, was also broadcast by France 2, on Tuesday November 25, 2008. Written by Noel Mamère, Alain Moreau and David Korn-Brzoza, it was produced by la société de production Program 33 for France 3.

== Bibliography ==
- Paul Greveillac, Les fronts clandestins : quinze histoires de Justes, 'Le Rhône' short story, Nicolas Eybalin publishing, 2014. ISBN 978-2-36665-000-6
- Jack Bemporad, John Pawlikowksi, Joseph Sievers. Good and Evil After Auschwitz: Ethical Implications for Today. KTAV Publishing House, 2000. ISBN 0-88125-692-7, ISBN 978-0-88125-692-5. [See, p. 206.].
- Roger Berg. Histoire du rabbinat français. (XVIè-XXè siècles). Patrimoines. Judaïsme. Cerf: Paris, 1992. [Préface du grand rabbin Jacob Kaplan, membre de l'Institut]. ISBN 2-204-04252-8
- Gerda Bikales. Getting To Know Germaine In: Yitta Halberstam & Judith Leventhal. Small Miracles of the Holocaust. Extraordinary Coincidences of Faith, Hope, and Survival. The Lyons Press: Guilford, Connecticut, 2008, pp. 194–197.ISBN 978-1-59921-407-8
- Joyce Block-Lazarus. In the Shadow of Vichy. The Finaly Affair. Peter Lang. 2008. ISBN 1-4331-0212-9, ISBN 978-1-4331-0212-7.
- Emilio Boccarini, Lucy Thorson. Il Bene e il male dopo Auschwitz: implicazionietico-teologiche per l'oggi: atti del simposio internazionale, Roma, 22-25 settembre 1997. Paoline, 1998. ISBN 88-315-1682-5, ISBN 978-88-315-1682-2. [See, p. 299.].
- Michèle Cointet. L'Église sous Vichy. 1940-1945. La repentence en question. Librairie Académique Perrin, 1998. ISBN 2-262-01231-8. [See pages 240, 246, 261.].
- Collectif. L'affaire Finaly. Revue Archives Juives. Les Belles Lettres, 37/2, 2004. ISBN 978-2-251-69418-4
- Michael Curtis. Verdict on Vichy: Power and Prejudice in the Vichy France Regime. Arcade, 2002. ISBN 1-55970-689-9, ISBN 978-1-55970-689-6. [See, p. 338.].
- Anne Dulphy. Diplomatie et affaire Finaly: l'intermède espagnol. Archives juives 2004-2, volume 37, pp. 83–103. ISSN 0003-9837, ISBN 2-251-69418-8
- Norman Geras. Solidarity in the Conversation of Humankind: The Ungroundable Liberalism of Richard Rorty. Verso, 1995. ISBN 0-86091-453-4, ISBN 978-0-86091-453-2. [See, p. 27.].
- Anne Grynberg. Les camps de la honte. Les internés juifs des camps français (1939–1944). Avec une Postface inédite de l'auteur. La Découverte/Poche, Paris: 1999. ISBN 2-7071-3046-X. [See, p. 184, 366.].
- André Kaspi. Les Juifs pendant l'Occupation. Seuil: Paris, 1991. ISBN 2-02-013509-4. [See, p. 360.].
- Fabien Lacaf, Catherine Poujol. Les enfants cachés, l'affaire Finaly. Berg International Éditeurs, coll. IceBerg, 2007. ISBN 978-2-911289-93-4
- Germain Latour. Les deux orphelins, l'affaire Finaly 1945-1953, Fayard, 2006.
- Henri De Lubac. Résistance chrétienne à l'antisémitisme. Souvenirs 1940-1944. Fayard: Paris, 1988. ISBN 2-213-02125-2
- Michael Robert Marrus, Robert O. Paxton. Vichy France and the Jews. With a New Foreword by Stanley Hoffmann. Stanford University Press, 1995. ISBN 0-8047-2499-7, ISBN 978-0-8047-2499-9. [See, p. 207.].
- John Michalczyk. Resisters, Rescuers, and Refugees: Historical and Ethical Issues. Rowman & Littlefield, 1997. ISBN 1-55612-970-X, ISBN 978-1-55612-970-4. [See, p. 153.].
- Thomas Jay Oord. The Altruism Reader: Sélection from Writings on Love, Religion, and Science. Templeton Foundation Press, 2007. ISBN 1-59947-127-2, ISBN 978-1-59947-127-3. [See, p. 363.].
- Mordechai Paldiel. Churches and the Holocaust: Unholy Teaching, Good Samaritans, and Reconciliation. KTAV Publishing House, 2006. ISBN 0-88125-908-X, ISBN 978-0-88125-908-7. [See, p. 86.].
- Michael Phayer. The Catholic Church and the Holocaust, 1930-1965. Indiana University Press, 2000 ISBN 0-253-33725-9, ISBN 978-0-253-33725-2. [See, p. 127.].
- Catherine Poujol, avec la participation de Chantal Thoinet. Les enfants cachés, l'affaire Finaly (1945–1953). Berg International Éditeurs, 2006. ISBN 978-2-911289-86-6
- Germaine Anne Ribière. The Body and Language That Man Learns to Use. Impacts of Science on Society, 23, 1, 43–51, January/March 1973.
- Germaine Anne Ribière. Le peuple juif au présent. In: Rencontre Chrétiens et Juifs, Paris, 1984.
- Germaine Anne Ribière. Réflexions à propos du Carmel d'Auschwitz. In: Rencontre Chrétiens et Juifs, Paris, 1986, pp. 15–18.
- Germaine Ribière. In: Églises et chrétiens dans la Deuxième Guerre mondiale. La Région Rhône-Alpes. Actes du colloque de Grenoble. PUL: Lyon, 1978. [Quoted by Grynberg, 1999, p. 184, in a note].
- Germaine Ribière. L'affaire Finaly, ce que j'ai vécu. Centre de documentation juive contemporaine (CDJC), Paris, 1998. ASIN : B000WSOH8Q
- Germaine Ribière. Témoignage. Bulletin des Enfants Cachés, no 19, juin 1997, p. 8.
- Ruby Rohrlich. Resisting the Holocaust. Berg, 1998. ISBN 1-85973-216-X, ISBN 978-1-85973-216-8. [See, p. 7].
- Rita Thalmann. L'oubli des femmes dans l'historiographie de la Résistance , Clio, numéro 1-1995, Résistances et Libérations France 1940-1945.
- Margaret Collins Weitz. Sisters in the Resistance. How Women Fought to Free France, 1940-1945. John Wiley: New York, 1995. ISBN 0-471-12676-4. [See p. 182.].
- Limor Yagil. Chrétiens et Juifs sous Vichy (1940–1944): sauvetage et désobéissance civile. Éditions du Cerf, 2005. ISBN 2-204-07585-X, ISBN 978-2-204-07585-5. [See, p. 137.].
- Susan Zuccotti. The Holocaust, the French, and the Jews. U. of Nebraska Press, 1999. ISBN 0-8032-9914-1, ISBN 978-0-8032-9914-6. [See, p. 240.].
