= Joseph Voyame =

Swiss jurist (1923–2010)

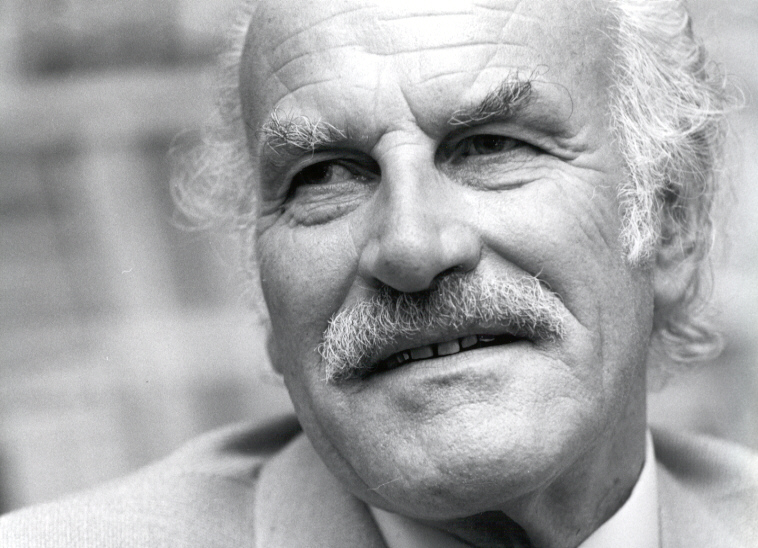
Joseph Voyame

Joseph Voyame (1923–2010) was a Swiss jurist.

== Education ==
Voyame received an undergraduate law degree in Bern in 1944, and passed his lawyer certification in 1947.

== Career ==
He was the clerk of the Supreme Court of the Canton of Bern (1947–1952) and the Federal Court (1953–1962). From 1962 he worked in intellectual property at a national level, and was made the deputy director of the World Intellectual Property Organization in 1969. From 1974 Voyame was the director of the Swiss Federal Office of Justice.

He held positions at the University of Bern (1964–1970), the University of Lausanne (1970–1988), and the Swiss Graduate School of Public Administration. After retirement, he served as an expert on national and international committees, including as chair of the United Nations Committee Against Torture.

== Awards ==
Voyame received the Medal of Honor from the Council of Europe in 1987 and was awarded honorary doctorates from the University of Neuchâtel (1988) and the University of Bern (1994).
