= Albert Schinz =

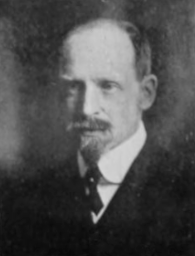
- Born: 1870; Neuchâtel, Switzerland
- Died: December 19, 1943 (aged 73); Iowa City, Iowa, US
- Education: University of Neuchâtel
- Occupation: Academic

Albert Schinz (March 9, 1870 – December 19, 1943) was an American French and philosophical scholar, editor, and professor of French literature. Born in Neuchâtel, Switzerland, Schinz died in the United States at an Iowa State University Hospital, in Iowa City, of pneumonia.

== Education and career ==
Albert graduated from the University of Neuchâtel (1888–1892), and studied at Berlin, Tübingen (Ph.D., 1894), Sorbonne and Collège de France (1894), and in the United States at Clark University. He taught at the University of Minnesota for one year, then became professor of French literature at Clark University (1897–1898), University of Minnesota (1898–1899), Bryn Mawr College (1899- ), and at Smith College in Northampton, Massachusetts (1913–1928). He finally retired after teaching French at the University of Pennsylvania in 1941. He spent the rest of his time as a visiting professor at Indiana, Texas, and Iowa University. He was a guest editor for an issue of the Modern Language Journal.

== Works ==
=== Books ===
- Anti-Pragmatism: An Examination into the Respective Rights of Intellectual Aristocracy and Social Democracy (1909), Boston: Small, Maynard and Company
- J. J. Rousseau: A Forerunner of Pragmatism (1909), Chicago, Open Court Pub. Co.; London, Kegan Paul, Trench, Trübner & Co.
- Les accent dans l'ecriture française (1912), Paris : H. Champion
- La question du "Contrat Social" (1913), Paris: A. Colin
- French Literature of the Great War (1920)
- Seventeenth Century French Readings (1915), New York: H. Holt, with Helen Maxwell King
- Eighteenth Century French Readings (1923)
- Nineteenth Century French Readings (1939)

=== Articles and journals ===
- "L'art dans les Contes devots de Gautier de Coinci"

Schinz was published in The Nation as a contributor of an article in 1918, Issue 107 and was critically reviewed in an article for his book French Literature of the Great War.

His book J. J. Rousseau: A Forerunner of Pragmatism was also reviewed in the Modern Language Quarterly.

== See also ==
- Pragmatism
- J. J. Rousseau
- the Great War
