= Fernand Brunner =

Swiss philosopher (1920–1991)

Fernand Brunner (8 October 1920 – 1 November 1991) was a Swiss philosopher. After studying in Lausanne and in Paris, he was a professor at the University of Neuchâtel.

He united philosophical introspection with the study of the history of philosophy in a personalized manner. He was interested in ancient history, the Middle Ages, the modern era, traditional Arab and Jewish philosophies, as well as ideas from India, studying the differences between philosophy and tradition. Among Western traditions, he was particularly interested in the platonic and neoplatonic traditions, in Meister Eckhart, Solomon Ibn Gabirol, and Leibniz.

He defended the idea that philosophy was linked to wisdom, and that the history of philosophy was strictly linked to philosophy itself. In his work about science and reality, he criticized the foundations of modern science, which he countered with the importance of philosophy.

== Works ==
- Études sur la signification historique de la philosophie de Leibniz, Vrin, Paris, 1950
- Ibn Gabirol, La source de vie, livre III, trad., Vrin, Paris, 1950
- Science et réalité, Aubier, Paris, 1954
- Platonisme et aristotélisme; La critique d'Ibn Gabirol par Saint Thomas d'Aquin, Nauwelaerts, Louvain, Paris, 1965
- Maître Eckhart, Seghers, Paris, 1969
- Introduction à la philosophie, Éditions du Grand Midi, Zurich, 1995
