= Frédéric Guillaume de Pury =

Swiss-Australian winemaker and public official

Consul Frédéric Guillaume de Pury
- de Pury in the 1880s

Swiss Honorary Consul to Australia

Baron
- In office 1875–1890
- Preceded by: Samuel Rentsch
- Succeeded by: Charles Martin

Personal details
- Born: 15 December 1831 Neuchâtel, Switzerland
- Died: 11 November 1890 (aged 58) Lausanne, Switzerland
- Spouse: Adelaide Augusta Ibbotson
- Relations: De Pury family
- Children: 2
- Parent(s): Baron Edouard Charles Alexandre de Pury; Julie de Sandoz-Travers
- Occupation: winemaker, statesman, diplomat

Baron Frédéric Guillaume de Pury (15 December 1831 – 11 November 1890) was a Swiss Australian winemaker, farmer, statesman, and diplomat who served as the Swiss Honorary Consul to Australia in Melbourne from 1875 to 1890 (his death) as well as justice of peace. De Pury owned several vineyards in Australia (Yering) and exported his vines to England, France, and other European countries. He was the founder of the Australian branch of the De Pury family.

== Biography ==
De Pury was born on 15 December 1831 in Neuchâtel to Baron Edouard Charles Alexandre de Pury, a member of the Grand Council of Neuchâtel, and his second wife, Julie de Sandoz-Travers. His family had been ennobled by Frederick II of Prussia. De Pury was the granduncle of Roland de Pury.

In 1851 he moved to England to study English and agriculture. On 6 May 1852, de Pury left England for Victoria, Australia. He first worked tending cattle on a property in Yering that was owned by Paul de Castella. In 1855 he and Hubert de Castella purchased Dalry, a former out-station of Yering. They were joined in business by de Pury's brother, Samuel, who had recently arrived from Switzerland. In 1858 he sold Dalry and rented land near Darlot Creek to graze sheep and breed horses. In 1860 de Pury purchased land near Lilydale and named it Cooring Yering, planting a vineyard and building a house and wine cellar there. In 1863, along with George Langdon, he purchased nine-hundred acres in Yering from de Castella's creditors, which he named Yeringberg, starting a vineyard there. In 1869 he bought out Langdon. Yerinberg was later enlarged to 1,160 acres and produced over 90,922 litres of wine annually. The wine was exported to Europe.

De Pury was a leader of the Swiss community in Lilydale. He became a justice of the peace in 1862 and was a member of the Upper Yarra District Roads Board for twenty-one years. When the Shire of Lillydale was established in 1872, he served as one of its first councilors and later as its president. From 1875 to 1890 he served as an honorary consul for the Swiss Confederation in Melbourne.

A devout Protestant, de Pury supported the construction of an Anglican church in Lilydale. He had an interest in Aboriginal Australians and was an adviser of William Barak. In 1881 he served on a government inquiry into the condition of the Aboriginal station at Coranderrk.

== Personal life ==
On 2 February 1869 he married Adelaide Augusta Ibbotson at St James Cathedral. They had two sons;

- George Alphonse de Pury (1 January 1870 – 14 September 1956)
- Montague Edouard de Pury (20 March 1873 – July 1960)

He was appointed as a commissioner of the International Exhibition in Melbourne. He died on 11 November 1890 in Lausanne, Switzerland.
