= David de Pury (diplomat) =

Swiss businessman and diplomat

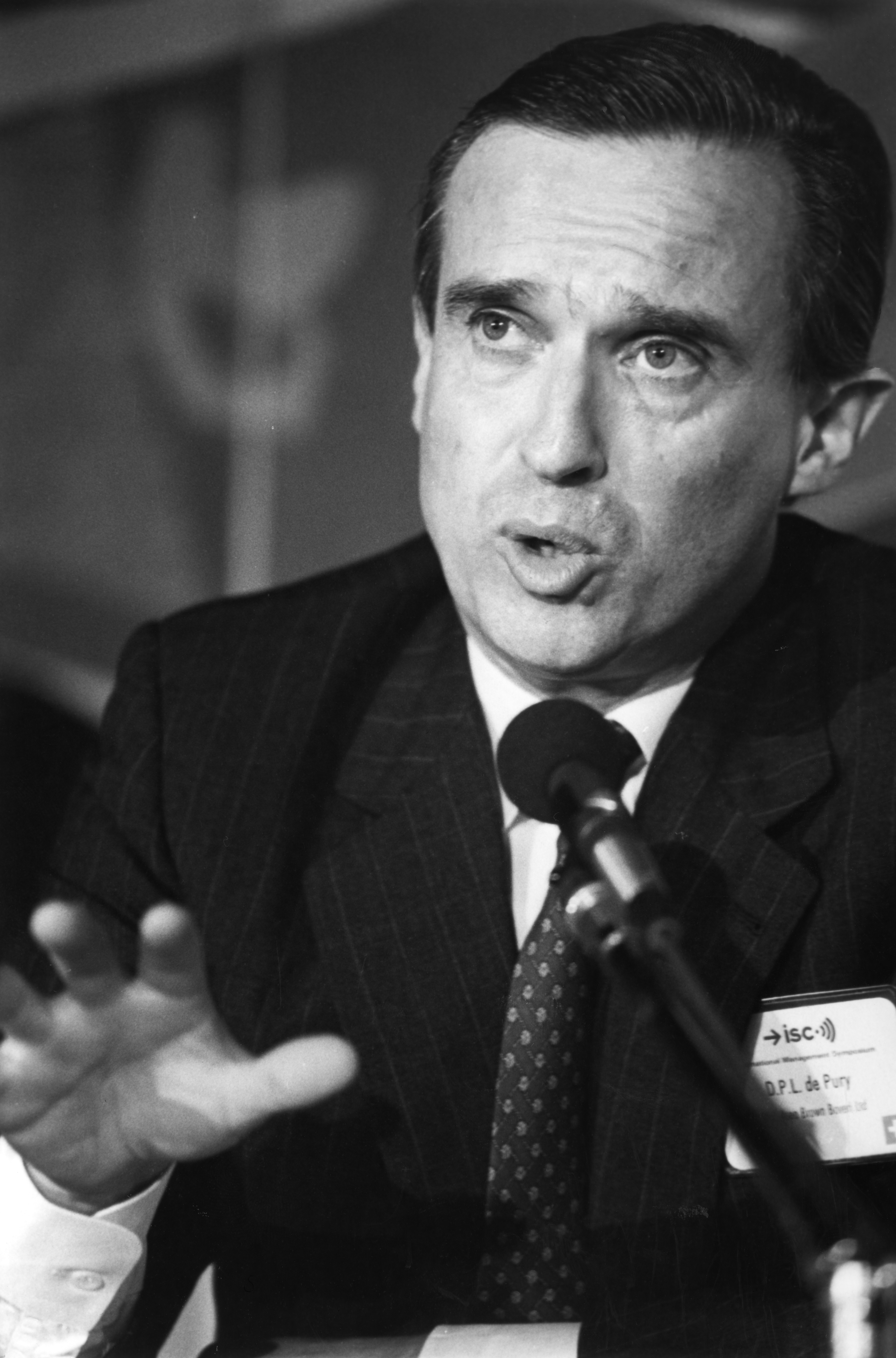
- De Pury in 1995
- Born: Patrice Lancelot David de Pury; 4 December 1943; Bern, Switzerland
- Died: 26 December 2000 (aged 57); Zürich, Switzerland
- Occupations: Businessman, diplomat, lawyer
- Spouse: Maria Eugenia Echeverria
- Children: 2
- Relatives: Simon de Pury (brother); Albert Riggenbach (great-grandfather)
- Family: De Pury family

Baron Patrice Lancelot "David" de Pury colloquially David de Pury (4 December 1943 – 27 December 2000) was a Swiss businessman and diplomat. He was the Swiss trade ambassador, representing Swiss interests at the General Agreement on Tariffs & Trade and at the Inter-American Development Bank. He was the chair of ABB, and chair and publisher of Le Temps.

== Early life and education ==
De Pury was born 4 December 1943 into nobility in Bern, Switzerland to Jean-Jacques de Pury (1911-1998), an attorney and president of Nippon Roche, the subsidiary of Roche in Japan, and Marguerite (née Miescher; 1916-2007), an expert for Ikebana.

His paternal family that has been nobilitated in 1651 by Henri II. d'Orléans, Duke of Longueville and had their origins in Neuchatel. One of his brothers is Simon de Pury, auctioneer and former owner of Philips. His niece is Loyse de Pury, an actress and arts representative. On his maternal side he is of Bernese descent with his grandfather, H. Leonard Miescher-Riggenbach, being associated with the textile industry (Viscose Suisse and Steckborn Kunstseide). His great-grandfather was Albert Riggenbach.

De Pury studied Law at the University of Geneva graduating with a Licentiate degree.

== Career ==
De Pury was a delegate of the Federal Council for Trade Agreements in Switzerland and served as Switzerland's Trade Ambassador, and representing the country at the General Agreement on Tariffs & Trade in 1987. De Pury succeeded Fritz Leutwiler as the Co-Chairman of ABB, serving in that capacity from 1992 to 1996. He later served as the Chairman of BBC Brown Boveri. He held a number of government offices, including working in the Federal Department of Foreign Affairs in Bern. He represented Switzerland in The Hague, Brussels and Washington DC. In the 1980s he served as the Governor for Switzerland at the Inter-American Development Bank. He was a board member of Nestlé, Ciba-Geigy and Zurich Insurance Group and chairman and publisher of Le Temps. In 1996 he co-founded the wealth management firm de Pury, Pictet, Turrettini.

De Pury was Vice President of the Lucerne Classical Music Festival. In 1995 he called for a liberalization of the Swiss economy and was criticized for trying to "dismantle" the welfare state. In April 1993 he spoke to university students at the Harvard Kennedy School about governmental and commercial issues. He was chosen to speak at the school due to his active role in the annual International Management Symposium in St Gallen, Switzerland.

== Personal life ==
De Pury married Maria Eugenia Echeverria, a native of Peru, former Ambassador of Peru to Romania. As of January 2025, she serves as Ambassador Extraordinary and Plenipotentiary of Peru to Austria and as the country’s Permanent Representative to the United Nations Office at Vienna (UNOV), the International Atomic Energy Agency (IAEA), the United Nations Industrial Development Organization (UNIDO), and the Comprehensive Nuclear-Test-Ban Treaty Organization (CTBTO).

They had two children.

- Miguel Alonso de Pury (born 1998)
- Beatriz Marguerite Lydia de Pury (born 2000)

He died from pancreatic cancer on 27 December 2000 at a hospital in Zürich.
