= Roland de Pury =

Swiss Protestant clergyman

- Born: 15 November 1907; Geneva, Switzerland
- Died: 24 January 1979; Aix-en-Provence, France
- Occupation(s): theologian, pastor, writer
- Known for: Righteous Among the Nations
- Spouse: Jacqueline de Montmollin
- Children: 8
- Parent(s): Baron Jules de Pury; Noémi Perrot

Baron Roland de Pury (15 November 1907 – 24 January 1979) was a Swiss Protestant theologian, pastor, and writer. Living in France during World War II, he was a staunch opponent of Nazism and the Holocaust and publicly criticized and preached against the Vichy French government and German occupation of France. De Pury joined the French Resistance and organized an escape route for Jewish refugees to leave France and enter Switzerland, hiding them in his home before helping them to the French-Swiss border. He collaborated with French Catholic leaders, including Pierre Chaillet, to rescue Jews. His operation was discovered by the Gestapo, leading to his arrest and imprisonment at Montluc prison. De Pury and his wife were honored as Righteous Among the Nations by Yad Vashem for their efforts to save Jews during the Holocaust. After the war ended, de Pury worked as a missionary in Africa, where he opposed French colonial rule and denounced torture and other violent practices used during the Algerian War.

== Early life, education, and ministry ==
De Pury was born on 15 November 1907 in Geneva, the only child of Baron Jules de Pury, a military officer, and Noémi Perrot, a relative of the de Pourtalès family. He belonged to a Huguenot family from the Principality of Neuchâtel that had been ennobled by Frederick II of Prussia in 1785. His grandfather, Baron Édouard François de Pury, served as the President of the Neuchâtel Town Council. He was a grandnephew of Baron Frédéric Guillaume de Pury. De Pury studied literature at the University of Neuchâtel with the intention of becoming a writer. With Denis de Rougemont, Henry Corbin, Albert-Marie Schmidt, and Roger Breuil, he co-founded the Christian existentialist magazine Hic et Nunc. He later moved to Bonn and studied Reformed Protestant theology, becoming a student and follower of Karl Barth in 1932. Upon completing his theological studies, he moved to France and took up a post as a pastor at a Reformed parish church in Vendée.

De Pury married Jacqueline de Montmollin, a Swiss noblewoman and distant relative of his, on 27 March 1931. They had eight children. In 1937 de Pury moved to Lyon and worked as a minister at the Protestant Temple of Terreaux on Rue Lanterne in the 1st arrondissement. He and his family lived in La Croix-Rousse.

== World War II ==
In 1940, during German occupation of France, he led a spiritual resistance movement against Nazism and helped Jews, who were being persecuted during the Holocaust, leave France for Switzerland. On 14 July 1940 he preached against Nazism, Marshal Philippe Pétain, and the collaboration of Vichy France with Nazi Germany in a sermon titled You Will Not Steal. In 1941 he was one of the signatories of the Theses of Pomeyrol, a declaration of spiritual resistance in France. In November 1941 he and his wife, Jacqueline, collaborated with Françoise Seligmann, a social worker who had recently joined Combat, to create a chain of escape to Switzerland, passing through Archamps. They hid Jews in their home before assisting them to the French-Swiss border. De Pury also collaborated with Germaine Ribière and Father Pierre Chaillet, a Jesuit priest and head of the rescue organization Amitiés Chrétiennes, to facilitate full cooperation among Catholics and Protestants to rescue Jews. The Œuvre de secours aux enfants connected de Pury with Paulette Mercier, a French pharmacist and member of the resistance movement, who contacted Ruth Jaccard Monney and her parents, Arthur and Whilhelmine Jaccard, as well as the Dupeyreix family in Switzerland, to establish a network of resistance members across the border. Through the network, de Pury, the Jaccards, and the Dupeyreix were able to hide Jewish women and girls at a Catholic estate in Labalme, between Lyon and Geneva, and use the estate as a transit point to Switzerland.

After German forces occupied the Zone libre in November 1942, and the Gestapo was installed in Lyon, German officials discovered du Pury's operation to help Jewish refugees escape to Switzerland. On 13 May 1943, while presiding over a church service, de Pury was arrested by the Gestapo and was detained for several months at Montluc prison, despite the petitions made by Cardinal-Archbishop Pierre-Marie Gerlier and Marc Boegner. While he was imprisoned at Montluc, he authored the book Cell Diary. He was transferred to Bregenz in Austria, where he was turned over to local authorities and released in an exchange for German spies who had been arrested in Switzerland at the end of October 1943. After his release, he took refuge in Neuchâtel, his ancestral home, with his family, and then returned to Lyon.

== Post-war life ==
After the war, de Pury focused on writing. He authored the books What is Protestantism?, Your God Reigns, and Letters from Europe: A Young Intellectual in the Interwar Years. From 1957 to the 1970s, he worked as a missionary for the Paris Evangelical Missionary Society, serving in Cameroon and Madagascar. He protested against colonial rule in French Algeria and denounced torture practices used during the Algerian War. He also preached against the cultural practice of exchanging a bride price before marriage, which he witnessed in Cameroon. After his work in Africa, he visited Russia and became a critic of Communism. He moved back Southern France and became a university chaplain and led a reformed congregation in Aix-en-Provence.

In 1976 Yad Vashem bestowed de Pury and his wife with the honor of Righteous Among the Nations for their work helping Jewish refugees during the Holocaust.

He died on 24 January 1979 in Aix-en-Provence.
