= Simon de Pury =

Swiss art collector

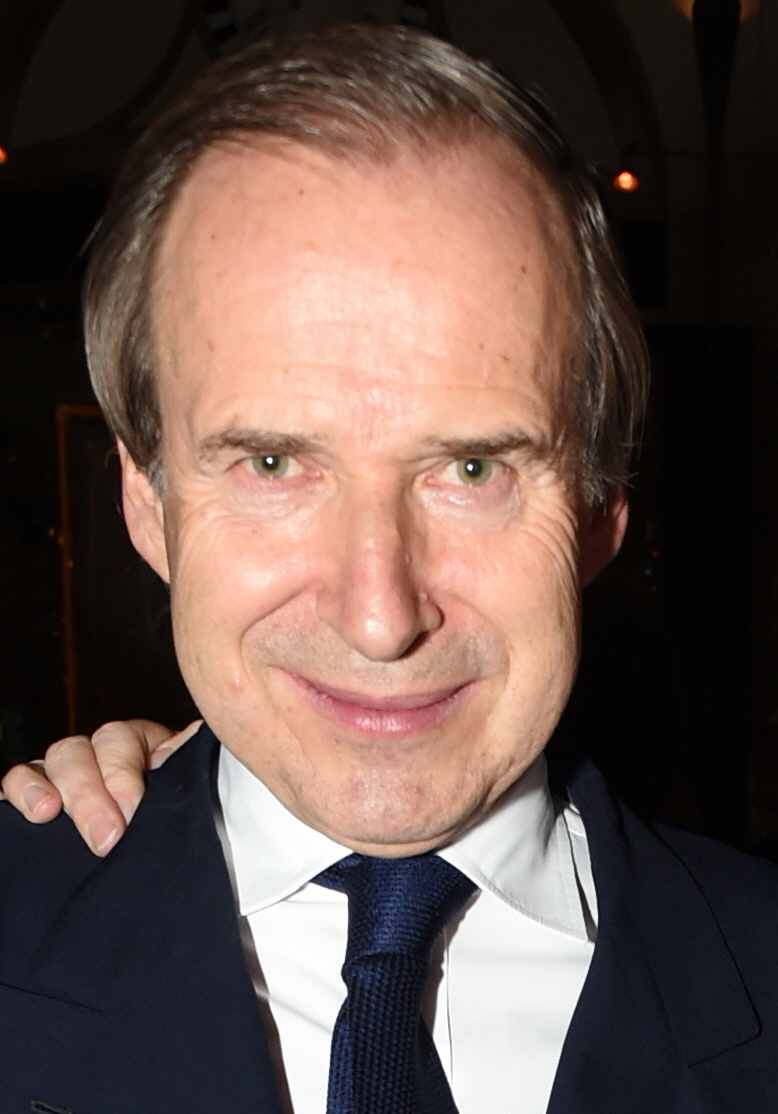
- De Pury in 2014
- Born: Abram Simon Léonor Christian de Pury; 21 November 1951 (age 74); Basel, Switzerland
- Education: Tokyo University of the Arts
- Occupations: Auctioneer and art dealer
- Spouses: Isabel Sloman (m. 1977; div. 2001) Michaela Neumeister (m. 2009; div. 2019)
- Children: 5
- Relatives: Albert Riggenbach (great-grandfather)
- Website: de-pury.com

Abram Simon Léonor Christian de Pury colloquially Simon de Pury (born 21 November 1951) is a Swiss auctioneer, art dealer, curator, collector, DJ, and photographer. In 2002, he acquired the majority control of the auction house Phillips. He has appeared in several television programs and films, including the Bravo network reality series Work of Art: The Next Great Artist. His book The Auctioneer: Adventures in the Art Trade was published in 2016.

== Early life and education ==
De Pury was born 21 November 1951 into a Swiss noble family in Basel, Switzerland to Jean-Jacques de Pury (1911-1998), an attorney and president of Nippon Roche, the subsidiary of Roche in Japan, and Marguerite (née Miescher; 1916-2007), an expert for Ikebana. His older brother, David de Pury (1943-2000) was a former president of ABB and diplomat.

His paternal family that has been nobilitated in 1651 by Henri II. d'Orléans, Duke of Longueville and had their origins in Neuchatel. On his maternal side he is of Bernese descent with his grandfather, H. Leonard Miescher-Riggenbach, being associated with the textile industry (Viscose Suisse and Steckborn Kunstseide). His great-grandfather was Albert Riggenbach.

He studied at the Tokyo University of the Arts in the 1970s.

== Art career ==
De Pury began his art career in the early 1970s when he studied Japanese painting techniques at the Tokyo University of the Arts. He hoped to become an artist but could not get a foothold at New York City galleries. He began his auctioning career in Switzerland working for the Swiss auction house Kornfeld and Klipstein in Bern.

After studying at the Sotheby's Institute, de Pury began working for the Sotheby's auction house in 1974 at their London and Monte Carlo offices, and later opened their Geneva branch in his native Switzerland. From 1979 to 1986 he was the curator of the Thyssen-Bornemisza Collection and organized numerous art exhibitions at the Villa Favorita in Lugano, Switzerland. In 1986, he was appointed chairman of Sotheby's Switzerland, and later chairman of Sotheby's Europe and chief auctioneer worldwide.

In 1997, de Pury left Sotheby's to start an art advisory company and dealership with Daniella Luxembourg, called de Pury and Luxembourg Art. In 2001 the company merged with Philips Auctioneers, which was named Phillips, de Pury & Luxembourg (from 2001 to 2002) and then Phillips de Pury & Company (from 2003 to 2012), of which he was chairman and chief auctioneer. In October 2008 a majority stake in the company was sold to the Russian retailer The Mercury Group and de Pury sold his remaining stake in the company at the end of 2012. In 2013 the company name reverted to being Phillips.

In 2013 de Pury founded de Pury de Pury, a private advisory and art consultancy, with his then-wife. During this time Simon de Pury curated and organised several exhibitions with artists including Erik Bulatov, Mario Testino, Mary McCartney, and Wojciech Fangor.

== Philanthropy ==
As an active charity auctioneer, it is estimated that de Pury has helped raise several billion dollars for a number of charities and cultural institutions over the course of his career including amfAR, Elton John AIDS Foundation, Leonardo DiCaprio Foundation, MTV Staying Alive and the Prince Albert II of Monaco Foundation, among others.

== Film and television appearances ==
De Pury has appeared in numerous films and television programs, usually playing himself. His first film appearance was in the 2006 French film Avenue Montaigne, where he had a small role playing a famous art collector. In March 2010 he was the subject of an hour-long documentary on BBC Four titled "The Man with the Golden Gavel." He also appeared in the Oscar-nominated documentary Waste Land, which chronicled an art project by the renowned Brazilian artist Vik Muniz. De Pury appears towards the end of the film as the auctioneer that sells the final photographs. In 2013, de Pury was the subject of an hour-long documentary Der Auktionator, on Arte, the European culture TV channel.

De Pury is perhaps best known to the general public for his recurring role on the Bravo network reality television series Work of Art: The Next Great Artist. He appears in every episode of the show as a mentor to all of the artists in the competition, offering advice, encouragement and sometimes very blunt criticism. He has also made guest appearances in three episodes of The Colbert Report as himself.

De Pury also appears in "Playtime" by British video artist Isaac Julien. The work premiered in November 2013 at Metro Pictures gallery in New York City.

De Pury makes a cameo appearance in Darren Star's comedy-drama series, ‘Emily in Paris’, released on Netflix in October 2020. De Pury plays himself, at a fictional auction to benefit the American Friends of the Louvre, in a precursor to real life events: in November 2020 de Pury and Star were both part of the line-up at an online auction organised by the actual American Friends of the Louvre.

In 1991, de Pury was the testimonial for an advertising campaign of the Swiss airline Swissair, which has since gone bankrupt. He promoted the then new Business Class of the Swissair B-747.

== Books ==
De Pury published The Auctioneer: Adventures in the Art Trade, written with William Stadiem, in 2016 with St. Martin's Press. The book was published in English, French, Spanish and Mandarin.

== Personal life ==
He has been known to conduct auctions in English, French, German, Italian and occasionally Russian.

His private art collection includes works by Richard Prince, Alex Israel and Christopher Wool, but also contains an eclectic assortment of items such as coffee mugs shaped liked cartoon characters, skateboards and Godzilla figurines.
