= Jerzy Kostrowicki =

Polish geographer (1918–2002)

Prof. Jerzy Kostrowicki
- Born: January 27, 1918; Kościeniewo
- Died: July 11, 2002 (aged 84); Warsaw
- Resting place: Powązki Cemetery in Warsaw

Jerzy Samuel Kostrowicki (1918–2002) was a Polish geographer specializing in economic geography.

He was born on 27 January 1918 in Kościeniewo near Lida (now Shchuchyn District, Belarus). He graduated from economy at the Warsaw School of Economics, and from geography at the University of Warsaw. He conducted research on the roles of towns, activation of underdeveloped regions, land use, as well as the spatial structure and typology of agriculture. Kostrowicki became a professor at the Institute of Geography and Spatial Organization of the Polish Academy of Sciences in 1954 and a member of the Academy in 1973. From 1976 until 1980, he was the deputy president of the International Geographical Union, where he also served as the head of the Commission on Agricultural Typology and the permanent representative to the Food and Agriculture Organization. Kostrowicki died on 11 July 2002 in Warsaw.

Kostrowicki was buried at Powązki Cemetery in Warsaw.
