= Albert de Pury =

Swiss biblical scholar (1940–2025)

Baron Albert de Pury (22 December 1940 – 5 June 2025) was a Swiss biblical scholar, historian and exegete. A specialist in biblical history, and the literary and religious traditions of the ancient Ancient Near East, he served on the faculty at the University of Geneva and the University of Neuchâtel as a professor of the Old Testament.

== Early life and education ==
De Pury was a member of a Huguenot family from Neuchâtel that was ennobled by Frederick II of Prussia in 1785. He studied theology at the University of Basel and the University of Neuchâtel before enrolling at the École Biblique in Jerusalem.

== Career ==
From 1966 to 1972, de Pury served on the faculty at the University of Neuchâtel's theology department as a professor of Biblical Hebrew. In 1975 he published his doctorate on the biblical figure Jacob. He taught classes on the Old Testament from 1972 to 1984. In 1984 he joined the faculty at the University of Geneva. He taught at Geneva for thirty years and served as Dean of Theology for two years.

His academic research focused on Biblical patriarchs, the Pentateuch, the Book of Judges, the Biblical canon, and the Ketuvim. At the University of Geneva, de Pury initiated the project The Pentateuque, which focused on the literary origins of the Hebrew Bible. He published the articles El Olam, El-Roï, and Lahaï-Roï.

De Pury was also a cartoonist and published three cartoons, Hello! in 1992, Big Bang in 1994, and Oh, Sorry! And Other Biblical Exclamations in 2007.

De Pury served as the head of the center for Ancient Near East Studies. He was a member of the Swiss Academy of Humanities and Social Sciences and the Racines et Sources Foundation.

He was awarded honorary doctorates from the University of Zurich and Károli-Gáspár University, Budapest.

== Death ==
De Pury died on 5 June 2025, at the age of 84.
