= James-Ferdinand de Pury =

Swiss businessman and philanthropist

- Born: 1823; Neuchâtel, Switzerland
- Died: 15 May 1902 (aged 78–79); Neuchâtel, Switzerland
- Occupations: businessman, philanthropist
- Spouse: Augustine-Marie Bevilaqua
- Children: 1
- Parent(s): Baron Charles Auguste de Pury; Countess Sophie Marianne de Pourtalès

Baron James-Ferdinand de Pury (1823 – 15 May 1902) was a Swiss businessman and philanthropist. He amassed a large fortune through his business in the Brazilian tobacco trade, and was knighted by Pedro II of Brazil. His villa in Neuchâtel now houses the Musée d'ethnographie de Neuchâtel.

== Biography ==
De Pury was born in 1823 in Neuchâtel, the fourth child of Baron Charles Auguste de Pury, the mayor of La Côte, and Countess Sophie Marianne de Pourtalès, a member of a French-Swiss noble family. His great-grandfather, Abraham Bernard, was a childhood friend and relative of Jean-Jacques Rousseau. While a relative of the philanthropist David de Pury, he was not a descendant of the same family line.

In 1846, when he was twenty-three years old, de Pury moved to Bahia, Brazil to work for a tobacco company owned by his uncle, Auguste de Meuron. He was successful in the tobacco business and amassed a fortune. He was made a knight of the Order of the Rose by Pedro II of Brazil for his contributions to the tobacco trade.

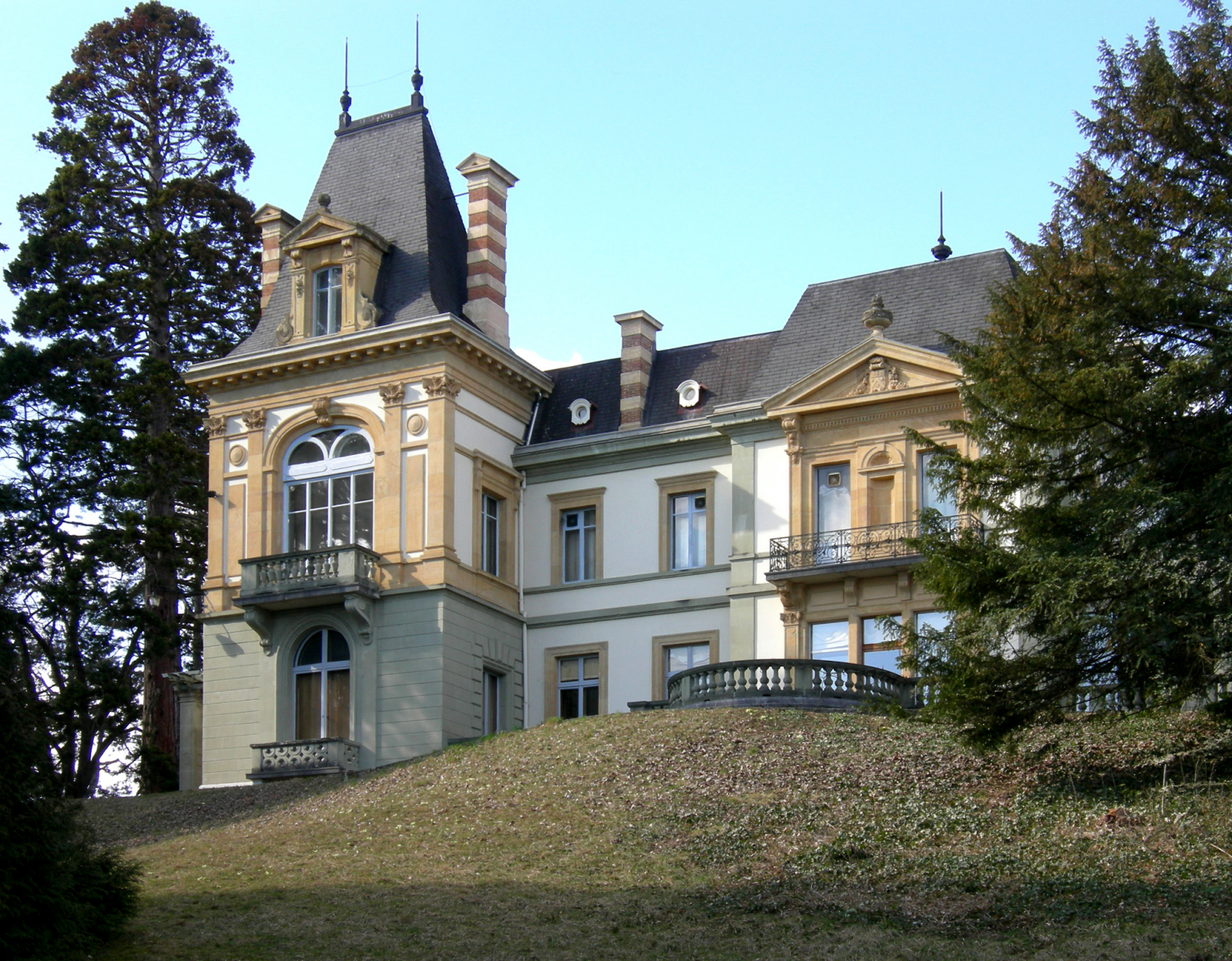
De Pury's villa in Neuchâtel

In 1863 he married Augustine-Marie Bevilaqua, a Brazilian woman who was twenty years his junior. They had one daughter, Mathilde, who was born in 1868. The family later moved back to Switzerland. In 1872, de Pury had a grand villa built on the Hill of St-Nicolas in Neuchâtel, designed by the architect Léo Châtelain. He retired from business in 1879, dedicating his time to philanthropic causes and hosting society functions. De Pury provided the local art museum with several paintings for their collection and left a carved ivory piece made by the Vili people to the ethnography museum.

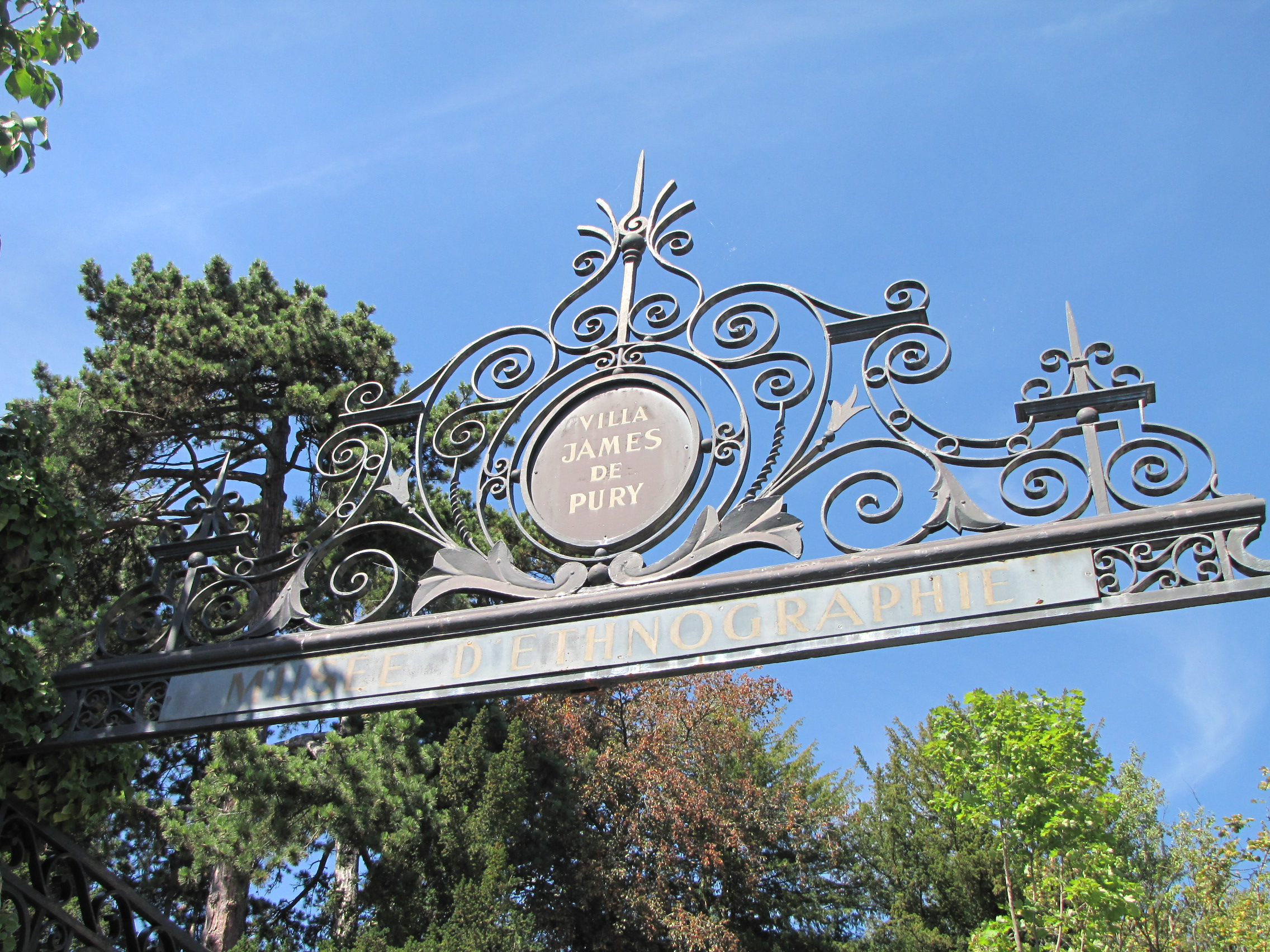
entrance to the Villa James de Pury

De Pury's daughter died in 1882 and his wife died in 1900. He died on 15 May 1902. Left without an heir, he bequeathed his villa to the city of Neuchâtel so that it could be made into a museum. The house, known as the Villa James de Pury, now houses the Musée d'ethnographie de Neuchâtel. The entrance of the museum contains a plaque commemorating de Pury.
