= Mellish =

Mellish is a surname. Notable people with the surname include:

- Arthur Preston Mellish (1905–1930), Canadian mathematician
- Bart Mellish (born 1983), Australian politician and Labor Party member of the Queensland Legislative Assembly
- Bertrand Evelyn Mellish Gurdon (1867–1949), a British soldier and administrator
- Bob Mellish, Baron Mellish (1913–1998), British Labour politician and Member of Parliament
- Charles Mellish (1737–1797), British Member of Parliament
- David B. Mellish (1831–1874), American politician
- Edith Mellish (1861–1922), New Zealand Anglican deaconess and nun
- Edward Mellish (priest), an Anglican priest in the late 18th and early 19th centuries
- Frank Mellish (1897–1965), rugby player for England and South Africa
- Fuller Mellish (1865–1936), born Harold Arthur Fuller, an English born American stage and screen actor
- George Mellish (1814–1877), British judge
- Henry Mellish (1856–1927), English meteorologist
- John E. Mellish (1886–1970), American amateur astronomer
- Jon Mellish (born 1997), English footballer for clubs including Carlisle United and Wigan Athletic
- Joseph Mellish (c.1717–1790), British Member of Parliament
- Mary Mellish (educator) (1849–1901), Canadian educator
- Mary Mellish (soprano) (1890–1955), American soprano
- Morgan Mellish (1970–2007), Australian journalist
- Noel Mellish (1880–1962), English Victoria Cross recipient
- Page Mellish, founder of Feminists Fighting Pornography
- Shaun Mellish (born 1970), English former professional snooker player
- Stuart Mellish (born 1969), English former footballer who played as a midfielder
- Thomas Mellish (1773–1837), English cricketer
- Vivienne (photographer), full name Florence Vivienne Mellish (1889–1982), British photographer and singer
- William Mellish (died 1791) (c. 1710–1791), British government administrator and Member of Parliament
- William Mellish (victualler) (c. 1763–1834), English businessman
- William Mellish (banker) (c. 1764–1838), English politician, banker and Governor of the Bank of England, son of the above
- William Mellish (cricketer) (1810–1864)

Fictional characters:

- Fielding Mellish, protagonist of the 1971 film Bananas, played by Woody Allen

== See also ==
- Mellish's comet (actually four such comets)
  - 1907e, 1907 V, C/1907 T1
  - 1915a, 1915 II, C/1915 C1
  - 1915d, 1915 IV, C/1915 R1
  - 1917a, 1917 I, D/1917 F1, D/Mellish 1
- Melis, a surname and given name
- Mellis (disambiguation)
