= Comet Mellish =

Comet Mellish, or Mellish's Comet, may refer to any of the four comets discovered by American astronomer, John E. Mellish, below:

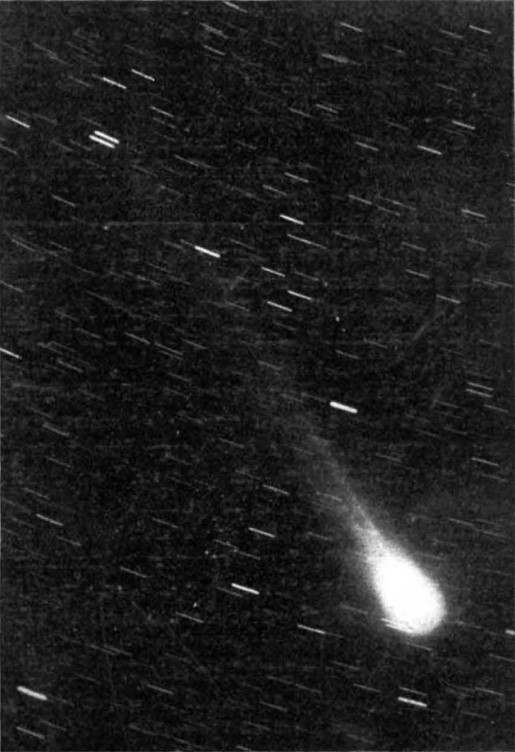
C/1915 C1 (Mellish)

- C/1907 T1 (Mellish)
- C/1915 C1 (Mellish)
- C/1915 R1 (Mellish)
- C/1917 F1 (Mellish)

It may also be a partial reference to several comets he co-discovered with other astronomers:

- C/1907 G1 (Grigg–Mellish)
