= Comet Grigg =

Comet Grigg may refer to any of the three comets discovered by John Grigg below:

- 26P/Grigg–Skjellerup
- C/1903 H1 (Grigg)
- C/1907 G1 (Grigg–Mellish)
