= Meli =

Meli or MELI may refer to:

== People with the surname ==
- Angelo Meli (1897–1969), American mobster
- Francis Meli (born 1979), New Zealand rugby league player
- Giovanni Meli (1740–1815), Italian poet
- Mangi Meli, Tanzanian royalty
- Silvio Meli (born 1954), Maltese judge

== People with the given name ==
- Meli Bogileka, Fijian politician

== Other uses ==
- Methyllithium, organolithium compound
- Amomyrtus meli, a species of tree
- Meli Park, a former theme park in Belgium
- Mercado Libre, Argentine e-commerce company (stock symbol MELI)

== See also ==
- Melih, a Turkish given name
- Melis, a surname and given name
- Mellis (disambiguation)
