= Gérard DeVisme =

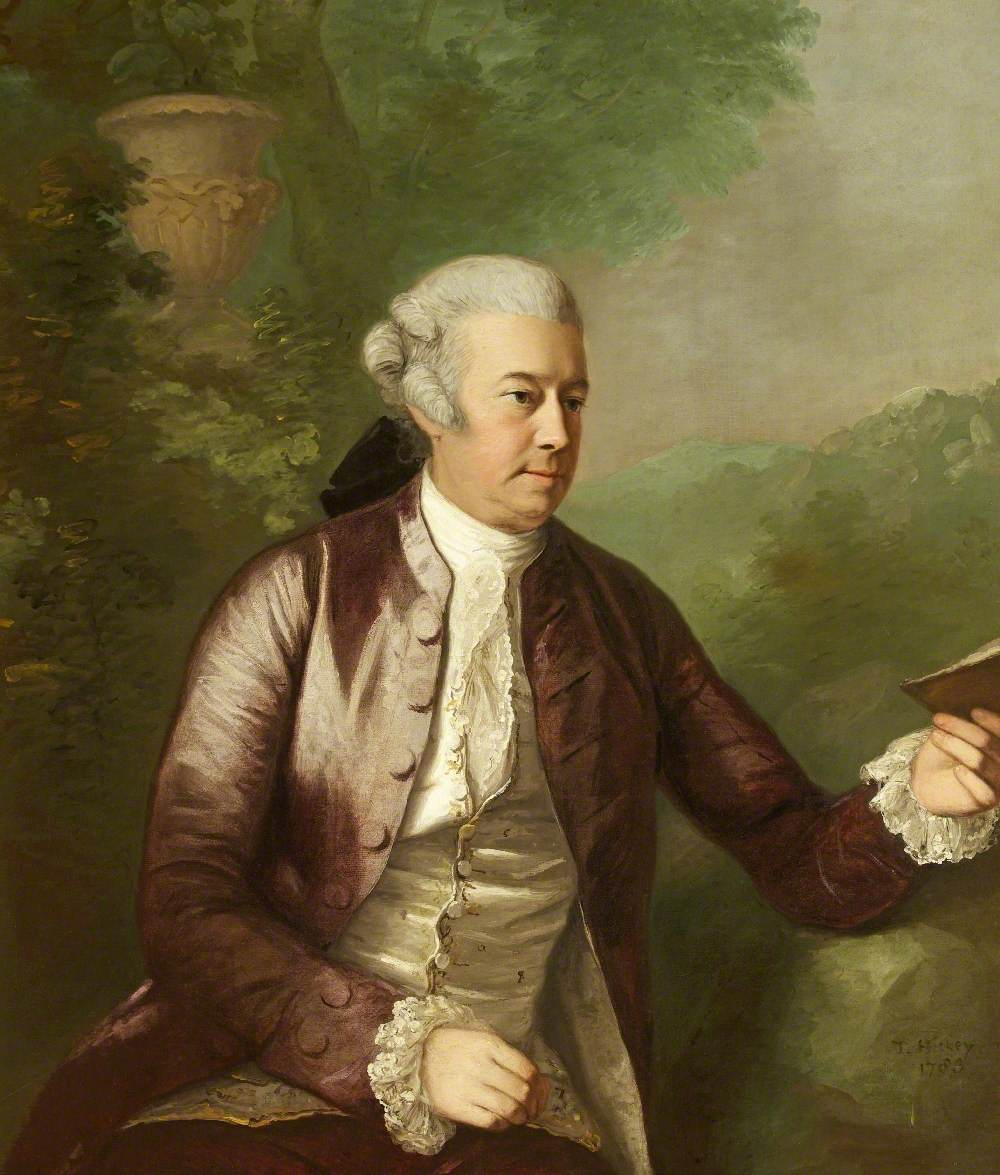
1783 portrait of DeVisme by Thomas Hickey

Gérard DeVisme (6 February 1726 – 20 November 1797) was a British merchant, banker and landowner. Active for much of his life in Lisbon, he played a major role in Anglo-Portuguese trade and finance and was extensively involved in the triangular trade. DeVisme was also known for developing the estate of Monserrate in Sintra.

== Life ==
Gérard DeVisme was born in London on 6 February 1726. He was the fifth son of Philippe de Visme, a Huguenot nobleman from Picardy, and Marianne de la Mejanelle. The family had fled France after the revocation of the Edict of Nantes. He was baptised at the French Huguenot church of St Martin Orgars in London. His godfather was Gerard Vanneck, a wealthy merchant, who later supported his career. DeVisme was educated at Westminster School between 1737 and 1741.

He was likely an apprentice in the London trading house of Gerard Vanneck, his godfather. DeVisme was an active member of the British Factory in Lisbon. He regularly signed official petitions and correspondence defending British commercial interests. He was also owner of the company Purry, Mellish and Devisme, along with David de Purry and Joseph Mellish.

DeVisme's country estate at Benfica, outside Lisbon, was known for its garden of rare and exotic plants. Brazilian botanical specimens were sent to him for cultivation, and the naturalist Domingos Vandelli, a consultant to the Portuguese court, shared samples received from Brazil with him. The garden was depicted by the French painter Jean Pillement in 1785.

DeVisme was known for throwing large parties in Lisbon and connecting the intelligentsia of the city.
