= Mellish (disambiguation) =

Mellish is a surname. It may also refer to:

- Mellish (1819 ship), a ship sailing between Great Britain and India from 1819 to 1844
- Mellish (crater), a crater on Mars
- Mellish Reef, a coral reef in the Coral Sea Islands of Australia
- Mellish Road Methodist Chapel, a chapel in Walsall, England from 1910 to 2011
- Henry Mellish School and Specialist Sports College, a former secondary school in Nottingham, England
