= Melis =

Melis is both a surname and a given name. Notable people with the name include:

== Given name ==
- Melis Abzalov (1938–2016), Uzbek actor, screenwriter, film director and producer
- Melis Alphan (born 1978), Turkish journalist and author
- Melis Babadağ (born 1984), Turkish actress
- Melis Birkan (born 1981), Turkish actress
- Melis Gerritsen (born 1939), Dutch track cyclist
- Melis Gülcan (born 1996), Turkish female basketball player
- Melis van de Groep (born 1958), Dutch politician of the Reformed Political League
- Melis Myrzakmatov (born 1969), Kyrgyzstani politician
- Melis Özçiğdem (born 1982), Turkish football player and referee
- Melis Sekmen (born 1993), German politician
- Melis Sezen (born 1997), Turkish actress
- Melis Sezer (born 1993), Turkish tennis player
- Melis Stoke (c.1235-c.1305 ), Dutch writer and clerk of Floris V, count of Holland
- Melis Turgunbaev (born 1982), Kyrgyz politician and government official
- Melis Yılmaz (born 1997), Turkish volleyball player
- Tuğba Melis Türk (born 1990), Turkish actress and model

== Surname ==
- Alberto Melis (born 1993), Italian football midfielder
- Anastasios Melis, American plant biologist
- Antal Melis (born 1946), Hungarian rower
- Béla Melis (born 1959), Hungarian football forward
- Bill Melis (born 1960), Greek–American basketball player
- Carmen Melis (1885–1967), Italian opera singer
- Charles Melis (fl. 1920), Belgian long-distance runner
- Cornelia Melis (born 1960), Aruban long-distance runner
- Dorothea Melis (1938–2015), German fashion journalist
- Efisio Melis (1890–1970), Sardinian folk musician
- Emiliano Melis (born 1979), retired Italian football striker
- Federigo Melis (1914–1973), Italian economic historian
- Felipe Melis (born 1979), male Spanish long jumper of Cuban origin
- Giovanni Melis Fois (1916–2009), Italian Prelate of Roman Catholic Church
- György Melis (1923–2009), Hungarian opera bariton
- Harry Melis (born 1957), Dutch football winger
- José Melis (1920–2005), Cuban-American bandleader and television personality
- José Manuel Hermosa Melis (born 1989), Spanish footballer who plays for CD Alcoyano
- Jozef Melis (1919–1994), Belgian footballer
- Karin Melis Mey (born 1983), South African-born Turkish long jumper
- László Melis (1953–2018), Hungarian composer and violinist
- Manon Melis (born 1986), Dutch football forward, daughter of Harry
- Marcello Melis (1939–1994), Italian jazz musician
- Roger Melis (1940–2009), German photographer
- Roland Melis (born 1974), Netherlands Antilles triathlete
- Tancred Melis (1934–2013), South African cricketer
- Vito Melis (1909–1976), Italian boxer
- Zoltán Melis (born 1947), Hungarian rower

Van Melis

- Mirella van Melis (born 1979), Dutch track and road racing cyclist
- Noud van Melis (1924–2001), Dutch football forward

== See also ==
- Duo Melis, Classical guitar duo
- Melissus (disambiguation)
- Meli (disambiguation), a surname and given name
- Mellis (disambiguation)
