= The Ground of Arts =

English arithmetic textbook

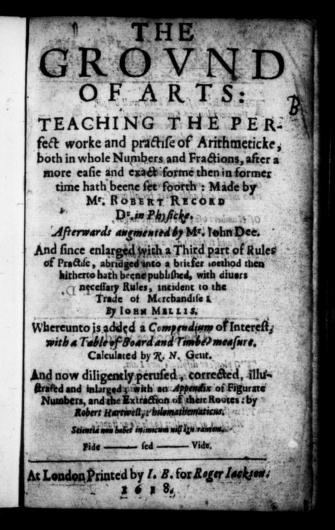
- First edition title page
- Author: Robert Recorde
- Genre: Mathematics
- Publication date: 1614

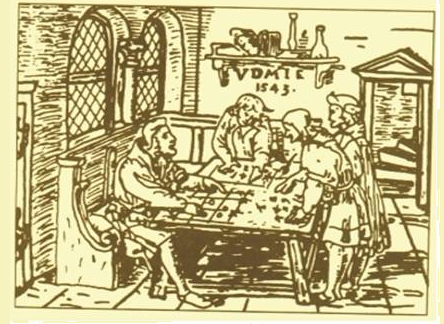
The Ground of Arts

Robert Recorde's Arithmetic: or, The Ground of Arts was one of the first printed English textbooks on arithmetic and the most popular of its time. The Ground of Arts appeared in London in 1543, and it was reprinted around 45 more editions until 1700. Editors and contributors of new sections included John Dee, John Mellis, Robert Hartwell, Thomas Willsford, and finally Edward Hatton.

The text is in the format of a dialogue between master and student to facilitate learning arithmetic without a teacher.
