= Melli (name) =

Melli is an Italian surname. Notable people with the surname include:

- Ahmad Melli (1940s–2026), Syrian actor
- Alessandro Melli (born 1969), Italian footballer
- Elide Melli (born 1952) is an Italian actress
- Nello Melli (1923–1986), Argentine film editor
- Nicolò Melli (born 1991), Italian professional basketball player
- Rina Melli (1882–1958), Italian socialist activist and journalist
- Roberto Melli (1885–1958), Italian painter and sculptor

== See also ==
- Melli (Spanish footballer) birth name Juan Alberto Andreu Alvarado (born 1984), Spanish footballer
- Melli (disambiguation)
