= Jean-Pierre Pury =

Swiss explorer (1675–1736)

Mayor of Lignières
- In office 13 May 1709 – 17 September 1711

Personal details
- Born: 1675 Neuchâtel, Principality of Neuchâtel
- Died: 17 August 1736 (aged 60–61) Colony of Purrysburg; Province of South Carolina, British America
- Spouse: Lucrèce Chaillet
- Children: 8 (including David)
- Occupation: geographer, explorer, politician

Jean-Pierre Pury (1675 – 17 August 1736) was an explorer, geographer and colonist from the Principality of Neuchâtel. He served as mayor of Lignières and worked as a wine merchant before losing his wealth to a fire. He then worked as a corporal for the Dutch East India Company, which inspired him to found his own colony. After years of campaigning, he was granted permission by the British Crown to establish a settlement in the Province of Carolina. He established the Colony of Purrysburg (present day Purrysburg, South Carolina) and lived as a planter on 12,000 acres. His colony, made up of mostly Swiss Protestants, was relatively unsuccessful.

== Early life and family ==
Pury was born in 1675 in Neuchâtel, Principality of Neuchâtel (in present-day Switzerland) to Henry Pury and Marie Hersler. His father, who was a tradesman of tin pottery, died when he was an infant. His mother remarried to Louis Quinche, a patrician and member of the Grand Council of Neuchâtel. His mother died in 1695 and left him a small inheritance. On 24 September 1695, he married Lucrèce Chaillet, the daughter of a Huguenot pastor from Serrières. Pury and Chaillet had eight children: Charles, François-Louis, Marie-Marguerite, Rose, Lucrèce, Jean-Henri, David, and Marie. Four of their children died in infancy between 1700 and 1709.

On 13 May 1709, he was appointed as the mayor of Lignières. That same year, a fire burned down his family's house. Pury exported wine from Neuchâtel to Holland and England, but the venture did not provide enough income for his family. Left destitute, the Court of Justice of Neuchâtel appointed the bourgeois Martinet as curator over Pury's property and affairs. Given his position, Jean-Pierre resigned from his post as mayor on 17 September 1711.

== Colonial pursuits ==
=== Dutch East India Company ===
In May 1713, Pury boarded the Prince Eugenius bound for Batavia, Dutch East Indies. He had been made a Corporal for Dutch East India Company and helped lead the Huguenot congregation in Batavia. While travelling with the company, he developed a climatological theory to advise on the best places for effective colonization. In 1718, he published Mémoire sur le Pays des Cafres and la Terre de Nuyts, where he defended a concept of twelve climates between the North Pole and South Pole and that the fifth climate, located at approximately 33 ° latitude, was the best for colonization due to fertile soil. He presented the concepts to Christophel von Swol, the Governor of Batavia, with the hopes of being granted permission to start his own colonies in Australia or Southern Africa, but was dismissed. Pury then left Batavia for France.

=== Province of Carolina ===
While living in France, Pury presented his theories to Horatio Walpole, 1st Baron Walpole, the British Ambassador to France, and asked that they be brought before King George I with the hopes of being granted permission to form a colony. The book of theories was brought before Thomas Pelham-Holles, 1st Duke of Newcastle in July 1724. The book was examined by the Board of Trade for legality and feasibility. The Board summoned Richard Shelton, Secretary of the Lords Proprietor of Carolina. In June 1726, Pury was granted permission to start a colony in Carolina. The agreement between the Lords Proprietor was that one-hundred people from Neuchâtel would settle the new colony, but no funding was to be provided. Unable to provide the finances, Pury left Neuchâtel. The English Crown later took over Carolina from the Lords Proprietor. George II appointed Robert Johnson as the new Governor of South Carolina. On 9 July 1730, Pury petitioned again for permission to establish a settlement. The Crown granted Pury permission to establish a settlement with six-hundred Swiss Protestant emigrants over a six-year period. In exchange, he was granted 12,000 acres of land. In 1731, Purry led an expedition to Carolina and founded the Colony of Purrysburg along the Savannah River. In 1732, the first convoy of settlers arrived, Swiss-French Huguenots, Swiss-German Lutherans, and Austrian and Italian Protestant refugees. The colony was relatively unsuccessful, and Pury died of malaria in 1736. He was succeeded by his son, Charles, as head of the colony. Charles was later killed by one of his slaves.

== Written works ==
- Mémoire sur le pais des Cafres et la terre des Nuyts : Par rapport à l’utilité que la Compagnie des Indes orientales pourroit en retirer pour son commerce, Chez Pierre Humbert, Amsterdam, 1718.
- Second mémoire sur le pais des Cafres et la terre des Nuyts : Servant d'éclaircissement aux propositions faites dans le premier, pour l'utilité de la Compagnie des Indes orientales, Chez Pierre Humbert, Amsterdam, 1718.
- Mémoire présenté à Sa Gr. Mylord Duc de Newcastle ... sur l'état présent de la Caroline et sur les moyens de l'améliorer, Londres, G. Bowyer, 1724.
- Spéculation sur les changes étrangers, pour la commodité des banquiers et autres négocians, contentant le juste rapport avec les principales place d’Europe, Paris, Chez Knapen, 1726.
- Description abrégée de l’état présent de la Caroline Méridionale, Neuchâtel, 1732.
