= Thomas Hickey (painter) =

Irish painter (1741–1824)

- Born: 13 May 1741; Dublin, Ireland
- Died: May 1824 (aged 82–83); Madras, India
- Occupation: painter

Thomas Hickey (c. 13 May 1741 – May 1824) was an Irish painter.

== Life ==
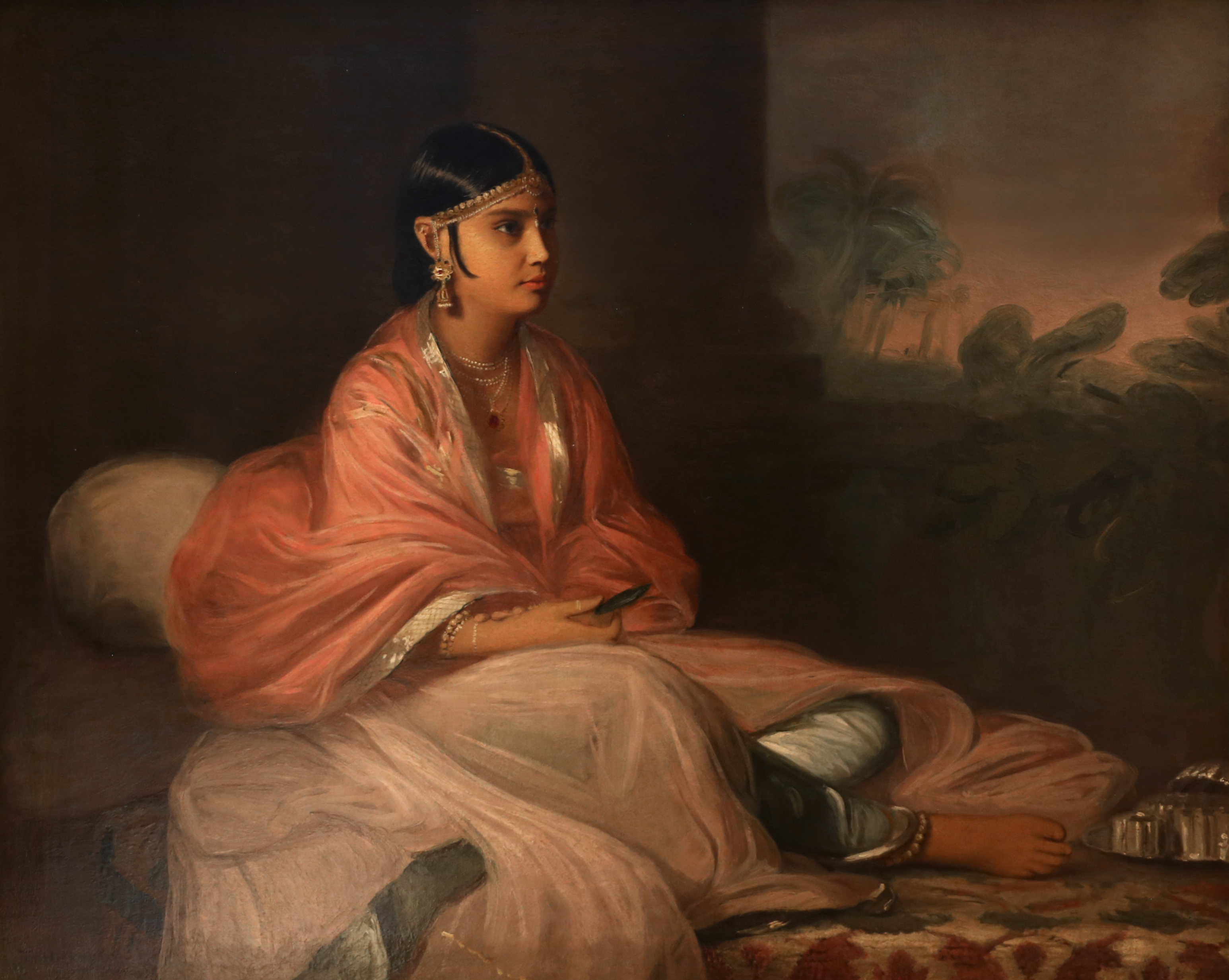
An Indian Lady (Indian bibi Jemdanee), a 1787 painting by Hickey. It is possibly a depiction of William Hickey's Bengali partner Jemdanee.

Born in Bachelor's Walk, Dublin most likely on 13 May 1741. Hickey was the son of Noah (1689–1766), a confectioner in Capel Street, and Anne Hickey. A younger brother was John Hickey, the sculptor. He was trained at the Royal Dublin Society schools under Robert West.

Hickey painted primarily portraits and genre scenes. He travelled widely, working in India, Portugal, Italy and England, residing in Bath between 1776 and 1780. On his voyage to India, the vessel in which he was travelling was captured by French and Spanish fleets which led him to Lisbon, where, after receiving a number of commissions, he remained for several years. He eventually reached Bengal and stayed there until 1791 when he returned to England. He then traveled as far as Peking, China with George Macartney, 1st Earl Macartney as the expedition's official portrait painter.

He returned to Ireland shortly after the death of his brother John in January 1796. In 1797, he was commissioned by Dr. Robert Emmet, State Physician for Ireland, to paint a portrait of the doctor's son, Robert, and daughter, Mary. By 1798 he had returned to India where he landed just in time for the start of the Fourth Mysore War, which kept him engaged in painting. In Mysore he was commissioned to make a number of sketches depicting family members of Mysore's ruler Tipu Sultan. Portraits of Tipu's sons, uncle and subaider are amongst these sketches. These portrait sketches were drawn between 1799 and 1801 in Srirangapatna and Vellore. He resided in Madras until his death in 1824. He had at least two daughters, but the details of his marriage are not known.

In addition to his artistic talents, he is reputed to have been a gifted conversationalist who rarely failed to charm his sitters. The Courtauld Institute of Art (London), the Honolulu Museum of Art, the National Gallery of Ireland, the Tate and the Victoria Art Gallery (Bath, England) are among the public collections having paintings by Hickey. A number of his sketches can still be seen in Srirangapattana at Daria Daulat Bagh.

== Gallery ==
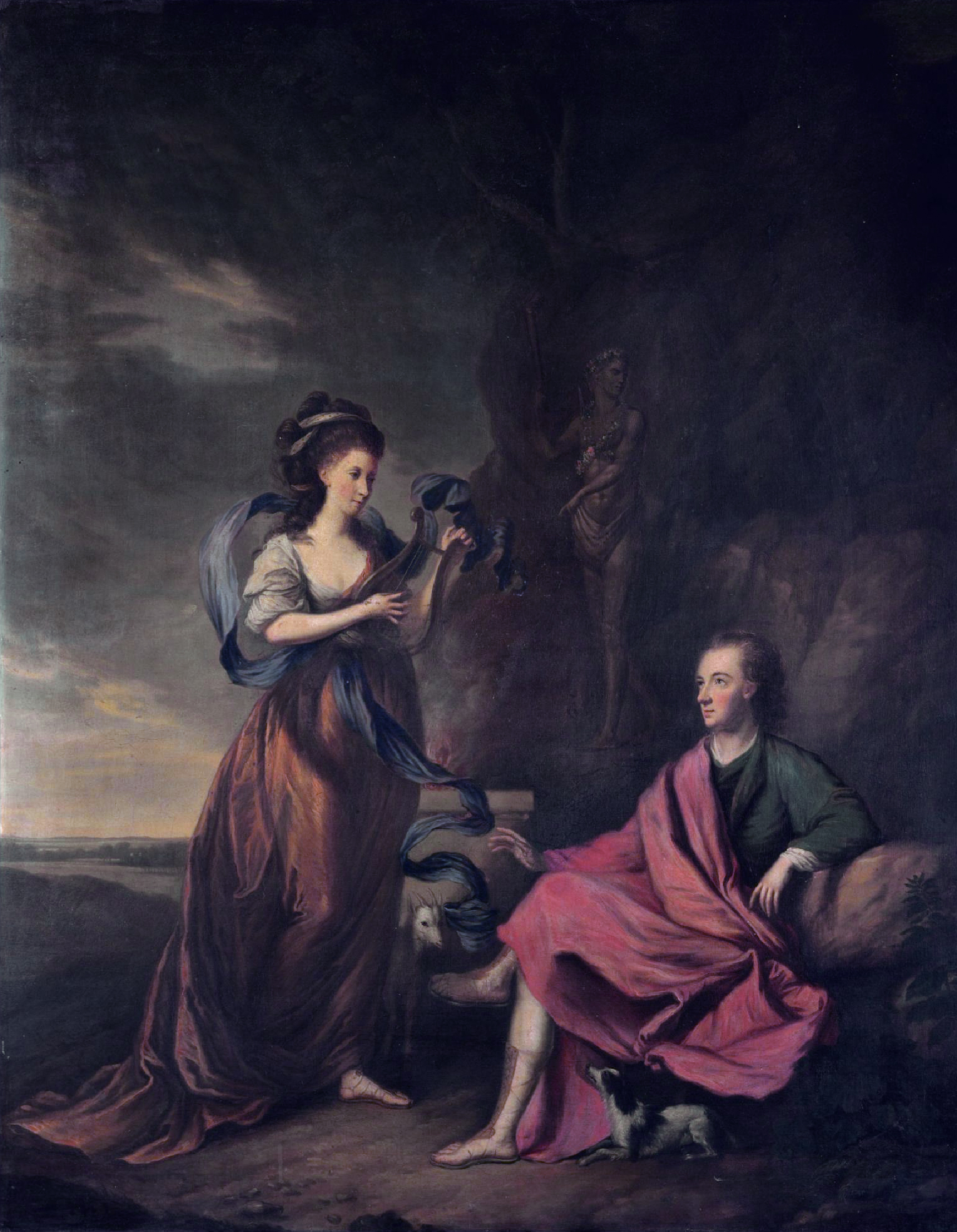
Arthur Wolfe and his wife Anne (1769)

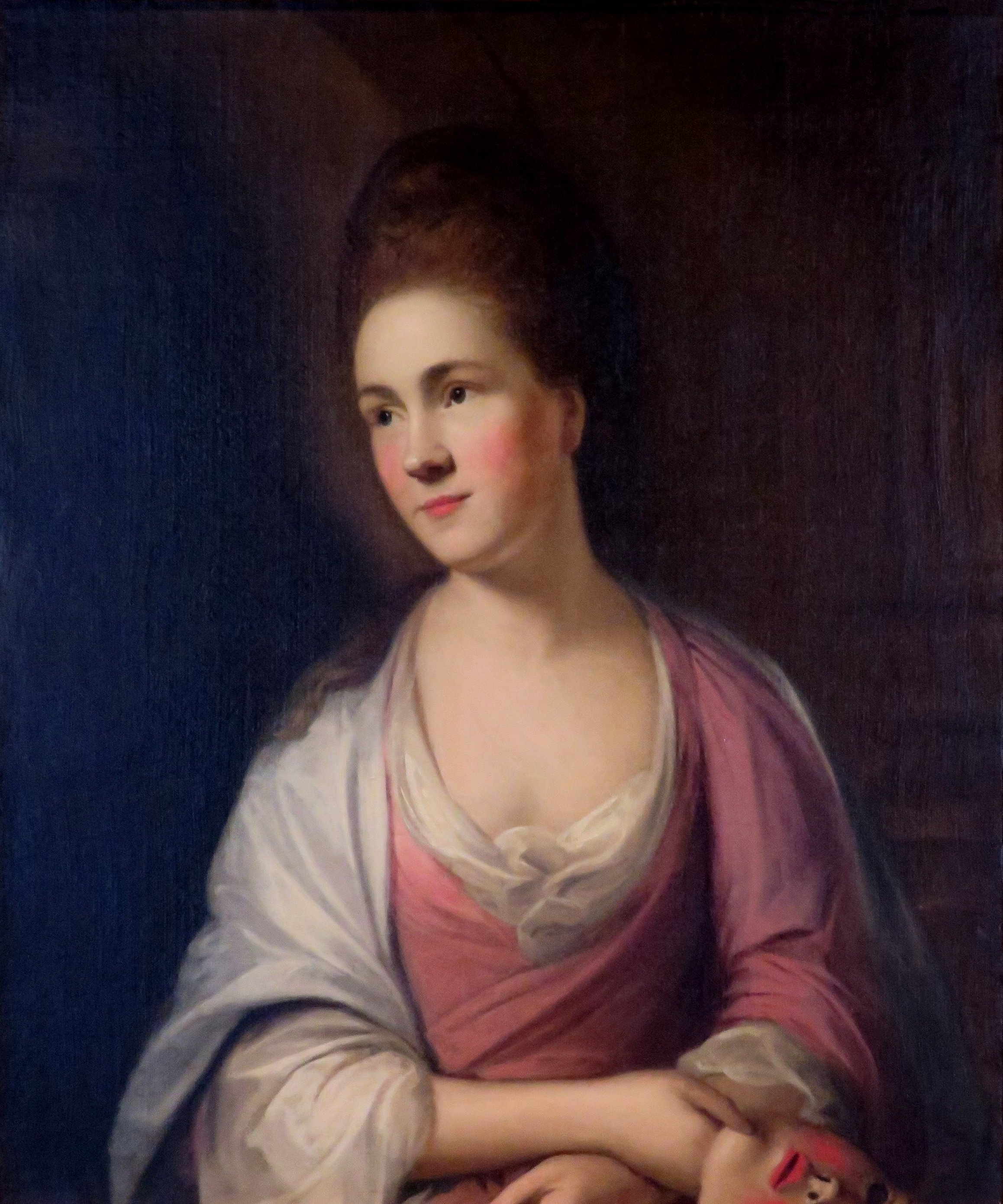
The Actress Elizabeth Younge with Bust of Shakespeare (1774)

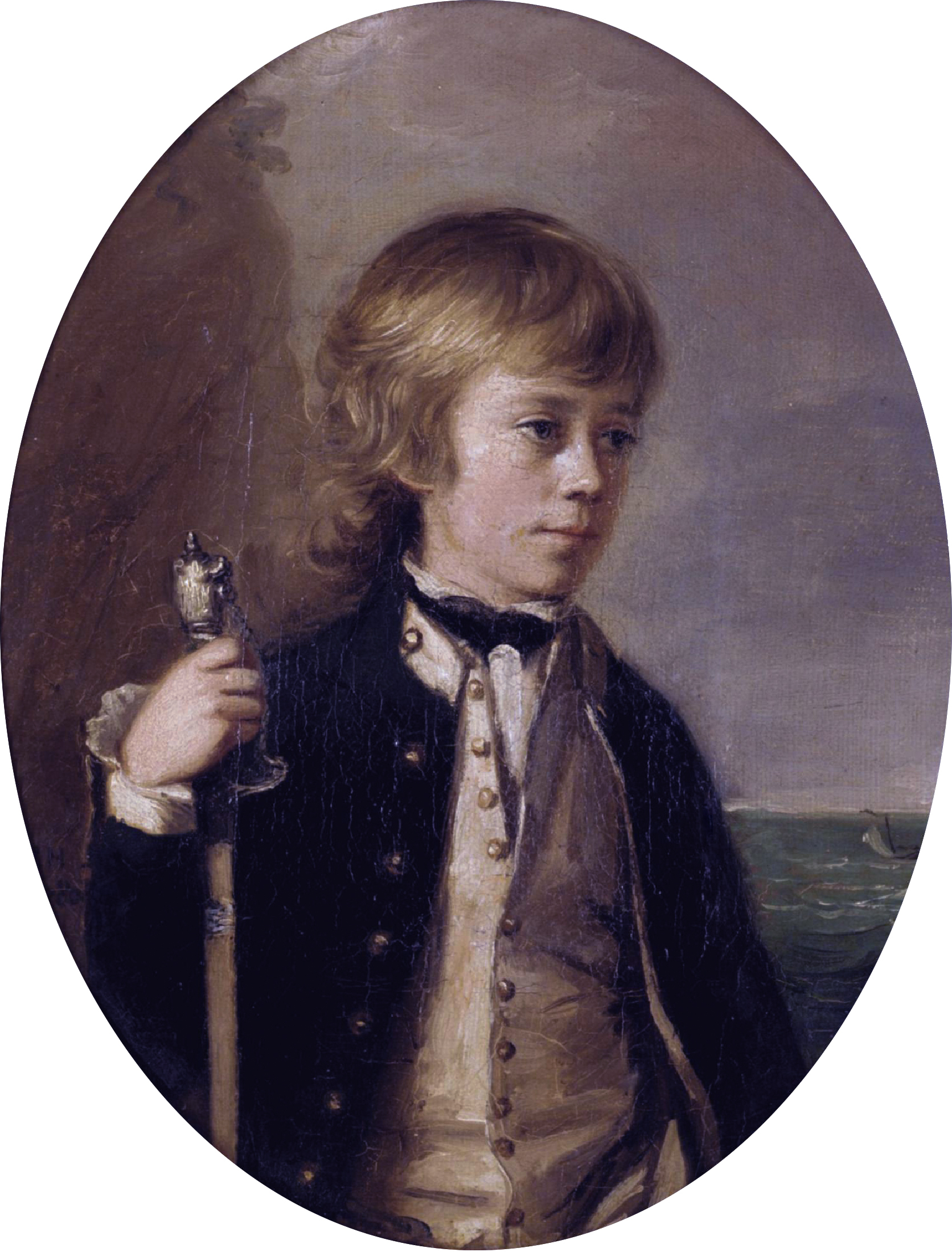
Henry William Baynton (1780)

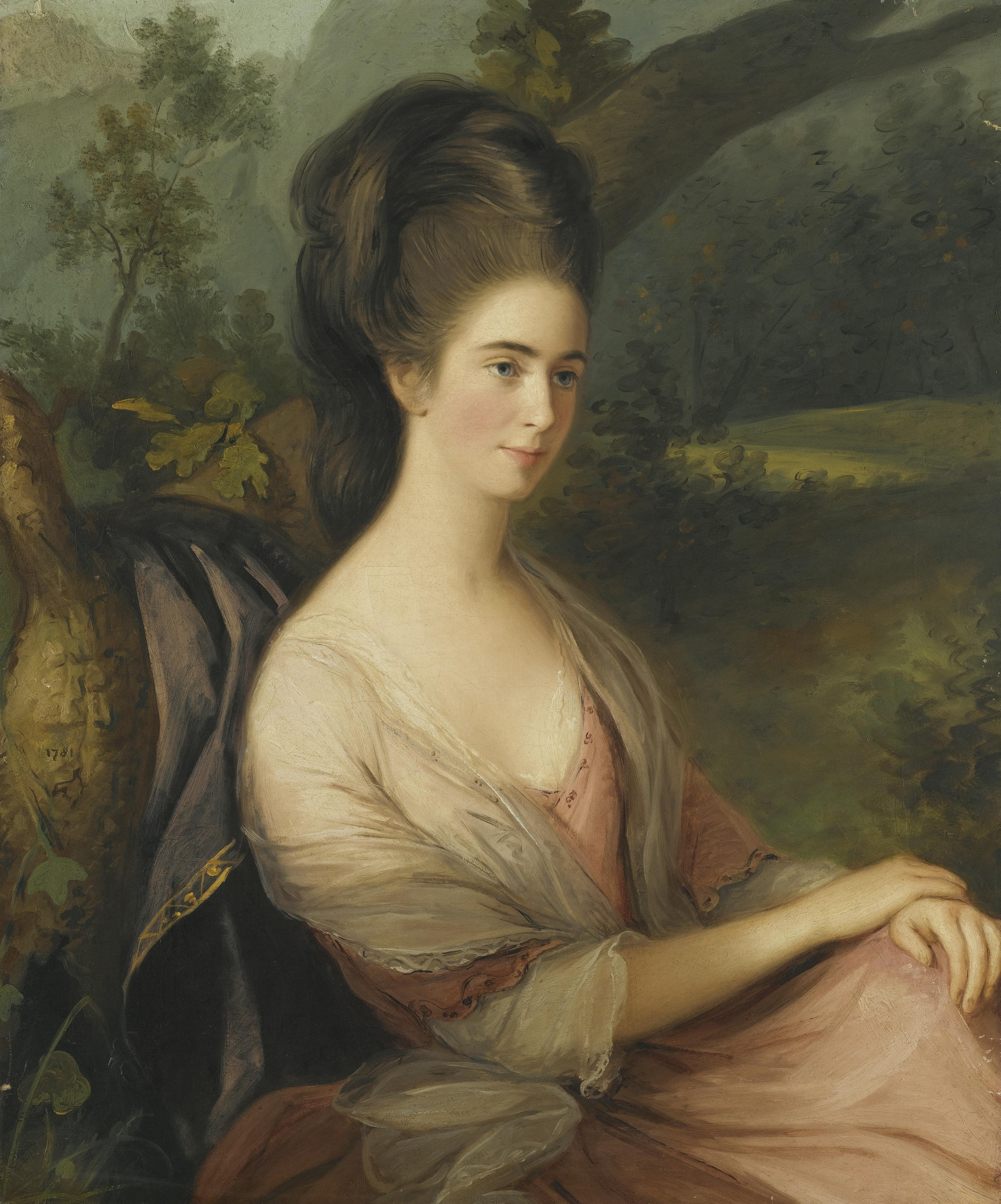
Portrait of Miss Charlotte Dee (1781)

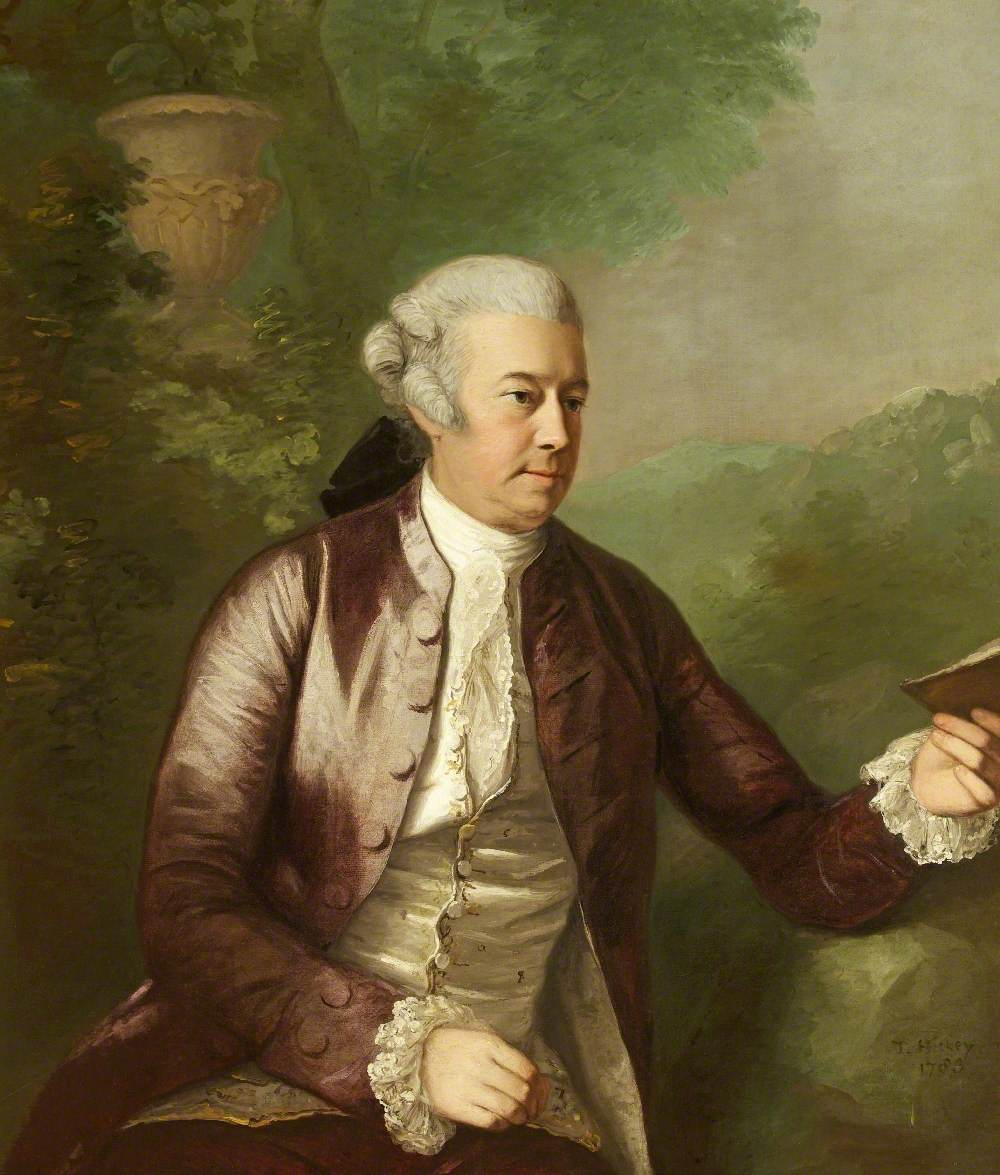
Gérard DeVisme (1783)

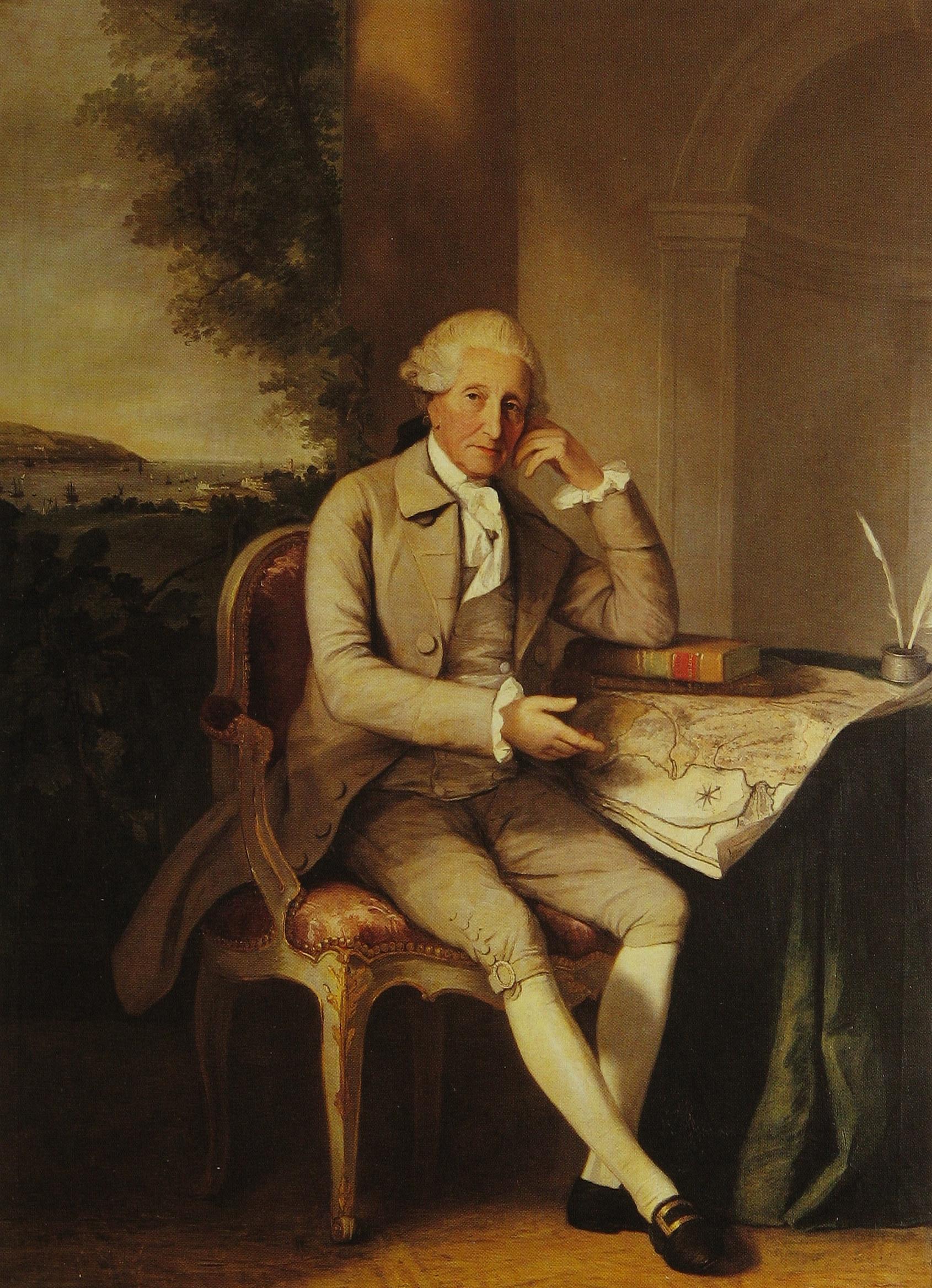
David de Pury (1786)

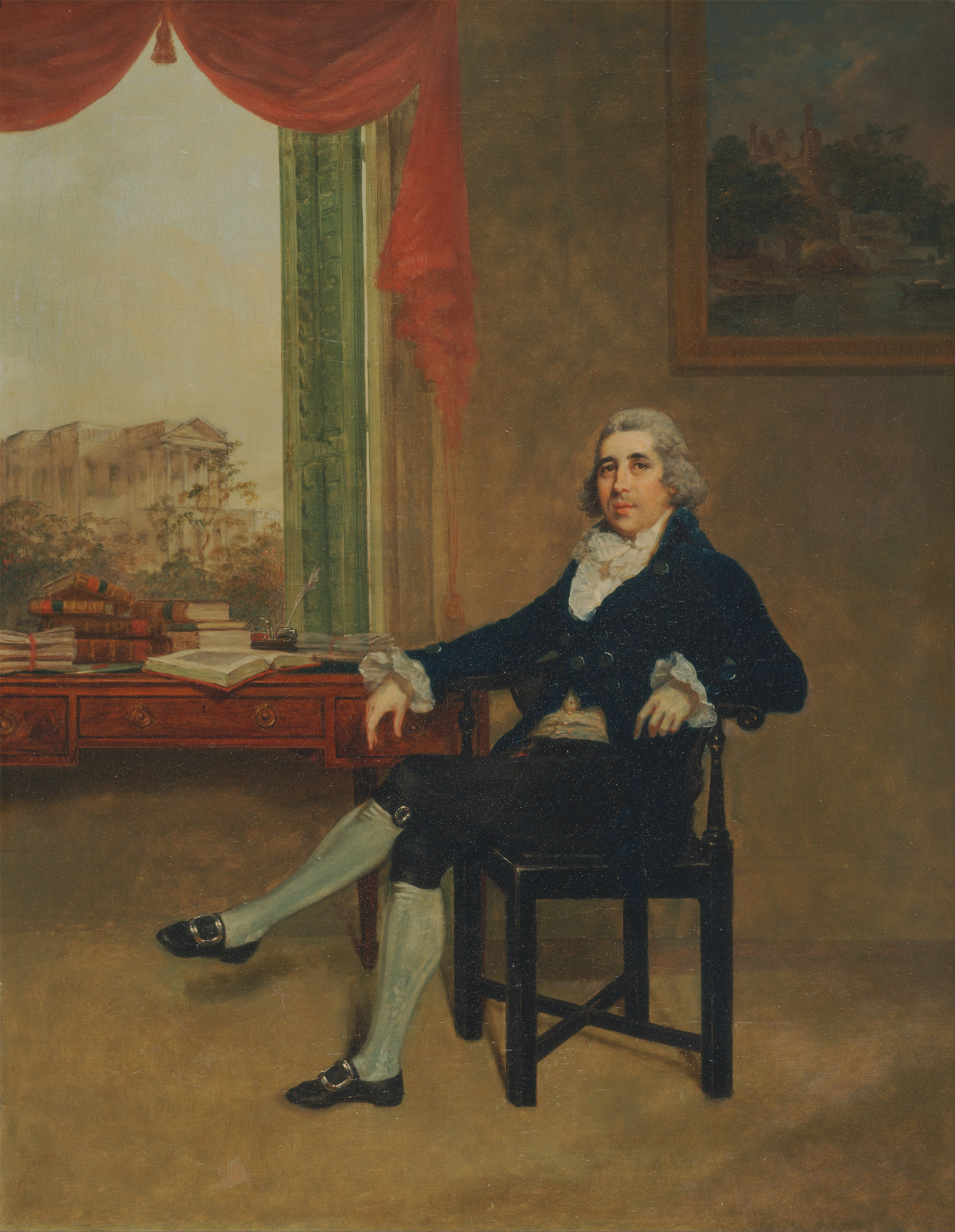
Thomas Graham (c. 1790)

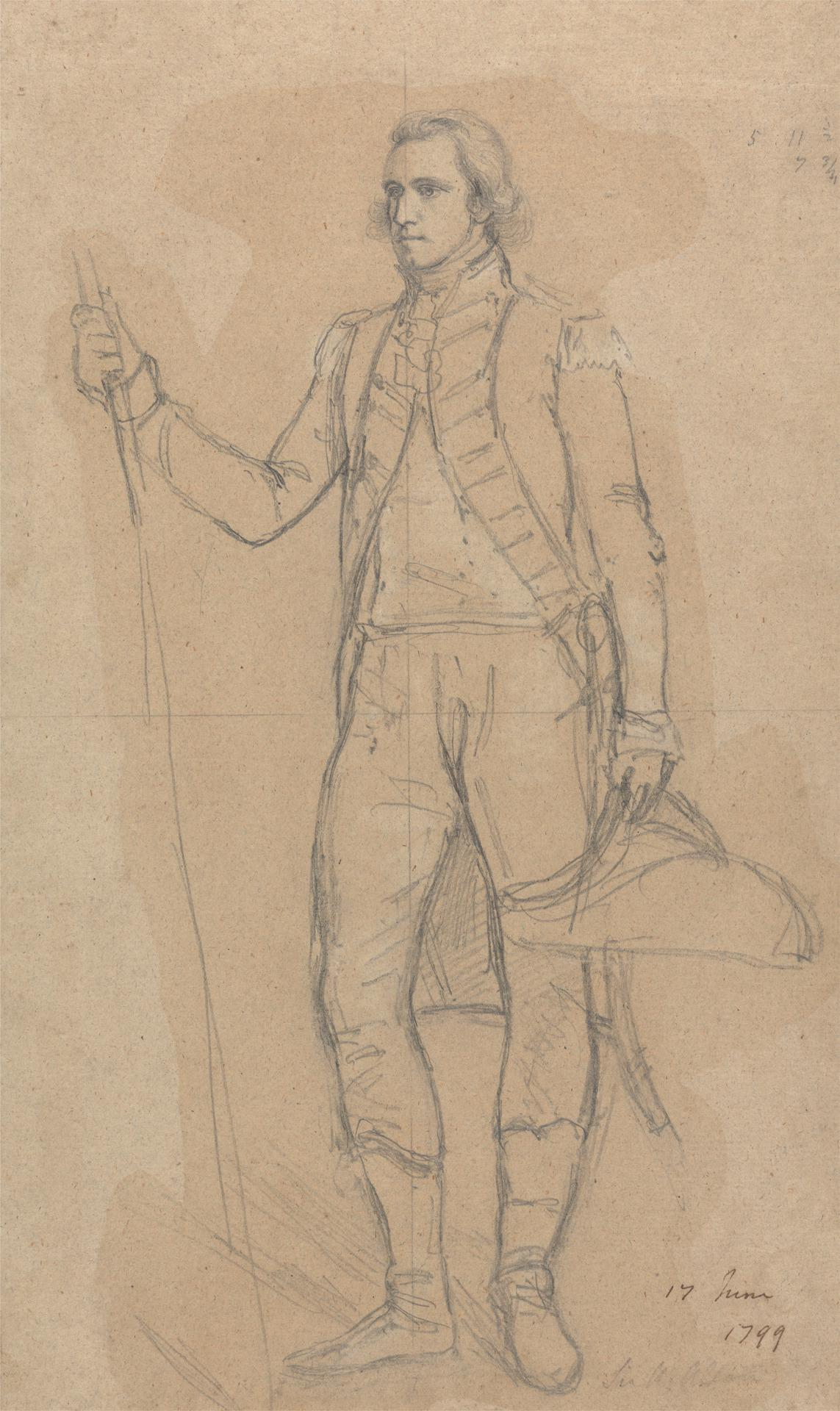
Study of Sir Alexander Allan (1799)

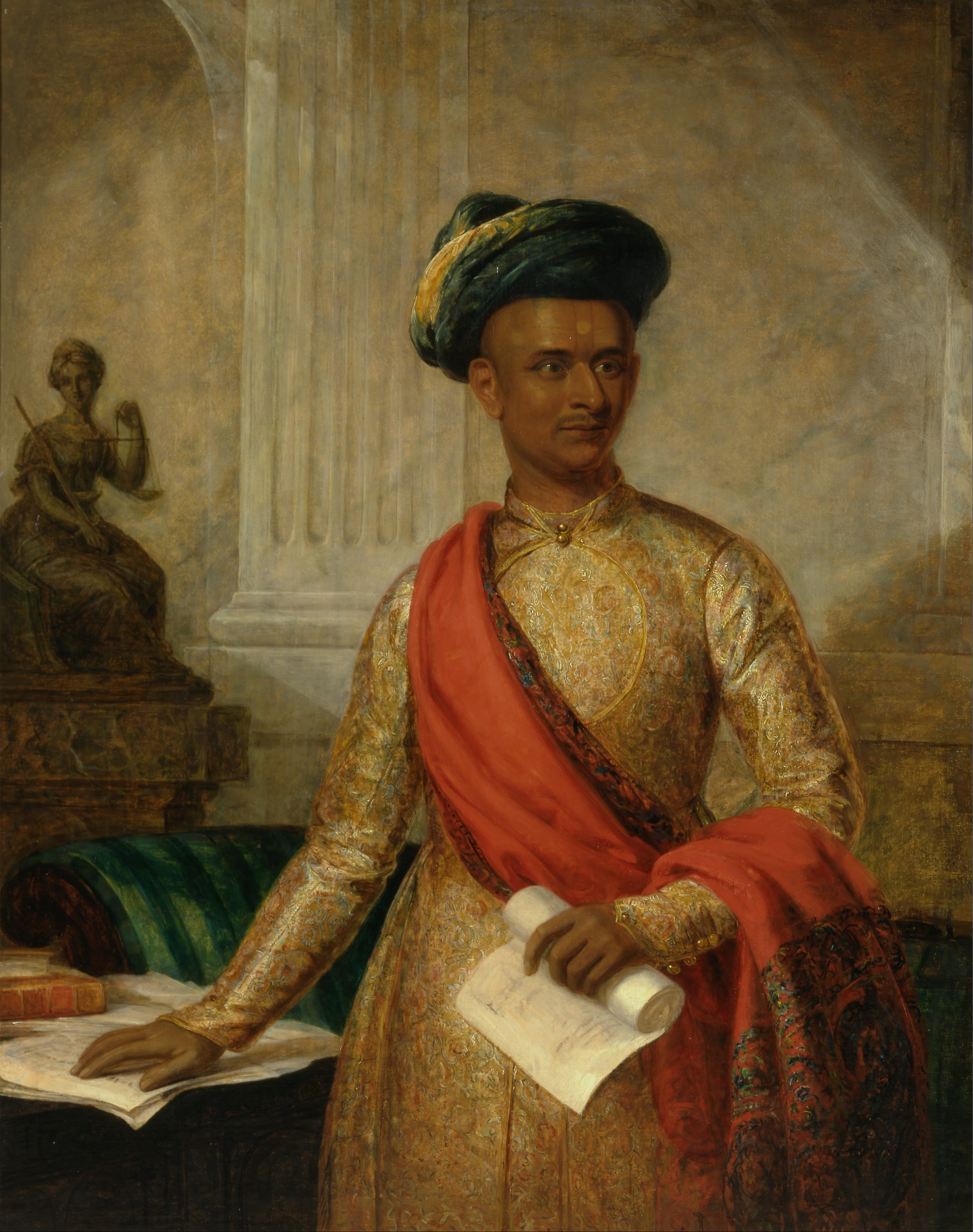
Purniya, Chief Minister of Mysore (1801)

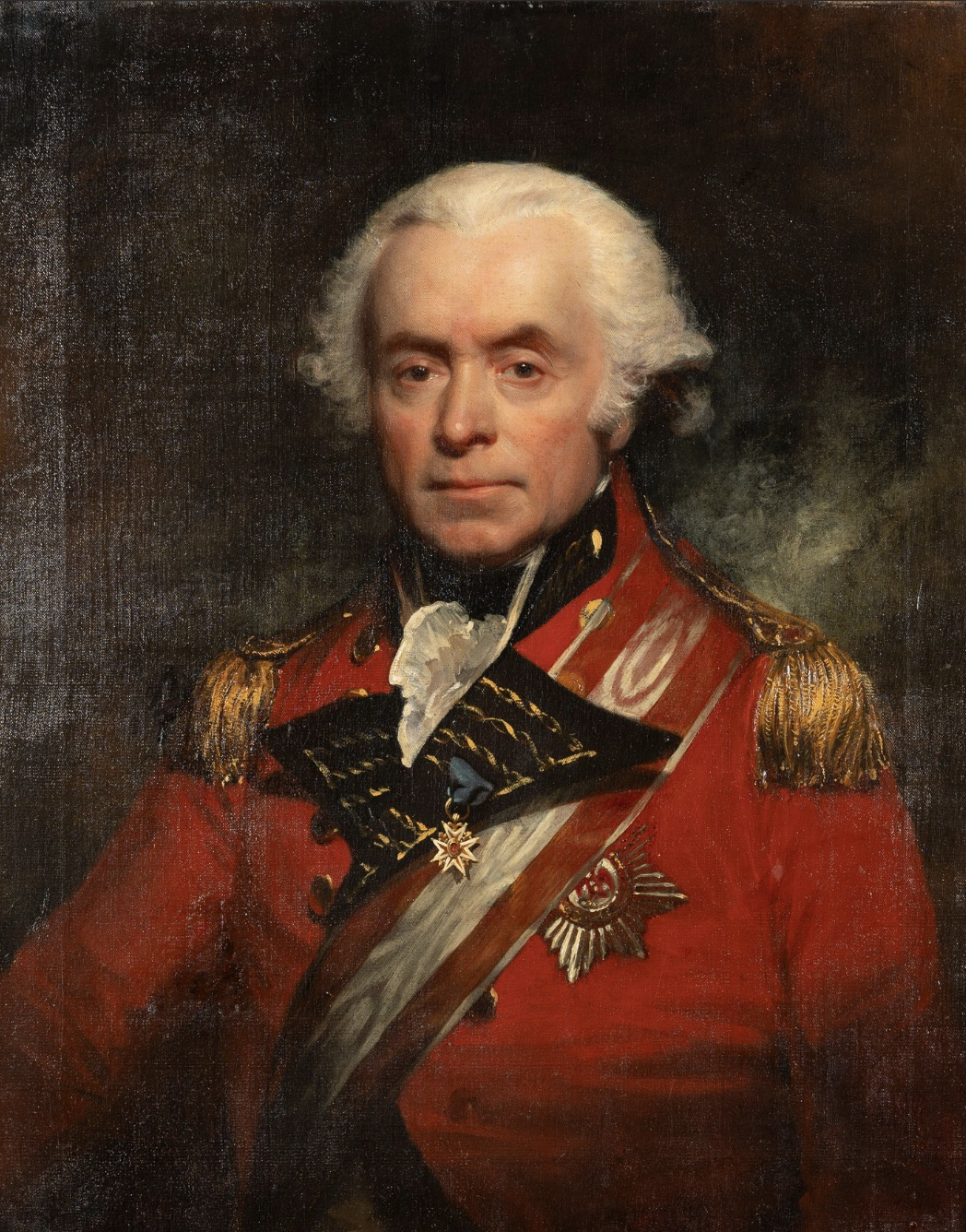
Charles-Daniel de Meuron (c. 1802)

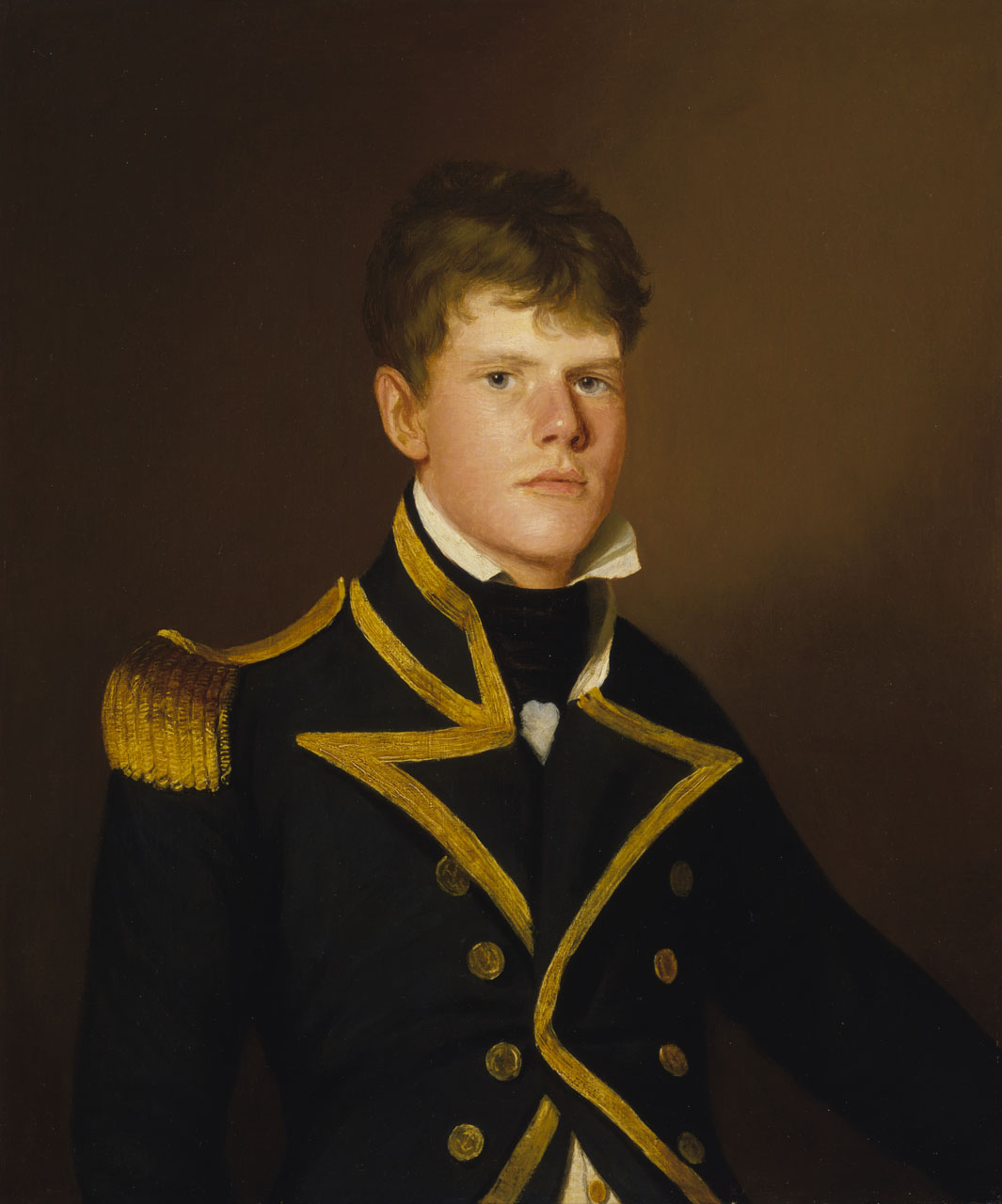
Captain Peter Rainier (1806)

Raja Virendra Mohan Dar, oil-on-canvas 1816, Dacca.

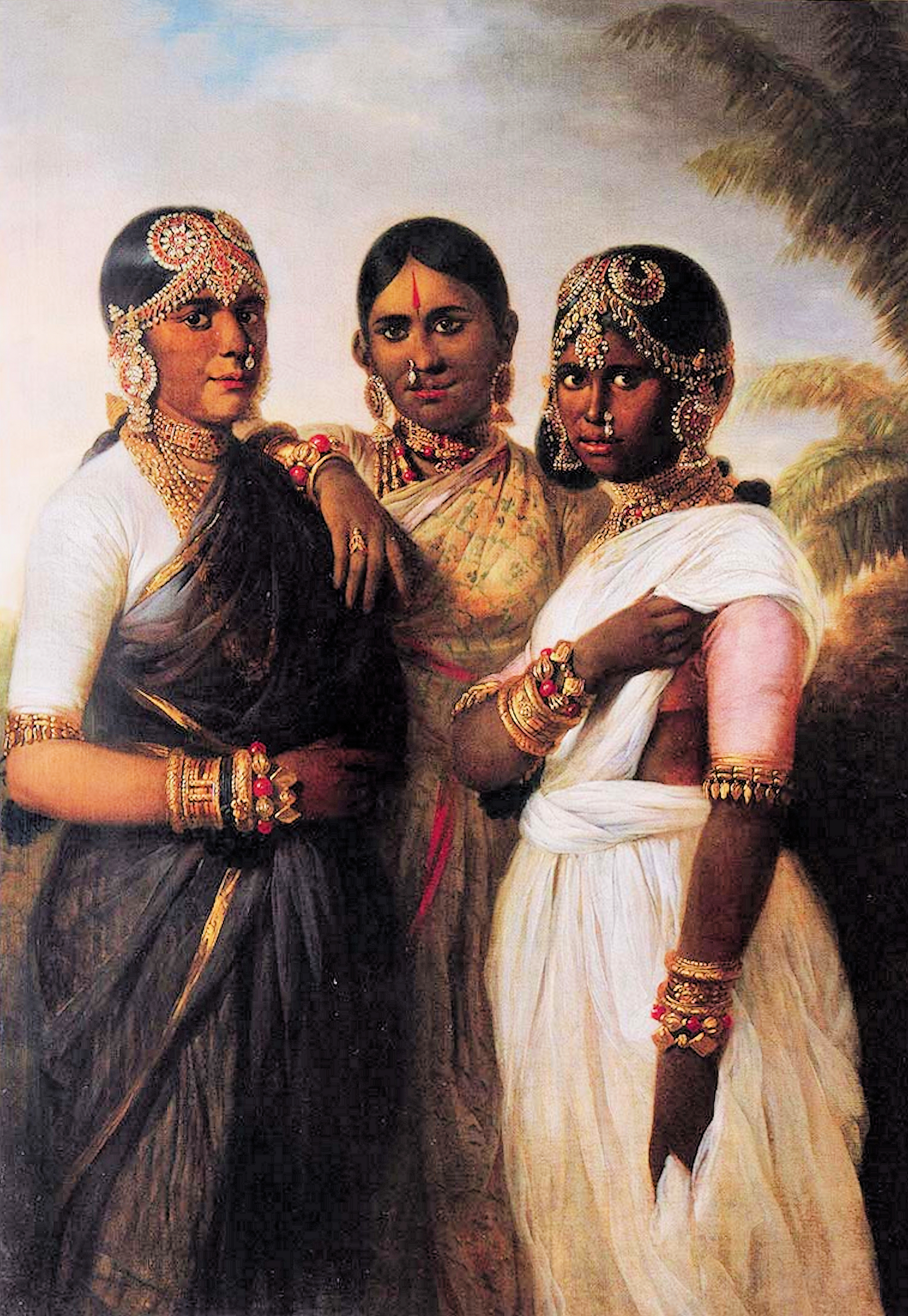
Queens of Mysore (1805)

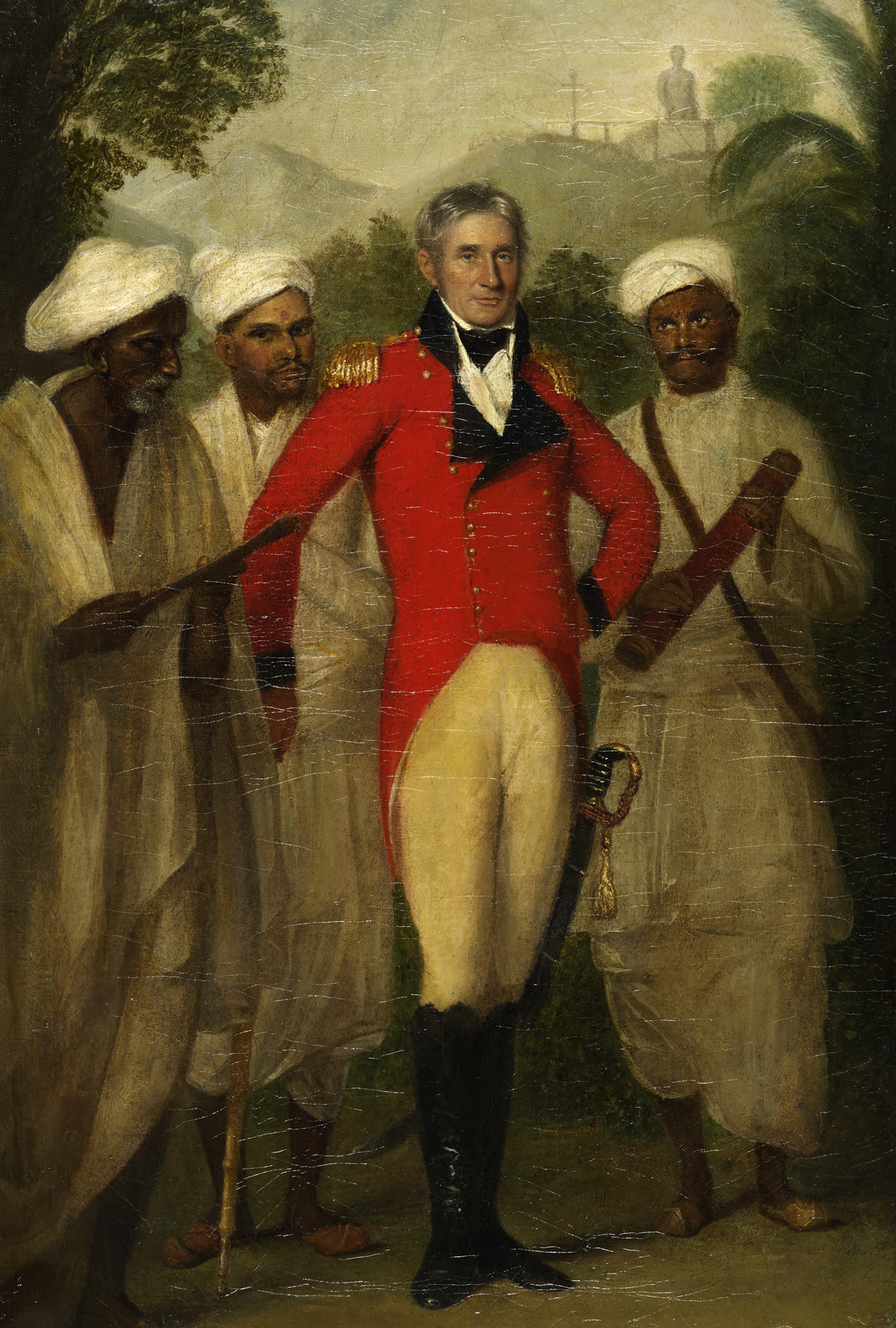
Colonel Colin Mackenzie and his Indian pandits (1816)

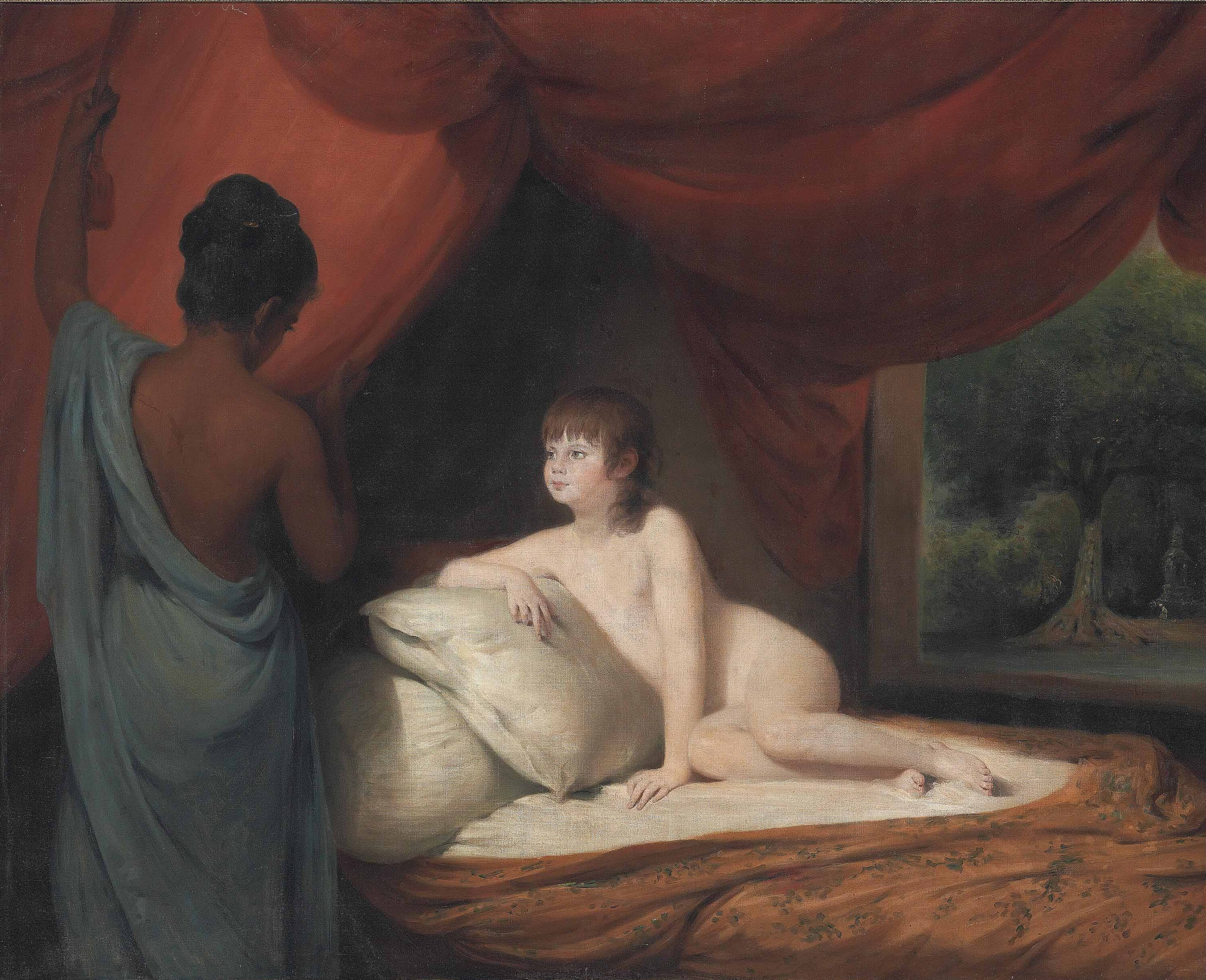
Portrait of a young boy on a bed, being attended by his ayah (Date unknown)
