= Vanneck =

Vanneck is a surname. Notable people with the surname include:

- Gerard Vanneck (1743–1791), British merchant and politician
- Joshua Vanneck (disambiguation)
  - Joshua Vanneck, 1st Baron Huntingfield, British merchant and politician
  - Joshua Vanneck, 2nd Baron Huntingfield, British peer and politician
  - Sir Joshua Vanneck, 1st Baronet, British-Dutch merchant
- Peter Vanneck (1922–1999), British Royal Navy officer, fighter pilot, engineer, stockbroker, and politician
- William Vanneck, 5th Baron Huntingfield (1883–1969), British politician, Governor of Victoria, and Administrator of Australia
