= Melli (disambiguation) =

Melli is a town in India.

Melli may also refer to:

== People ==
- Melli (name), list of people with the name

== Other ==
- Andraca melli, moth of the family Endromidae
- Bank Melli Iran, an Iranian bank
- Chaqar Shir Melli, a village in Golestan Province, Iran
- Melli Kandi, a village in Ardabil Province, Iran
- Melli, Iran, a village in Razavi Khorasan Province, Iran
- Team Melli, nickname for the Iranian national football team

== See also ==
- Mellis (disambiguation)
- Millet (Ottoman Empire)
