= Mellis (surname) =

Mellis is a surname. Notable people with the surname include:

- Jacob Mellis (born 1991), English footballer
- John Mellis (fl. 16th century), English author
- Louis Mellis (fl. 1988–2010), Scottish actor and screenwriter
- Margaret Mellis (1914–2009), Scottish artist
