= Monocerotids =

Meteor showers

The Monocerotids refers to two separate meteor showers originating from the constellation of Monoceros. The Alpha Monocerotids, the more prominent of the two showers, takes place in November, while the second, lesser-known December Monocerotids shower takes place in December and appears to have an orbit similar to that of comet C/1917 F1 (Mellish).
