= Mellis (disambiguation) =

Mellis is a village in Suffolk, England.

Mellis may also refer to:

- Mellis (surname)
- Sir Mellis Napier (1882–1976), Australian judge and academic administrator

== See also ==
- Melis, a surname and given name
- Melli (disambiguation)
- Mellish, a surname
