= C/1907 T1 (Mellish) =

Parabolic comet

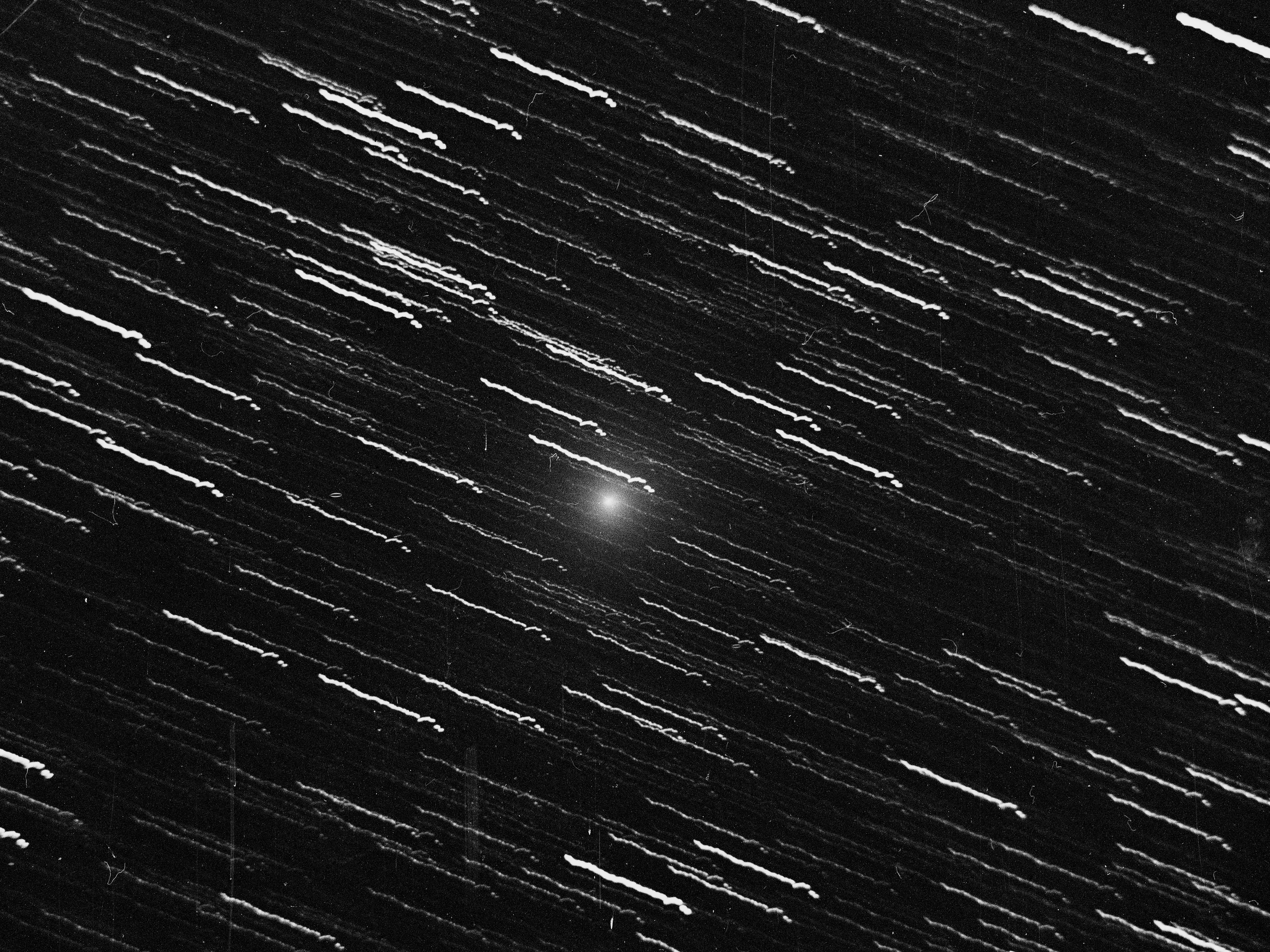
- Mellish's Comet photographed by Max Wolf from the Heidelberg Observatory on 5 November 1907

Discovery
- Discovered by: John E. Mellish
- Discovery site: Cottage Grove, Wisconsin
- Discovery date: 14 October 1907

Designations
- Alternative designations: 1907 V, 1907e

Orbital characteristics
- Epoch: 11 November 1907 (JD 2417890.5)
- Observation arc: 297 days
- Earliest precovery date: 31 March 1907
- Number of observations: 16
- Perihelion: 0.983 AU
- Eccentricity: 1.00001
- Inclination: 119.64°
- Longitude of ascending node: 55.896°
- Argument of periapsis: 294.38°
- Last perihelion: 14 September 1907
- Earth MOID: 0.317 AU
- Jupiter MOID: 1.006 AU

Physical characteristics
- Mean radius: 0.521 km (0.324 mi) (Note: Calculated mean radius using the formula: $\log_{10}\,(\,R\,)\ =\;0.9 -\;0.13 (\,H\,)$ Where $\,H\,$ is the comet's absolute total magnitude (M1))
- Comet total magnitude (M1): 9.1
- Apparent magnitude: 8.0 (1907 apparition)

C/1907 T1 (Mellish) is a faint non-periodic comet that was observed between October 1907 and January 1908. It is the first comet discovered independently by American astronomer, John Edward Mellish. (Note: John E. Mellish co-discovered C/1907 G1 (Grigg–Mellish) with John Grigg about six months before C/1907 T1 was first spotted.)

== Observational history ==
The comet was already on its outbound trajectory when it was first spotted by John E. Mellish on the night of 14 October 1907. At the time, it was an 8th-magnitude object moving towards the northwest within the constellation Hydra. (Note: Reported initial position upon discovery was: α = 8^{h} 31^{m} , δ = –9° 24′)

It was last observed by Max Wolf when it faded to magnitude 16.5 as he photographed it from the Heidelberg Observatory on 22 January 1908.
