= David de Pury =

Swiss philanthropist

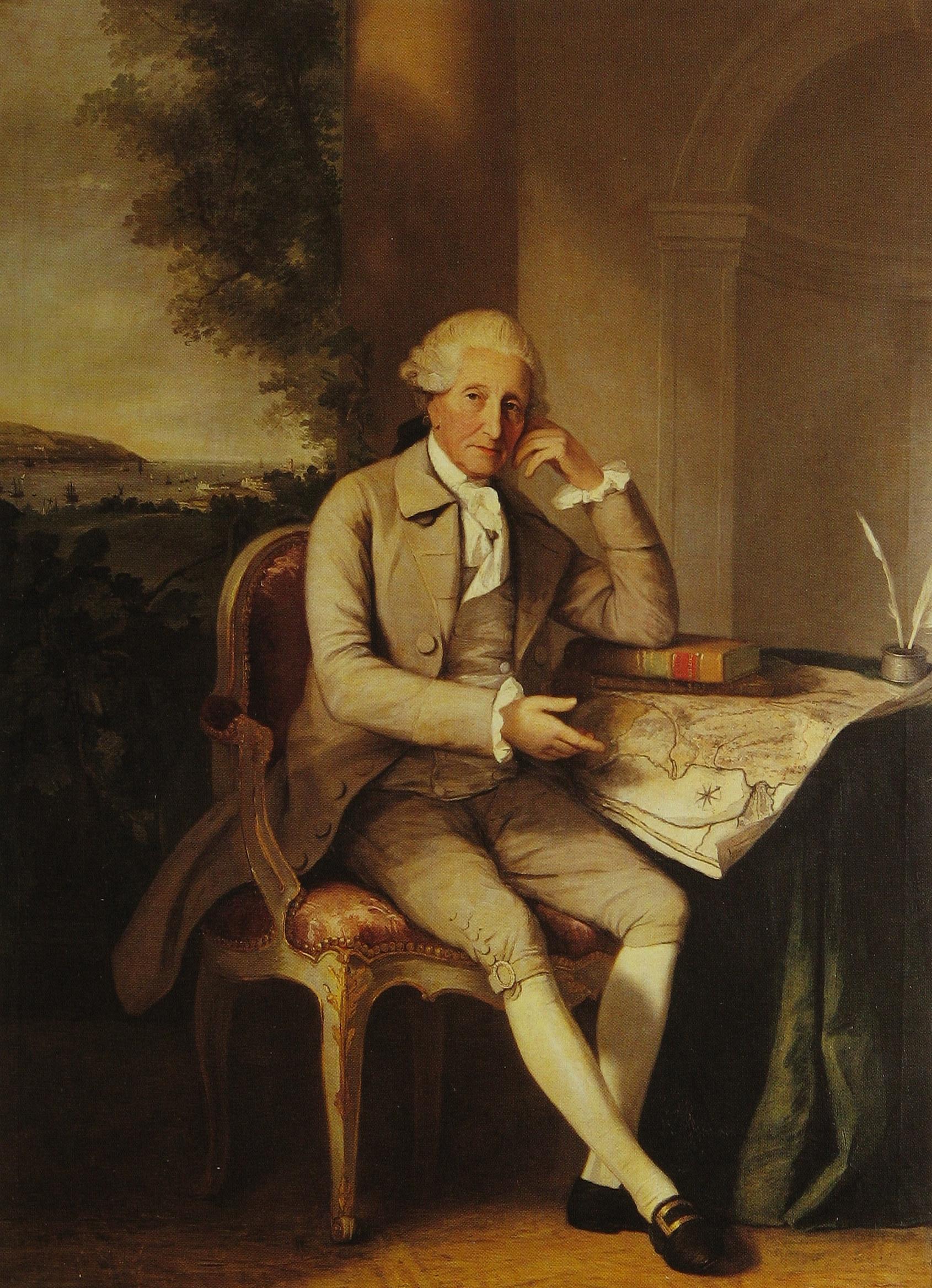
- Portrait by Thomas Hickey, 1782
- Born: David Pury; 19 January 1709; Neuchâtel, Principality of Neuchâtel
- Died: 31 May 1786 (aged 77); Lisbon, Portugal
- Buried: British Cemetery, Lisbon
- Father: Jean-Pierre Pury
- Mother: Lucrèce Chaillet
- Occupation: philanthropist, businessman

Baron David de Pury (born David Pury; 19 January 1709 – 31 May 1786) was a banker, merchant, and philanthropist from Neuchâtel. His involvement in the triangular trade, particularly diamond and precious wood trading between Europe and South America, earned him a vast fortune. Pury became a major benefactor for his hometown, Neuchâtel, where he funded the construction of schools, hospitals, government buildings, and served as a patron of various local charities. He has become a controversial figure in the 21st-century for his connection to the Atlantic slave trade through his business endeavors in Latin America.

== Biography ==
David Pury was born into the Pury family on 19 January 1709 in Neuchâtel, in the Principality of Neuchâtel, an associate state of Switzerland (now a Swiss canton). He was the seventh of eight children of geographer and explorer Jean-Pierre Pury and Lucrèce Chaillet. Pury's father, with the permission of English colonial governor Robert Johnson, founded Purrysburg, a colony in British North America for Swiss Protestants, in present-day South Carolina. Pury's mother came from a Neuchâtelois patrician family of magistrates, pastors and mercenaries. Pury's father died in Purrysburg and was succeeded by his elder son Charles, who was killed during a slave revolt in the colony in 1754.

In 1726, Pury moved to Marseille, France, where he pursued a commercial education with the merchant Isaac Tarteiron. He went to London in 1730, at the behest of his father, where he was hired by John Gore, director of the South Sea Company, trading imported goods from African and American ports. The South Sea Company was active in the Atlantic slave trade. His success as a businessman in the company led to him become a British subject. In 1736, Pury settled in Lisbon, Portugal, where he supported British influence. He gained the trust of the Marquis of Pombal, Portugal's powerful secretary of state, and became an associate of Bartolomeu Miguel Viana, a Portuguese merchant active in the trade of slaves and wood from Brazil as a partner in John Dansaint & Company.

Pury, who was in London at the time, lost three fourths of his fortune in the 1755 Lisbon earthquake. He recovered his wealth after co-founding, with Joseph Mellish (John Gore's son-in-law) and Gerard Devisme, the company Purry, Mellish & Devisme. From 1757 and for the next 27 years, Pury received from King Joseph I of Portugal, with the support of the Marquis of Pombal, a near-monopoly over the import of diamonds and pau-brasil from Brazil. He also became involved in the trading of woods from the Amazon rainforest, including mahogany and jacarandá. Pury traded pau-brasil in Marseille, with his old master Isaac Tarteiron, and in other European ports such as Genoa and Le Havre.

Pury also invested part of his fortune in the triangular trade with large shares in the Companhia Geral de Comércio de Pernambuco e Paraíba, founded by the Marquis of Pombal, which transported slaves from Africa (Guinea, Angola, Cape Verde) to Northeastern Brazil (Maranhão, Pernambuco, Paraíba). In 1762, Pury was appointed a banker to Joseph I. In 1785 he was made a baron by King Frederick II of Prussia, who was also Prince of Neuchâtel. Pury died on 31 May 1786 in Lisbon, aged 77. He is buried at the British Cemetery in Lisbon.

Pury made numerous donations to the city of Neuchâtel throughout his life. He never married or had any children. On his death, he bequeathed by will most of his fortune to his hometown, half of which was to be invested in charitable works and the other half in the construction of public buildings. Pury's inheritance to Neuchâtel was 2,250,000 livres tournois, the equivalent of 600 million Swiss francs in 2020. This massive sum was used to repair buildings and churches, fund the construction of the town hall, establish local charities, build a public library, schools, hospitals, and in urban development projects such as the diversion of the Seyon river.

== Legacy and controversy ==
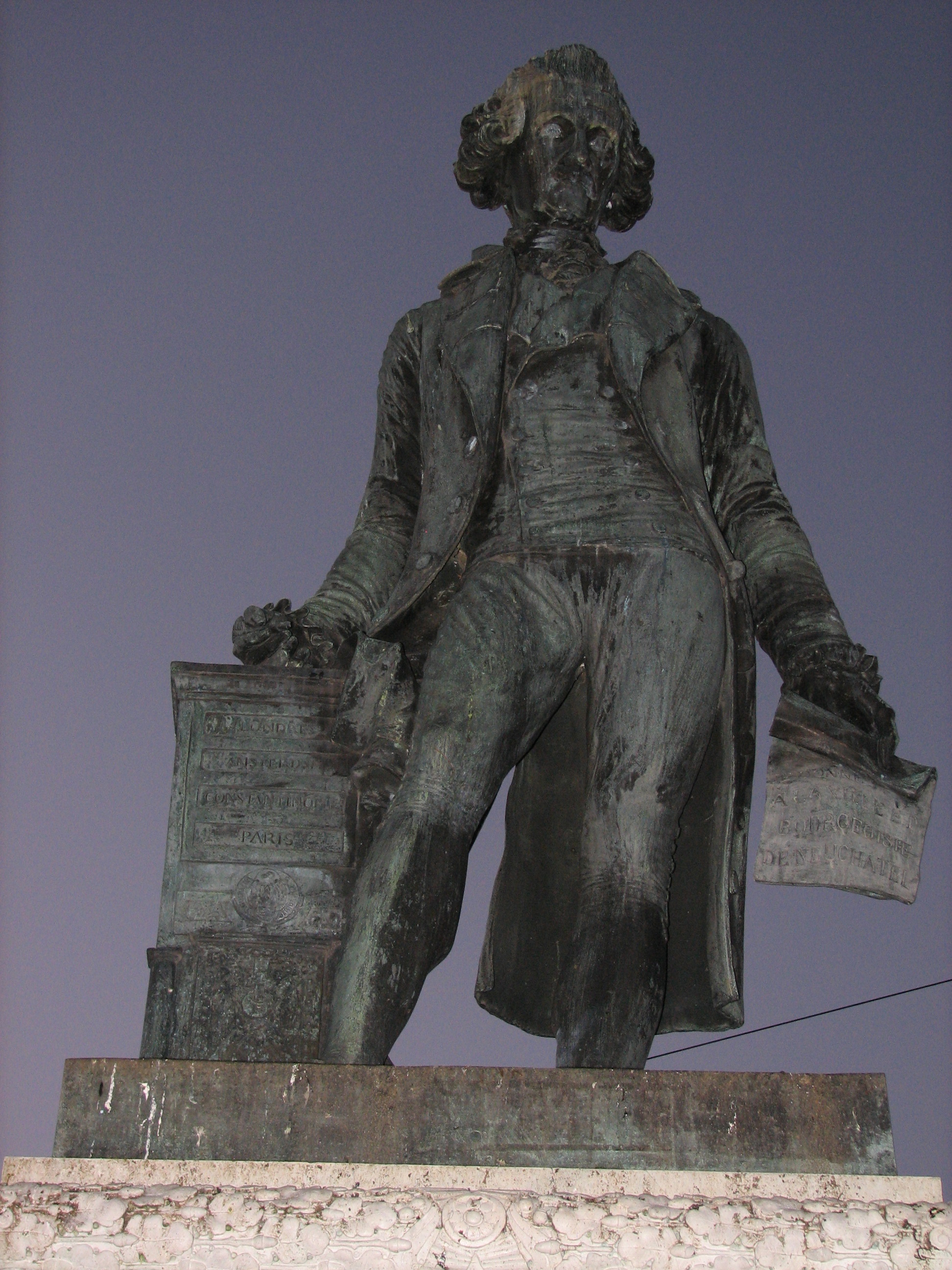
The Bronze statue of David de Pury in Neuchâtel, sculpted by David d'Angers, has been a source of debate in Switzerland.

A portrait of Pury, painted by Thomas Hickey, hangs in the charter room in the town hall of Neuchâtel. After developing several projects, a citizens' committee decided to erect a bronze statue of Pury in 1855. The statue, designed by David d'Angers, stands in an eponymous town square (Place Pury) in Neuchâtel. In 1986, on the occasion of the bicentenary of Pury's death, festivities were organized in Neuchâtel in the presence of American and Portuguese delegations.

In June 2020 the Collectif Pour La Mémoire petitioned to have the statue in Neuchâtel removed since the majority of his wealth came from investments and holdings in industries that depended on forced labor of enslaved African people, inspired by the numerous monuments removed following the murder of George Floyd in the United States. The Collectif Pour La Mémoire stated in their petition, signed by over 2,000 people, that "the money inherited by David de Pury, at his death in 1786, was used to carry out a large number of works in the town of Neuchâtel but it was won by the blood of black people from Africa forced into slavery in the 18th century. It is our responsibility to challenge this legacy and refuse to allow anyone who has contributed to the suffering of more than 55,000 slaves to be seen as a benefactor." They also asked that a plaque commemorating those who suffered from racism and white supremacy replace the statue. By 13 July 2020 the petition had been signed by over 2,500 people.

The petition was criticized by Nicolas de Pury, a member of the Pury family and elected representative of the Green Party to the General Council of Neuchâtel. He suggested that more historical research be done on his ancestor, and include his history with slavery on a plaque under the statue. Pury also called for allocating funds to a historian to "shed light" on Pury's entire life.

Late in the night on 12 July 2020 the statue of Pury was vandalized by protesters. Red paint, symbolizing blood of enslaved Africans, was smeared across the statue. An email was sent to ArcInfo by the group responsible titled A Monument for Those Resisting Colonialism, Not for Slavers. The statue was cleaned the following morning.

In 2021, the authorities in Neuchâtel opted to install a plaque and launched an artistic contest to create a work that interacted with the statue and its past. Mathias Pfund's sculpture Great in the Concrete, selected by an international jury, was unveiled in 2022. An audiovisual installation by Nathan Solioz was also projected for a month in front of the statue in 2024.
