= Meliha =

Turkish given name

- Gender: Female

Origin
- Origin: Arabic
- Meaning: "Beautiful, graceful, elegant"
- Region of origin: Turkey, Bosnia and Herzegovina

Other names
- Related names: Melih (m.)

Meliha is a female Turkish given name of Arabic origin, meaning "beautiful", "graceful", and "elegant". Its male equivalent is Melih.

Notable people with the name include:

- Meliha İsmailoğlu (born 1993), Bosnian-Turkish volleyball player
- Meliha Ulaş (1901–1942), Turkish politician

== See also ==
- Melihate Ajeti (1935–2005), Albanian Kosovar actress
- Mellieħa, a town in Northern Region, Malta
