= Joshua Vanneck =

Joshua Vanneck may refer to:

- Joshua Vanneck, 1st Baron Huntingfield (1745–1816), British merchant and politician
- Joshua Vanneck, 2nd Baron Huntingfield (1778–1844), British peer and politician
- Sir Joshua Vanneck, 1st Baronet (1702–1777), British-Dutch merchant
