= Alberto Melis =

Italian footballer (born 1993)

Personal information
- Date of birth: 18 January 1993 (age 33)
- Place of birth: Quartu Sant'Elena, Italy
- Height: 1.94 m (6 ft 4 in)
- Position: Midfielder

Youth career
- 2010–2014: Cagliari

Senior career*
| Years | Team | Apps | (Gls) |
| 2012–2013 | → Savona (loan) | 6 | (1) |
| 2013–2014 | → Pisa (loan) | 3 | (0) |
| 2014–2015 | Cagliari | 0 | (0) |
| 2014 | → Aprilia (loan) | 5 | (0) |
| 2015–2016 | Agropoli | 35 | (1) |
| 2017 | Grosseto | 1 | (0) |
| 2017 | Nuorese | 3 | (0) |
| 2018 | AD Valdinievole Montecatini | 6 | (1) |
| 2018–2019 | US Tortolì Calcio 1953 | | |

International career
| 2009 | Italy U16 | 2 | (0) |
- * Club domestic league appearances and goals as of 9 February 2026

Alberto Melis (born 18 January 1993) is an Italian footballer who plays as a midfielder.
