= Melissus =

Melissus may refer to:

== People ==
- Melissus of Samos (fl. c. 500 BC), Greek philosopher
- Melissus of Thebes, Greek athlete contrasted to Orion by Pindar
- Gaius Maecenas Melissus (fl. early 1st century AD), Roman writer
- Paulus Melissus (1539–1602), humanist Neo-Latin writer, translator and composer

== Mythological figures ==
- Melisseus (or Melissus), father of the nymphs Adrasteia and Ida, the nurses of Zeus on Crete
- Melissus, father of Actaeon - see Archias of Corinth

== See also ==
- Melissaeus
- Melisseus
