= Melih =

- Gender: Male

Origin
- Origin: Arabic
- Meaning: "Beautiful, handsome"
- Region of origin: Turkey

Other names
- Related names: Meliha (f.)

Melih is a male Turkish given name of Arabic origin, meaning "handsome" and "beautiful". Its feminine equivalent is Meliha.

Notable people with the name include:

- Melih Abdulhayoğlu (born 1968), Turkish-American entrepreneur
- Melih Bostan (born 2004), Turkish footballer
- Melih Bulu (born 1970), Turkish academic and politician
- Melih Cevdet Anday (1915–2002), Turkish poet and writer
- Melih Ekener (born 1965), Turkish-Armenian actor
- Melih Esenbel (1915–1995), Turkish diplomat and Minister of Foreign Affairs
- Melih Gökçek (born 1948), Turkish politician
- Melih Gökçek (footballer) (born 1981), Brazilian-born Turkish footballer
- Melih Kabasakal (born 1996), Turkish footballer
- Melih Kibar (1951–2005), Turkish composer
- Melih Kotanca (1915–1986), Turkish footballer and track and field athlete
- Melih Mahmutoğlu (born 1990), Turkish basketball player
- Melih Okutan (born 1996), Turkish footballer
- Melih Onuş (1981–2020), Turkish mathematician, computer engineer and scientist
- Melih Sıratça (born 1996), Turkish volleyball player
- Melih Turgut (born 1997), Turkish badminton player
- Melih Ulueren (born 1955), Turkish diplomat
- Melih Uzunyol (1956–1996) Turkish cameraman and victim of the 1996 Centennial Olympic Park bombing
- Ahmet Melih Yılmaz (born 1989), Turkish actor
- Vahit Melih Halefoğlu (1919–2017), Turkish politician and diplomat

== Last name ==
- Amel Melih (born 1993), Algerian swimmer
