= C/1917 F1 (Mellish) =

Halley-type comet

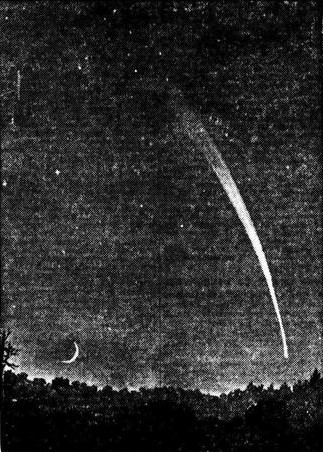
- The comet on 20 April 1917, as seen from Australia

Discovery
- Discovered by: John E. Mellish
- Discovery date: 19 March 1917

Designations
- Alternative designations: 1917 I, 1917a

Orbital characteristics
- Epoch: 31 March 1917 (JD 2421318.5)
- Observation arc: 38 days – 1,724 years
- Earliest precovery date: December 193 AD?
- Number of observations: 11
- Orbit type: Halley-type
- Aphelion: 54.61 AU
- Perihelion: 0.190 AU
- Semi-major axis: 27.398 AU
- Eccentricity: 0.9931
- Orbital period: 143.416 years
- Inclination: 32.687°
- Longitude of ascending node: 88.675°
- Argument of periapsis: 121.314°
- Last perihelion: 11 April 1917
- Next perihelion: ~2060
- T_{Jupiter}: 0.644
- Earth MOID: 0.0618 AU
- Jupiter MOID: 1.5342 AU
- Comet total magnitude (M1): 11.0

C/1917 F1 (Mellish), also known as Comet 1917Ι and 1917a, is a Halley-type comet discovered by John E. Mellish on 19 March 1917. The comet has an orbital period of 143 years and last passed perihelion on 11 April 1917. It is the parent body of the December Monocerotids and has also been suggested to be the parent body of daytime kappa Leonids, April ρ-Cygnids, November Orionids, and Canis-Minorids meteor showers.

== Discovery and observations ==
The comet upon discovery was in the constellation of Aries and it was located low in the sky and was very condensed. On 23 March a short tail was reported. After perihelion, on 11 April, the comet nucleus was reported to be very bright on 14 April, with a report mentioning it was brighter than Venus, while it developed a tail that measured 10 degrees in length. The comet faded quickly and by the end of April it was of 5th magnitude and the comet's tail was three degrees long.

== Orbit ==
The comet has an orbital period of about 145 years, and thus fits the definition of Halley-type comets, which have an orbital period between 20 and 200 years. Its orbital period is similar to comet Swift-Tuttle, the parent body of the Perseids. The comet has a relatively small perihelion distance, about 0.19 AU (28 million km; 18 million mi). The minimum orbit intersection distance with Earth is 0.06 AU (9.0 million km; 5.6 million mi) while the same distance from Venus is 0.0084 AU (1.26 million km; 0.78 million mi), and could create a meteor shower in Venus.

In 1979, Ichiro Hasegawa tentatively identified a comet observed in December 193 CE as a previous apparition of C/1917 F1 (Mellish).
