= 26P/Grigg–Skjellerup =

Periodic comet

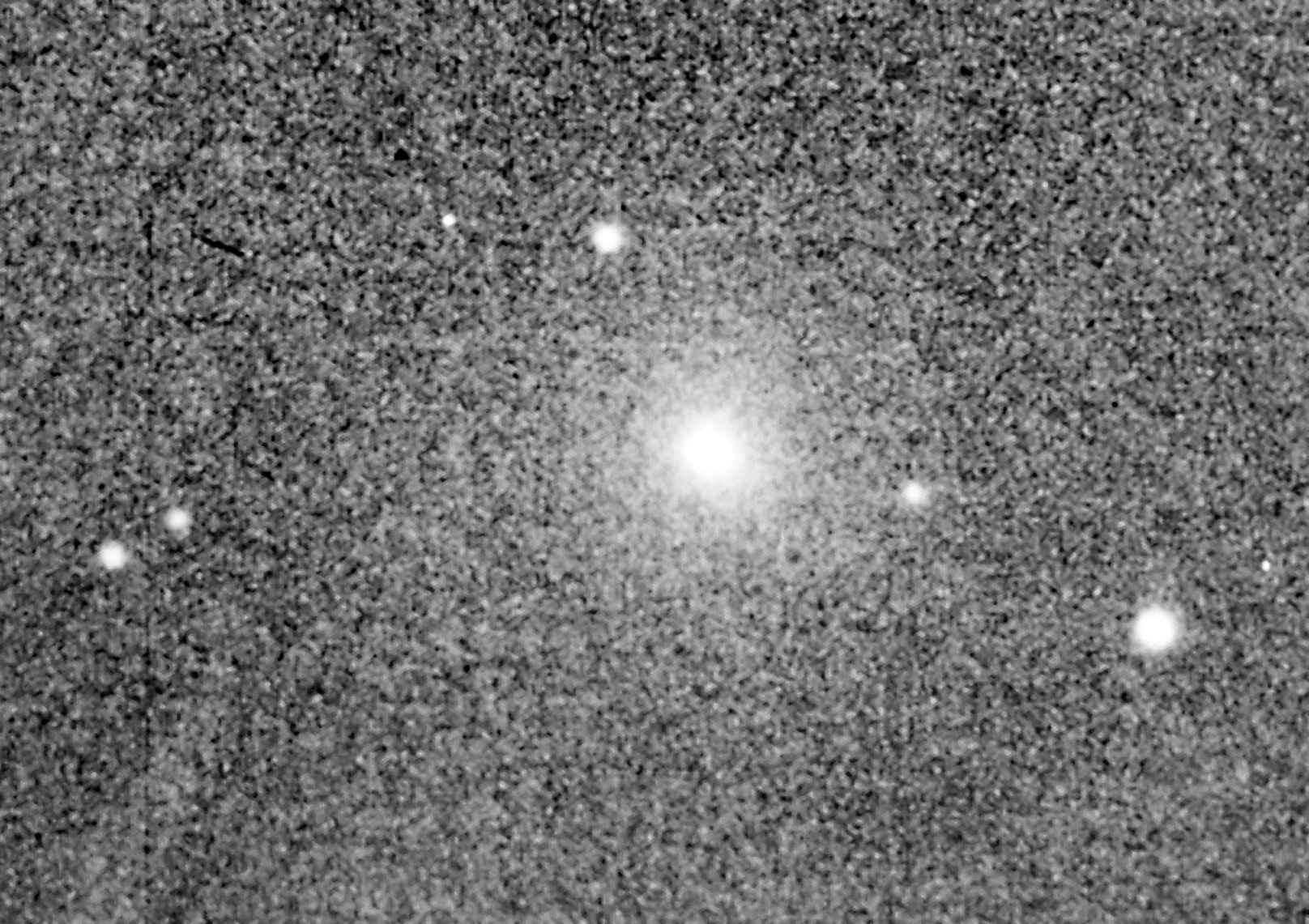
- Comet Grigg–Skjellerup photographed from the European Southern Observatory on 29 June 1992

Discovery
- Discovered by: John Grigg; John Francis Skjellerup
- Discovery date: 23 July 1902; 17 May 1922

Designations
- MPC designation: P/1808 C1, P/1902 O1; P/1922 K1, P/1927 F1
- Pronunciation: /ˈɡrɪɡ ˈskɛlərʌp/
- Alternative designations: 1808 III, 1902 II, 1922 I; 1927 V, 1932 II, 1937 III; 1942 V, 1947 II, 1952 IV; 1957 I, 1961 IX, 1967 I; 1972 II, 1977 VI, 1982 IV; 1987 X, 1992 XVIII

Orbital characteristics
- Epoch: 17 October 2024 (JD 2460600.5)
- Observation arc: 216.67 years
- Earliest precovery date: 6 February 1808
- Number of observations: 827
- Aphelion: 4.947 AU
- Perihelion: 1.084 AU
- Semi-major axis: 3.015 AU
- Eccentricity: 0.64056
- Orbital period: 5.236 years
- Max. orbital speed: 36.6 km/s
- Inclination: 22.433°
- Longitude of ascending node: 211.54°
- Argument of periapsis: 2.136°
- Mean anomaly: 55.845°
- Last perihelion: 25 December 2023
- Next perihelion: 18 March 2029
- T_{Jupiter}: 2.804
- Earth MOID: 0.085 AU
- Jupiter MOID: 0.006 AU

Physical characteristics
- Mean radius: 1.3 km (0.81 mi)
- Synodic rotation period: 12 hours
- Spectral type: (V–R) = 0.42±0.10
- Comet total magnitude (M1): 16.5

Comet Grigg–Skjellerup (formally designated 26P/Grigg–Skjellerup) is a periodic comet. It was visited by the Giotto probe in July 1992. The spacecraft came as close as 200 km, but could not take pictures because some instruments were damaged from its encounter with Halley's Comet. The comet last came to perihelion (closest approach to the Sun) on 25 December 2023, but was 1.8 AU from Earth and only 31 degrees from the Sun.

== Observational history ==
The comet was discovered in 1902 by John Grigg of New Zealand, and rediscovered in its next appearance in 1922 by John Francis Skjellerup, an Australian then living and working for about two decades in South Africa where he was a founder member of the Astronomical Society of Southern Africa. In 1987, it was belatedly discovered by Ľubor Kresák that the comet had been observed in 1808 as well, by Jean-Louis Pons. Pons observed the comet on 6 and 9 February, which was insufficient to calculate an approximate orbit.

In 1972 the comet was discovered to produce a meteor shower, the Pi Puppids, and its current orbit makes them peak around 23 April, for observers in the southern hemisphere, best seen when the comet is near perihelion.

During the comet's 1982 approach it was detected using radar by the Arecibo Observatory.

The apparition of 2002 was very unfavorable due to solar conjunctions, thus no observations were conducted at that time.

== Orbit ==
The comet has often suffered the gravitational influence of Jupiter, which has altered its orbit considerably. For instance, its perihelion distance has changed from 0.77 AU in 1725 to 0.89 AU in 1922 to 0.99 AU in 1977 and to 1.12 AU in 1999.

== Physical characteristics ==
The comet nucleus is estimated to be 2.6 km (1.6 mi) in diameter. Light-curve analysis from the Giotto flyby in 1992 revealed that Grigg–Skjellerup is surprisingly an old comet compared to 1P/Halley, suggesting that 26P is estimated to be around 89 comet-years in age. Ground-based photometry of the comet reveal a non-spherical nucleus with a rotation period longer than 12 hours.

The comet is a type locality for the mineral brownleeite.

== Exploration ==
In 1987, Grigg–Skjellerup was selected as the second comet targeted by the Giotto mission due to its perihelion in 1992 occurring very close to the Earth's orbit itself.

By February 1990, the mission control at the European Space Agency reactivated the spacecraft after four years of hibernation following the Halley mission, subsequently executing the first ever Earth flyby in space exploration history to reach 26P on July 1990. Giotto reached Grigg–Skjellerup on 10 July 1992 at a distance of 200 km (120 mi), much closer than its approach to Halley's Comet, but was unable to obtain images as its camera was destroyed during the Halley rendezvous in 1986. Despite this, the spacecraft was able to measure the interaction of the solar wind and how it affects the coma of this comet.

Giotto was deactivated just 13 days after its flyby of Grigg–Skjellerup on 23 July 1992.

=== Cancelled proposals ===
In 1972, a NASA spacecraft mission based from the Explorer 47/50 satellite called Cometary Explorer was proposed to intercept Grigg–Skjellerup at a distance of 1,000 km (620 mi) by April 1977, with an option to flyby 21P/Giacobini–Zinner on a potential mission extension in 1979. This would serve as a precursor mission for an eventual mission to Halley in 1986, however it was rejected due to budget cuts.

== Popular culture ==
- In Neal Stephenson's science fiction novel Seveneves, 26P/Grigg–Skjellerup serves as a potential source of water and rocket propellant for the "Cloud Ark" survivors, and is frequently referred to by the nickname "Greg's Skeleton" by way of homophonic transformation.

== See also ==
- List of minor planets and comets visited by spacecraft

Numbered comets
Previous; 25D/Neujmin	26P/Grigg–Skjellerup	Next; 27P/Crommelin
