= Arthur Preston Mellish =

Canadian mathematician

- Born: June 10, 1905; Canada
- Died: February 7, 1930 (aged 24)
- Education: University of British Columbia (M.A., 1928)
- Known for: Generalization of Barbier's theorem
- Scientific career
- Fields: Mathematics
- Workplaces: Brown University
- Thesis: An illustrative example of the ellipsoid pendulum (1928)

Arthur Preston Mellish (10 June 1905 – 7 February 1930) was a Canadian mathematician, known for his generalization of Barbier's theorem.

Arthur Mellish received in 1928 an M.A. in mathematics from the University of British Columbia with thesis An illustrative example of the ellipsoid pendulum. He died at age 24 and had no mathematical publications during his lifetime. After his death, his colleagues at Brown University examined his notes on mathematics. Jacob Tamarkin prepared a paper based upon the notes and published it in the Annals of Mathematics in 1931.

In the statement of the following theorem, an oval means a closed convex curve.

Mellish's Theorem: The statements

- (i) a curve is of constant width;
- (ii) a curve is of constant diameter;
- (iii) all the normals of a curve (an oval) are double;
- (iv) the sum of radii of curvature at opposite points of a curve (an oval) is constant;

are equivalent, in the sense that whenever one of statements (i–iv) is true, all other statements also hold.

- (v) All curves of the same (constant) width a have the same length L given by L = πa.
