= Joseph Mellish =

Joseph Mellish (c. 1717 – 7 December 1790) was a British Member of Parliament. He was born around 1717 into an established London merchant family, the third son of Joseph Mellish of Blyth Hall, Nottinghamshire, and Dorothy Gore, daughter of Sir William Gore, Lord Mayor of London.

== Family ==
He was the third son of Joseph Mellish of Doncaster and Blyth Hall, Nottinghamshire. An elder brother was William Mellish, MP for East Retford. He married his cousin Catherine Gore, the daughter of John Gore, MP of Bush Hill, Middlesex.

== Business ==
Joseph Mellish worked in the banking house of his father in law, John Gore, in Bishopsgate Street. Mellish entered business in Bishopsgate Street in partnership with John Gore. The business was active in banking and international finance. Gore later became his father in law.

In 1759, Mellish, together with Samuel Touchet and Thomas Walpole, obtained government contracts for remitting money to Germany during the Seven Years' War.

Although not a long term holder of government securities, Mellish subscribed £150,000 to a £12 million government loan in 1762 and was consulted by the Duke of Newcastle on Treasury matters.

He was also the owner of the company Purry, Mellish and Devisme with his associates David de Purry and Gérard DeVisme. The company was active in the trade of textiles, Brazilwood and sugar as part of the Triangular trade between Brazil, Portugal and Angola. His company worked directly with the Portuguese monopolistic companies established by the Marquis de Pombal, namely the Companhia Geral de Pernambuco e Paraíba and the Companhia Geral do Grão-Pará e do Maranhão.

== Politics ==
He was himself elected MP for Great Grimsby from 1761 to 1780. In 1761 Mellish was returned unopposed as Member of Parliament for Great Grimsby, succeeding his father in law John Gore, and continued to represent the constituency until 1780.^{,} Although not recorded as having spoken in Parliament, Mellish voted regularly and was variously classified during his career as a supporter of the Newcastle, Rockingham and Chatham administrations.
