= Mellish Road Methodist Chapel =

- Interactive map of the Mellish Road Methodist Chapel area

General information
- Status: Demolished
- Type: Methodist chapel
- Architectural style: Gothic
- Location: Walsall, England
- Coordinates: 52.59268°N 1.97216°W
- Completed: 1910
- Demolished: 2011
- Cost: £3,600

Design and construction
- Designations: Grade II listed

Mellish Road Methodist Chapel was a grade II listed Methodist chapel in Mellish Road, Walsall, England, built in 1910.

The building was of limestone ashlar, with some exposed brick, and cost £3,600.

In the 1990s, subsidence caused by the flooding of disused mine-workings beneath the chapel caused a significant crack to appear in its walls. It was declared unsafe and abandoned. An arson attack in 2008 further weakened it, and – after being de-listed – it was demolished in 2011.

During demolition, its 50 feet (15 m) octagonal limestone spire was carefully dismantled and later, in 2015, offered for sale, with the initial asking price of £130,000.

The chapel's records are in the Walsall Local History Centre.
