= Purrysburg, South Carolina =

Coordinates: 32°17′51″N 81°7′9″W

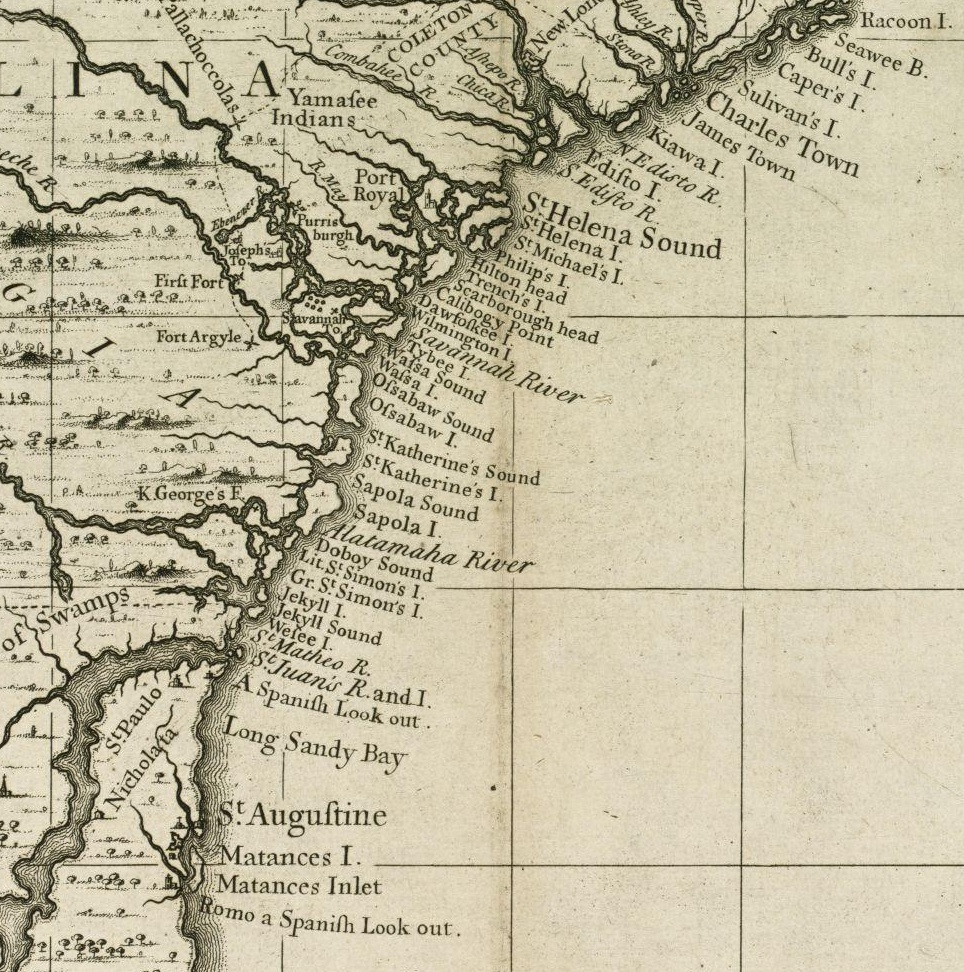
"Purrisburgh" on a 1733 map of the Georgia and South Carolina coast

Purrysburg is an unincorporated community in Jasper County, South Carolina. While the town itself was abandoned, the settlers were successful. The town was located on the South Carolina bank of the Savannah River on 40,000 acres.

Purrysburg (also spelled Purysburg, Purrysburgh, Purysburgh, Purisburg, Purisbourg) was named after Jean-Pierre Purry, of the De Pury family from Neuchâtel which during this time did not belong to Switzerland as it does today, but to the King of Prussia. Purry, a man using slave labor, led the first settlers there in 1731. Pury initially presented his plan to the Duke of Newcastle as a representative of the Lord Proprietors, but roused no interest. But by the time Robert Johnson became Royal Governor in 1729, it fit very nicely with his needs and instructions. He was trying to strengthen and expand frontier settlement by any European Protestants to block French and Spanish expansion.

By 1736, there were 100 houses and as many as 450 settlers in the new town. The settlers were primarily French and German speaking Swiss Protestants from Neuchâtel and Geneva. At its peak the town likely had fewer than 600 residents. But the settlement suffered from disease and an unhealthy atmosphere. The settlers also had difficulties due to overlapping land grants. Over the next few decades many of them moved on to other towns in South Carolina, or the newly developing Georgia.

Archaeological exploration at Purrysburg includes studies in the 1980s by LePionka, Elliott and Smith. More recently the townsite was explored by archaeologists with the LAMAR Institute for its Revolutionary War battlefield.

As of 2010, descendents of the American De Pury family live in Tampa, and Pensacola Florida.
