= C/1907 G1 (Grigg–Mellish) =

Long-period comet

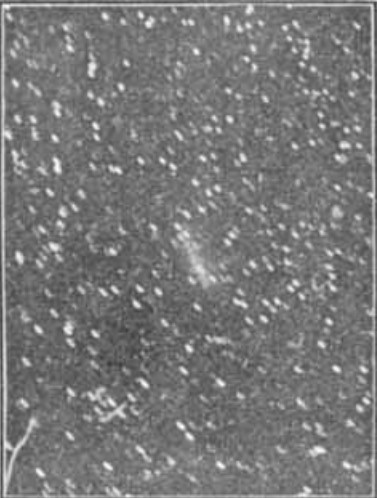
- Comet Grigg–Mellish photographed by Edward Emerson Barnard on 13 April 1907

Discovery
- Discovered by: John E. Mellish; John Grigg
- Discovery date: 8 April 1907

Designations
- Alternative designations: 1907 II, 1907b

Orbital characteristics
- Epoch: 18 April 1907 (JD 2417683.5)
- Observation arc: 37 days
- Number of observations: 4
- Aphelion: 123.9 AU
- Perihelion: 0.924 AU
- Semi-major axis: 62.43 AU
- Eccentricity: 0.985205
- Orbital period: ~490 years
- Inclination: 109.95°
- Longitude of ascending node: 190.47°
- Argument of periapsis: 328.60°
- Last perihelion: 27 March 1907
- Next perihelion: ~2400
- T_{Jupiter}: -0.322
- Earth MOID: 0.003 AU
- Jupiter MOID: 1.351 AU
- Comet total magnitude (M1): 10.0

C/1907 G1 (Grigg–Mellish) is a long-period comet discovered independently by John Grigg and John E. Mellish in April 1907. The comet has been identified as the parent body of the delta Pavonids meteor shower.

== Discovery and observations ==
John Grigg, in New Zealand, discovered a nebulous object near the star α Cae on 8 April 1907, however the discovery wasn't communicated quickly enough for observers in the southern hemisphere to confirm the discovery. The comet was found independently by amateur astronomer John E. Mellish, from Madison, Wisconsin, on 14 April. The comet had an apparent magnitude of 11 upon discovery. The comet was also spotted by Edward Emerson Barnard in a photographic plate exposed on 13 April while he was searching for comet C/1907 E1 (Giacobini). The comet formed a trail 13.6 arcminutes long during the one hour the plate was exposed. The comet was reported to have a coma two arcminutes across and a broad tail 8 arcminutes long on 16 April. The comet faded rapidly and it was difficult to measure with the 36-inch telescope of Lick Observatory on 7 May.

The comet was found to have a similar orbit to comet C/1742 C1, however comet Grigg–Mellish is intrinsically fainter than that comet. The comet's orbit passes very close to Earth, at a distance of 0.003 AU (450,000 km; 280,000 mi); Earth passes that point on 30 March. Due to the small minimum orbit intersection distance, it was suggested to be a source of meteors with a radiant point at R.A. = 20.63^{h} , DEC = –60.4° and a speed of Vg = 59.0 km/s.

== Meteor shower ==
Comet Grigg–Mellish has been identified as the parent body of the delta Pavonids meteor shower. The shower has a zenithal hourly rate (ZHR) of 5 meteors per hour and peaks at March 31. An outburst was observed in 2019. The orbit of the meteors indicates that comet has an orbital period of 447±80 years.
