= John E. Mellish =

American astronomer and telescope builder (1886–1970)

John Edward Mellish
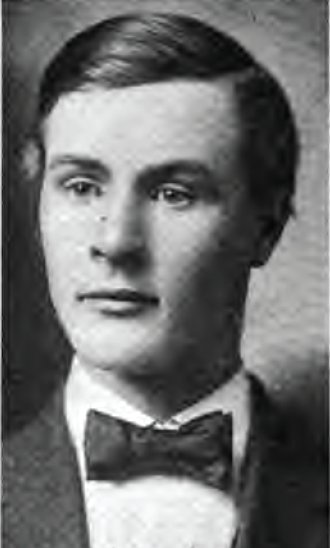
- John E. Mellish circa 1910
- Born: January 12, 1886; Madison, Wisconsin
- Died: July 13, 1970 (aged 84); Medford, Oregon
- Occupations: Astronomer; Telescope builder
- Known for: Discovery of comets
- Parents: Arthur Mellish (father); Judith Sedora S. Mellish (mother)

John Edward Mellish (12 January 1886 – 13 July 1970, Medford, Oregon) was an American amateur astronomer and telescope builder.

== Biography ==
Mellish was born in Wisconsin, the son of Arthur Mellish (1862–1928) and Judith Sedora Stimson Mellish (1864–1954). Arthur was the son of an English clergyman who moved to the US. He later abandoned the family and worked as a railway crossing guard. Mellish grew up outside of Madison, Wisconsin in Cottage Grove. He taught himself and helped in farming. He completed the normal school curriculum of four years in just two. At 14 he bought a small Bardou refractor and then decided to build a larger telescope based on instructions in the Scientific American by George Willis Ritchey. By age 24 he was credited with discovering or co-discovering two comets: C/1907 G1 (Grigg–Mellish) and C/1907 T1 (Mellish) using home built telescopes, and received astronomical medals from both the United States and Mexico as a result. He later discovered another three comets: C/1915 C1 (Mellish), C/1915 R1 (Mellish), and C/1917 F1 (Mellish).

Mellish wrote to Popular Mechanics about his telescope and wrote that he was open to help anyone else build one. This resulted in a flood of correspondence. By 1908, he had handled 300 letters. He also established a correspondence with A. R. Hassard of Toronto.

In November 1915 he announced to have observed craters on Mars, and being the second person to do so after E. E. Barnard. Both claims are disputed to this day, but he is still credited to be the first human to recognize craters on Mars using the great 40-inch Yerkes refractor.

John E. Mellish, 1925

A crater on Mars (Mellish) was named in his honor.

In 1931, Mellish confessed to committing incest with his 15-year-old daughter. Astronomers advocated that he be spared jail time because of his value to science, and it was proposed that he be sterilized. Mellish was held in the Kane County Jail from September 1931 to April 1933, when he was paroled, and he moved to California. His wife divorced him in May 1933 and was given custody of their eight children.

After living in Escondido, California from 1933 to 1936, Mellish relocated to a ranch at Broken Arrow, Oklahoma. However he returned to Escondido, where he and his son were arrested in 1938 on charges involving two juvenile girls. Mellish died in Medford, Oregon, in 1970.

== See also ==
- Sherzer Observatory
