= C/1915 C1 (Mellish) =

Hyperbolic comet

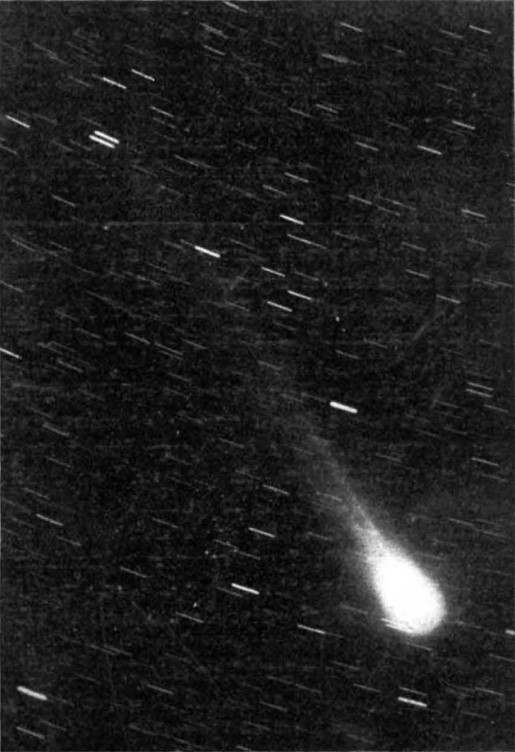
- Comet Mellish photographed by Harry E. Wood from the Union Observatory in June 1915

Discovery
- Discovered by: John E. Mellish
- Discovery date: 10 February 1915

Designations
- Alternative designations: 1915a 1915 II

Orbital characteristics
- Epoch: 30 June 1915 (JD 2420678.5)
- Observation arc: 376 days (1.03 years)
- Number of observations: 94
- Perihelion: 1.0053 AU
- Eccentricity: 1.00027
- Inclination: 54.792°
- Longitude of ascending node: 73.453°
- Argument of periapsis: 247.782°
- Last perihelion: 17 July 1915
- Earth MOID: 0.3339 AU
- Jupiter MOID: 0.9970 AU

Physical characteristics
- Mean radius: 2.07 km (1.29 mi) (Note: Calculated mean radius using the formula: $\log_{10}\,(\,R\,)\ =\;0.9 +\;0.13 (\,H\,)$ Where $\,H\,$ is the comet's absolute total magnitude (M1))
- Comet total magnitude (M1): 4.5

Comet Mellish, also known formally as C/1915 C1, is one of five comets discovered by American astronomer John E. Mellish. It is a hyperbolic comet that reached perihelion on 17 July 1915. However, just two months earlier, Edward E. Barnard had reported the comet had split into three distinct objects on 12 May, later increasing to four by 24 May. In addition, it is thought that this comet was the parent body of the June Lyrids meteor shower, which was first discovered in 1966.
