= John Mellis =

- Born: 16th century
- Occupation: Author

John Mellis lived in the 16th century. Along with James Peele and John Dee, Mellis is one of the first authors who contributed to the accounting literature.

Mellis is not the real owner of the book A Briefe Instruction, and maner, how to keepe bookes of Accounts (1588). However, Mellis revised and reissued this book whose original compiler was Hugh Oldcastle. Hugh Oldcastle was said to be a compiler because this accounting book is the translation of Luca Paccioli's Summa de Arithmetica, Geometria, Proportioni et Proportionalita (Venice, 1494). But Oldcastle translated the aforesaid book in 1543 but later it was lost. In Edwin Cannan's article 'the Early History of the Term capital,(1921), Mellis is considered one of the first authors who used the term capital in the sense of stock. Although, the name appears as Mellin instead of Mellis, Cannan's mistake stems from W. R. Scott's misspelling of the name in his book 'Constitution and Finance of English, Scottish and Irish Joint Stock Companies to 1720
