= John Grigg (astronomer) =

New Zealand astronomer

John Grigg (4 June 1838 – 20 June 1920) was a New Zealand astronomer.

He was born in London and married Emma Mitchell in 1858. In 1863 they emigrated to New Zealand and settled in Auckland, however Emma died in 1867. Grigg then moved to the town of Thames. During this time he was seller of musical instruments, piano tuner, music teacher, and conductor.

He married his second wife Sarah Allaway in 1871 but she died in 1874. He later married his third wife, Jane Henderson, in 1887. In all, he had six sons and three daughters by his three wives.

The 1874 transit of Venus awakened his interest in astronomy, which he pursued full-time starting in 1894. He began systematic searches for comets in that year.

He is best known for his co-discovery of the periodic comet 26P/Grigg–Skjellerup in 1902, which was his first discovery of a new comet.
