= Enges =

- Former municipality
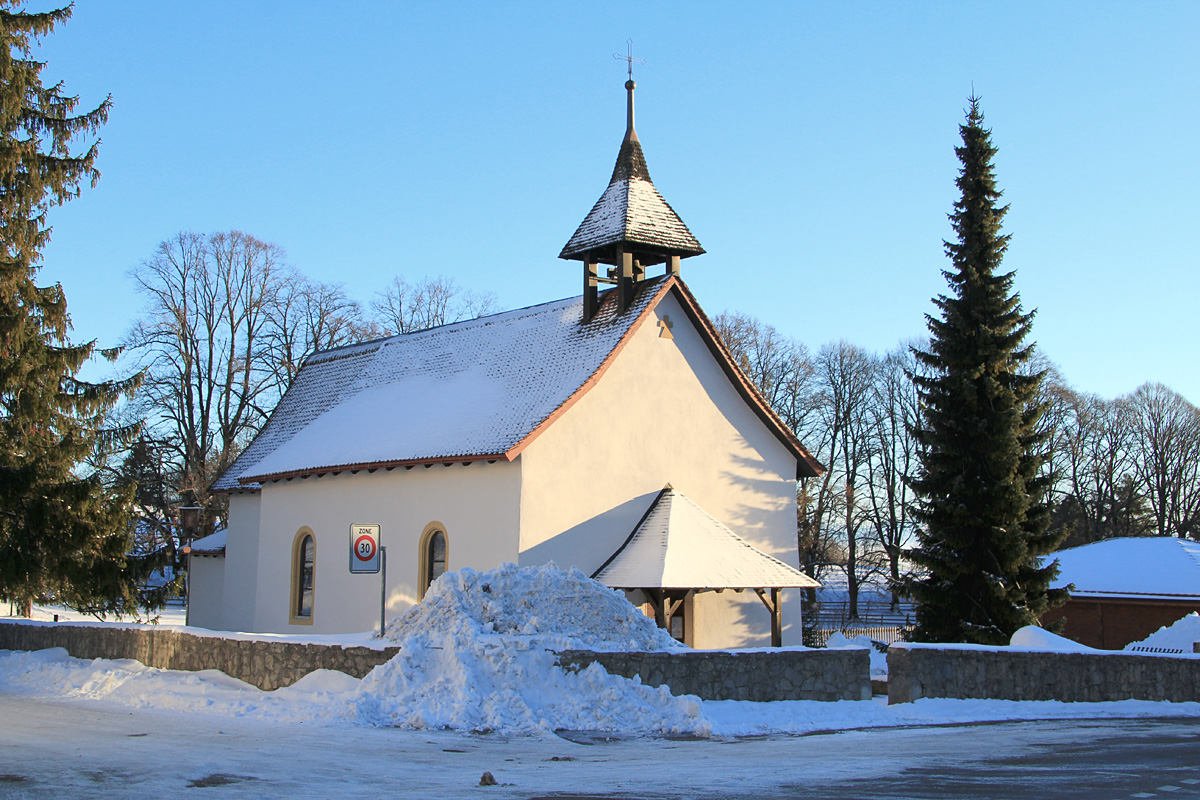
- Chapel in Enges

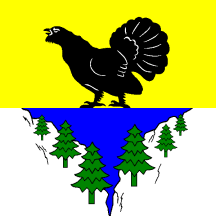
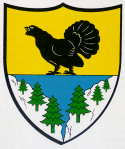
- Flag Coat of arms
- Location of Enges
- Location within Switzerland Location within Canton of Neuchâtel
- Coordinates: 47°4′N 7°1′E
- Country: Switzerland
- Canton: Neuchâtel

Area
  - Total: 9.59 km^{2} (3.70 sq mi)
- Elevation: 816 m (2,677 ft)

Population (December 2007)
  - Total: 287
  - Density: 29.9/km^{2} (77.5/sq mi)
- Time zone: UTC+01:00 (CET)
  - Summer (DST): UTC+02:00 (CEST)
- Postal code: 2073
- SFOS number: 6453
- ISO 3166 code: CH-NE
- Surrounded by: Cressier, Le Landeron, Lignières, Neuchâtel, Saint-Blaise, Savagnier, Villiers
- Website: www.enges.ch

Enges is a former municipality in the Swiss canton of Neuchâtel. On 1 January 2025 the former municipalities of Enges, Hauterive, Saint-Blaise and La Tène merged into the new municipality of Laténa.

== History ==
Enges is first mentioned in 1178 as en Enge. In 1212, it was mentioned as Einge.

== Geography ==
Enges has an area, as of 2009, of 9.6 square kilometers (3.7 mi^{2}). Of this area, 4.38 km^{2} (1.69 mi^{2}), or 45.7%, is used for agricultural purposes, while 4.95 km^{2} (1.91 mi^{2}), or 51.6%, is forested. Of the remaining land, 0.21 km^{2} (0.081 mi^{2}), or 2.2%, is settled (buildings or roads).

Housing and buildings make up 0.8%, and transportation infrastructure make up 1.1%. Out of the forested land, 48.8% of the total land area is heavily forested and 2.8% is covered with orchards or small clusters of trees and the agricultural land, 15.3%, is used for growing crops while 23.4% is pastures and 6.9% is alpine pastures.

The municipality consists of the hamlet of Lordel and three alpine seasonal settlements: Cressier, Enges and Grange Vallier.

It was part of the district of Neuchâtel until the district level was eliminated on 1 January 2018.

== Coat of arms ==
The blazon of the municipal coat of arms is Per fess, Or, a Grouse passant Sable, and Azure, a Gorge Argent with Pine-trees Vert.

== Demographics ==
Enges has a population (as of December 2020) of 266. As of 2008, 9.6% of the population are resident foreign nationals. Over the last 10 years (2000–2010) the population has changed at a rate of -3.1%. It has changed at a rate of -7.6% due to migration and at a rate of 8.2% due to births and deaths.

Most of the population (as of 2000) speaks French (256 or 88.6%) as their first language, German is the second most common (25 or 8.7%) and English is the third (4 or 1.4%). There are 2 people who speak Italian.

As of 2008, the population was 50.6% male and 49.4% female. The population was made up of 128 Swiss men (47.2% of the population) and 9 (3.3%) non-Swiss men. There were 122 Swiss women (45.0%) and 12 (4.4%) non-Swiss women. Of the population in the municipality, 74 or about 25.6% were born in Enges and lived there in 2000. There were 98 or 33.9% who were born in the same canton, while 80 or 27.7% were born somewhere else in Switzerland, and 37 or 12.8% were born outside of Switzerland.

As of 2000, children and teenagers (0–19 years old) make up 24.6% of the population, while adults (20–64 years old) make up 64.4% and seniors (over 64 years old) make up 11.1%.

As of 2000, there were 108 people who were single and never married in the municipality. There were 154 married individuals, 7 widows or widowers and 20 individuals who are divorced.

As of 2000, there were 110 private households in the municipality, and an average of 2.6 persons per household. There were 21 households that consist of only one person and 11 households with five or more people. In 2000, a total of 109 apartments (86.5% of the total) were permanently occupied, while 9 apartments (7.1%) were seasonally occupied and 8 apartments (6.3%) were empty. The vacancy rate for the municipality, in 2010, was 1.48%.

The historical population is given in the following chart:

== Politics ==
In the 2007 federal election the most popular party was the SP which received 26.65% of the vote. The next three most popular parties were the SVP (21.56%), the FDP (18.11%) and the Green Party (13.02%). In the federal election, a total of 139 votes were cast, and the voter turnout was 62.1%.

== Economy ==
As of 2010, Enges had an unemployment rate of 2.9%. As of 2008, there were 31 people employed in the primary economic sector and about 14 businesses involved in this sector. 1 person was employed in the secondary sector and there was 1 business in this sector. 21 people were employed in the tertiary sector, with 6 businesses in this sector. There were 156 residents of the municipality who were employed in some capacity, of which females made up 42.9% of the workforce.

In 2008 the total number of full-time equivalent jobs was 39. The number of jobs in the primary sector was 22, of which 17 were in agriculture and 4 were in forestry or lumber production. The number of jobs in the secondary sector was 1, all of which were in manufacturing. The number of jobs in the tertiary sector was 16. In the tertiary sector; 6 or 37.5% were in a hotel or restaurant, 1 was in the information industry, 2 or 12.5% were technical professionals or scientists, 3 or 18.8% were in education.

In 2000, there were 14 workers who commuted into the municipality and 120 workers who commuted away. The municipality is a net exporter of workers, with about 8.6 workers leaving the municipality for every one entering. Of the working population, 12.2% used public transportation to get to work, and 67.3% used a private car.

== Religion ==
From the 2000 census, 57 or 19.7% were Roman Catholic, while 159 or 55.0% belonged to the Swiss Reformed Church. Of the rest of the population, there was 1 member of an Orthodox church and there were 2 individuals (or about 0.69% of the population) who belonged to the Christian Catholic Church. 65 (or about 22.49% of the population) belonged to no church, are agnostic or atheist, and 5 individuals (or about 1.73% of the population) did not answer the question.

== Education ==
In Enges about 104 or (36.0%) of the population have completed non-mandatory upper secondary education, and 66 or (22.8%) have completed additional higher education (either university or a Fachhochschule). Of the 66 who completed tertiary schooling, 45.5% were Swiss men, 36.4% were Swiss women, 13.6% were non-Swiss men.

In the canton of Neuchâtel most municipalities provide two years of non-mandatory kindergarten, followed by five years of mandatory primary education. The next four years of mandatory secondary education is provided at thirteen larger secondary schools, which many students travel out of their home municipality to attend. The kindergarten in Enges is combined with Saint-Blaise. During the 2010–11 school year, there were 3 kindergarten classes with a total of 64 students between the municipalities. In the same year, there was one primary class with a total of 13 students.

As of 2000, there was one student in Enges who came from another municipality, while 39 residents attended schools outside the municipality.
