= La Tène =

La Tène may refer to:

- La Tène, Neuchâtel, a former municipality in Switzerland, part of Laténa since 2025
- La Tène culture, an Iron Age archaeological culture
- La Tène (archaeological site), the type site of the La Tène culture
