= Saint-Blaise, Switzerland =

Saint-Blaise
- Former municipality
- Flag Coat of arms
- Location of Saint-Blaise
- Location within Switzerland Location within Canton of Neuchâtel
- Coordinates: 47°1′N 6°59′E
- Country: Switzerland
- Canton: Neuchâtel

Area
  - Total: 8.87 km^{2} (3.42 sq mi)
- Elevation: 440 m (1,440 ft)

Population (December 2007)
  - Total: 3,122
  - Density: 352/km^{2} (912/sq mi)
- Demonym: Saintblaisois
- Time zone: UTC+01:00 (CET)
  - Summer (DST): UTC+02:00 (CEST)
- Postal code: 2072
- SFOS number: 6459
- ISO 3166 code: CH-NE
- Surrounded by: Cornaux, Cressier, Cudrefin (VD), Enges, Hauterive, Marin-Epagnier, Neuchâtel, Thielle-Wavre
- Twin towns: St. Blasien (Germany)
- Website: www.saint-blaise.ch

Saint-Blaise (French pronunciation: [sɛ̃ blɛz]) is a former municipality in the canton of Neuchâtel in Switzerland. On 1 January 2025 the former municipalities of Enges, Hauterive, Saint-Blaise and La Tène merged into the new municipality of Laténa.

== History ==
Saint-Blaise is first mentioned in 1011 as Arins. In 1209 it was mentioned as Sanctus Blasus. The municipality was formerly known by its German name St Blasien, however, that name is no longer used.

== Geography ==
Aerial view (1970)

Saint-Blaise has an area, as of 2009, of 8.9 square kilometers (3.4 mi^{2}). Of this area, 2.31 km^{2} (0.89 mi^{2}) or 26.0% is used for agricultural purposes, while 4.65 km^{2} (1.80 mi^{2}) or 52.4% is forested. Of the rest of the land, 1.85 km^{2} (0.71 mi^{2}) or 20.9% is settled (buildings or roads), 0.05 km^{2} (12 acres) or 0.6% is either rivers or lakes and 0.02 km^{2} (4.9 acres) or 0.2% is unproductive land.

Of the built up area, industrial buildings made up 1.1% of the total area while housing and buildings made up 6.0% and transportation infrastructure made up 4.5%. Power and water infrastructure as well as other special developed areas made up 2.0% of the area while parks, green belts and sports fields made up 7.2%. Out of the forested land, 50.8% of the total land area is heavily forested and 1.6% is covered with orchards or small clusters of trees. Of the agricultural land, 15.2% is used for growing crops and 6.7% is pastures, while 4.2% is used for orchards or vine crops. All the water in the municipality is in lakes.

The municipality was located in the district of Neuchâtel, until the district level was eliminated on 1 January 2018. It is at the foot of the Chaumont and along Lake Neuchatel.

== Coat of arms ==
The blazon of the municipal coat of arms is Impalled, dexter Gules Saint Blasius clad Argent adorned Or holding a Crosier Or and a Comb Sable, and sinister per fess Azure a Cross Or and Argent a Mill Wheel Sable.

== Demographics ==
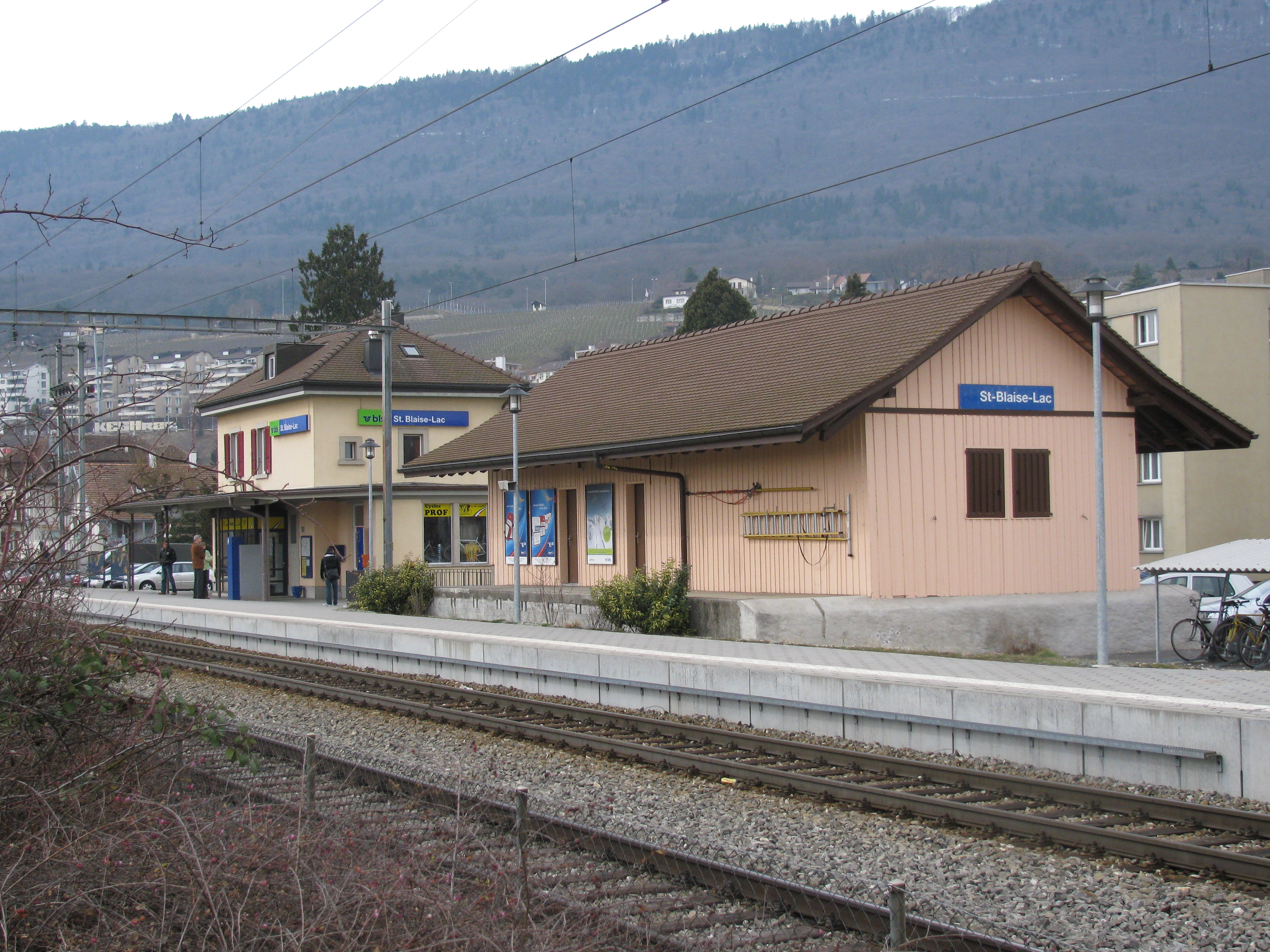
Train Station at St-Blaise

Saint-Blaise has a population (as of December 2020) of 3,258. As of 2008, 19.8% of the population are resident foreign nationals. Over the last 10 years (2000–2010) the population has changed at a rate of 0.4%. It has changed at a rate of -4.6% due to migration and at a rate of 3.1% due to births and deaths.

Most of the population (as of 2000) speaks French (2,573 or 82.5%) as their first language, German is the second most common (243 or 7.8%) and Italian is the third (109 or 3.5%). There are 3 people who speak Romansh.

As of 2008, the population was 49.1% male and 50.9% female. The population was made up of 1,211 Swiss men (38.6% of the population) and 329 (10.5%) non-Swiss men. There were 1,348 Swiss women (42.9%) and 251 (8.0%) non-Swiss women. Of the population in the municipality, 606 or about 19.4% were born in Saint-Blaise and lived there in 2000. There were 932 or 29.9% who were born in the same canton, while 769 or 24.7% were born somewhere else in Switzerland, and 722 or 23.2% were born outside of Switzerland.

As of 2000, children and teenagers (0–19 years old) make up 21.7% of the population, while adults (20–64 years old) make up 61.1% and seniors (over 64 years old) make up 17.3%.

As of 2000, there were 1,132 people who were single and never married in the municipality. There were 1,616 married individuals, 184 widows or widowers and 185 individuals who are divorced.

As of 2000, there were 1,337 private households in the municipality, and an average of 2.3 persons per household. There were 405 households that consist of only one person and 55 households with five or more people. In 2000, a total of 1,304 apartments (91.1% of the total) were permanently occupied, while 100 apartments (7.0%) were seasonally occupied and 27 apartments (1.9%) were empty. The vacancy rate for the municipality, in 2010, was 0.41%.

The historical population is given in the following chart:

== Sights ==
The entire urban village of Saint-Blaise is designated as part of the Inventory of Swiss Heritage Sites.

== Politics ==
In the 2007 federal election the most popular party was the SP which received 23.54% of the vote. The next three most popular parties were the LPS Party (19.47%), the SVP (18.63%) and the FDP (18.4%). In the federal election, a total of 1,173 votes were cast, and the voter turnout was 57.0%.

== Economy ==
As of 2010, Saint-Blaise had an unemployment rate of 4.2%. As of 2008, there were 28 people employed in the primary economic sector and about 9 businesses involved in this sector. 375 people were employed in the secondary sector and there were 38 businesses in this sector. 898 people were employed in the tertiary sector, with 143 businesses in this sector. There were 1,577 residents of the municipality who were employed in some capacity, of which females made up 44.4% of the workforce.

In 2008 the total number of full-time equivalent jobs was 1,099. The number of jobs in the primary sector was 20, of which 15 were in agriculture and 5 were in forestry or lumber production. The number of jobs in the secondary sector was 345 of which 223 or (64.6%) were in manufacturing, 4 or (1.2%) were in mining and 118 (34.2%) were in construction. The number of jobs in the tertiary sector was 734. In the tertiary sector; 323 or 44.0% were in wholesale or retail sales or the repair of motor vehicles, 14 or 1.9% were in the movement and storage of goods, 47 or 6.4% were in a hotel or restaurant, 20 or 2.7% were in the information industry, 20 or 2.7% were the insurance or financial industry, 66 or 9.0% were technical professionals or scientists, 57 or 7.8% were in education and 100 or 13.6% were in health care.

In 2000, there were 993 workers who commuted into the municipality and 1,252 workers who commuted away. The municipality is a net exporter of workers, with about 1.3 workers leaving the municipality for every one entering. About 1.4% of the workforce coming into Saint-Blaise are coming from outside Switzerland. Of the working population, 21.2% used public transportation to get to work, and 61.9% used a private car.

== Religion ==
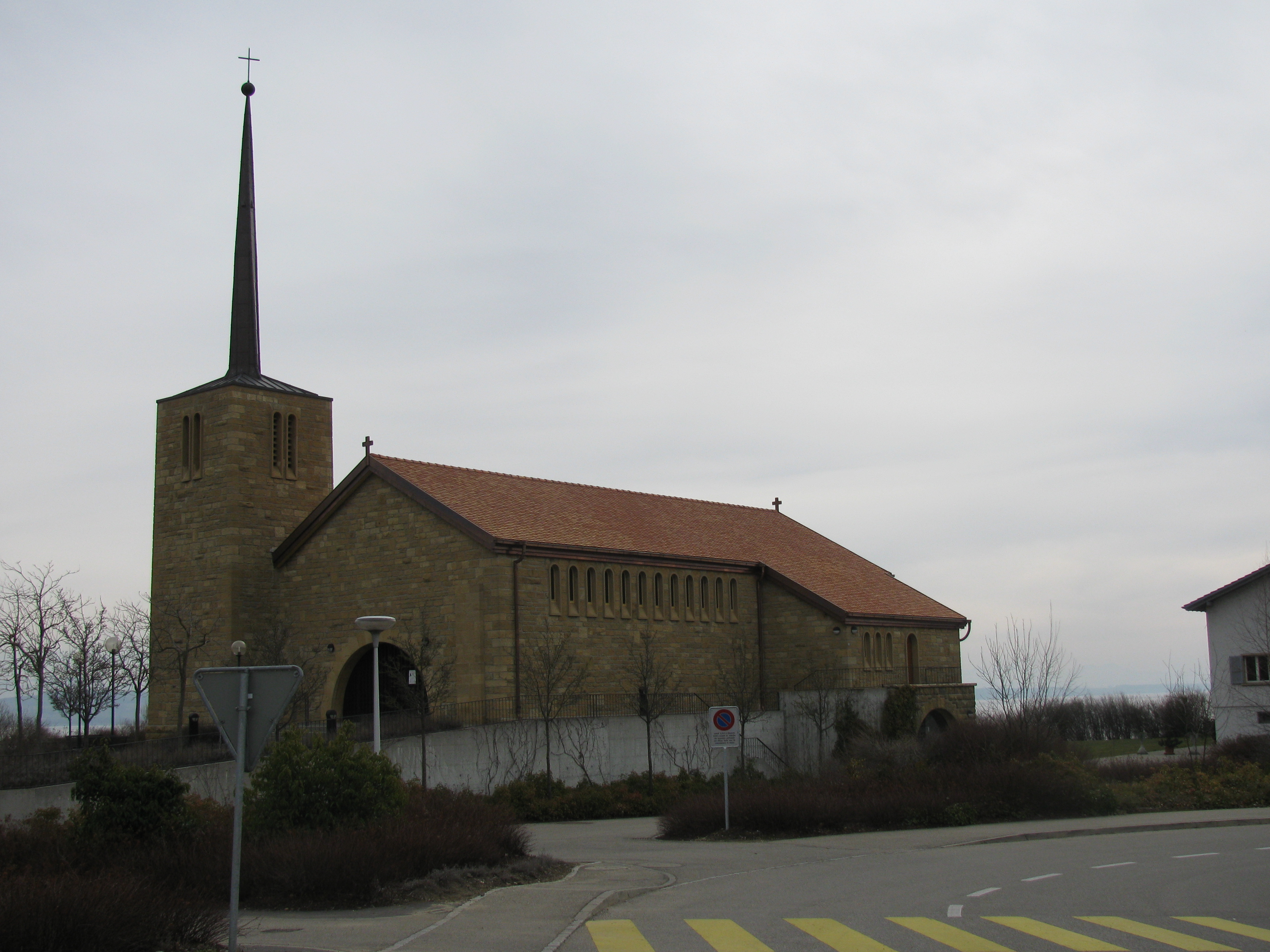
Church in St-Blaise

From the 2000 census, 972 or 31.2% were Roman Catholic, while 1,234 or 39.6% belonged to the Swiss Reformed Church. Of the rest of the population, there were 15 members of an Orthodox church (or about 0.48% of the population), there were 6 individuals (or about 0.19% of the population) who belonged to the Christian Catholic Church, and there were 124 individuals (or about 3.98% of the population) who belonged to another Christian church. There were 7 individuals (or about 0.22% of the population) who were Jewish, and 40 (or about 1.28% of the population) who were Islamic. There were 2 individuals who were Buddhist and 2 individuals who belonged to another church. 656 (or about 21.05% of the population) belonged to no church, are agnostic or atheist, and 119 individuals (or about 3.82% of the population) did not answer the question.

== Education ==
In Saint-Blaise about 1,150 or (36.9%) of the population have completed non-mandatory upper secondary education, and 629 or (20.2%) have completed additional higher education (either university or a Fachhochschule). Of the 629 who completed tertiary schooling, 51.8% were Swiss men, 27.8% were Swiss women, 13.5% were non-Swiss men and 6.8% were non-Swiss women.

In the canton of Neuchâtel most municipalities provide two years of non-mandatory kindergarten, followed by five years of mandatory primary education. The next four years of mandatory secondary education is provided at thirteen larger secondary schools, which many students travel out of their home municipality to attend. The kindergarten in Saint-Blaise is combined with Enges. During the 2010–11 school year, there were 3 kindergarten classes with a total of 64 students between the municipalities. In the same year, there were 9 primary classes with a total of 167 students.

As of 2000, there were 143 students in Saint-Blaise who came from another municipality, while 220 residents attended schools outside the municipality.

== Transportation ==
Saint-Blaise has two railway stations: St-Blaise CFF, on the Jura Foot line of Swiss Federal Railways, and St-Blaise-Lac, on the Bern–Neuchâtel line of BLS AG. Hourly or better service is available to Bern, Biel/Bienne, Fribourg, and Neuchâtel.
