= Savagnier =

- Former municipality
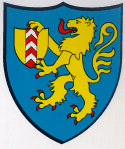
- Coat of arms
- Location of Savagnier
- Location within Switzerland Location within Canton of Neuchâtel
- Coordinates: 47°03′03″N 6°57′22″E
- Country: Switzerland
- Canton: Neuchâtel
- District: Val-de-Ruz

Area
  - Total: 8.6 km^{2} (3.3 sq mi)
- Elevation: 750 m (2,460 ft)

Population (December 2011)
  - Total: 1,196
  - Density: 140/km^{2} (360/sq mi)
- Time zone: UTC+01:00 (CET)
  - Summer (DST): UTC+02:00 (CEST)
- Postal code: 2065
- SFOS number: 6484
- ISO 3166 code: CH-NE
- Surrounded by: Chézard-Saint-Martin, Dombresson, Enges, Engollon, Fenin-Vilars-Saules, Neuchâtel, Villiers
- Website: SFSO statistics

Savagnier is a former municipality, in the district of Val-de-Ruz, in the canton of Neuchâtel, in Switzerland.

The municipalities of Boudevilliers, Cernier, Chézard-Saint-Martin, Coffrane, Dombresson, Engollon, Fenin-Vilars-Saules, Fontainemelon, Fontaines, Les Geneveys-sur-Coffrane, Les Hauts-Geneveys, Montmollin, Le Pâquier, Savagnier and Villiers merged on 1 January 2013 into the new municipality of Val-de-Ruz.

== History ==
Savagnier is first mentioned in 1143 as Savaigner.

== Geography ==
Aerial view from 1500 m by Walter Mittelholzer (1927)

Savagnier had an area, as of 2009, of 8.6 square kilometers (3.3 mi^{2}). Of this area, 4.23 km^{2} (1.63 mi^{2}) or 49.5% is used for agricultural purposes, while 3.65 km^{2} (1.41 mi^{2}) or 42.7% is forested. Of the rest of the land, 0.61 km^{2} (0.24 mi^{2}) or 7.1% is settled (buildings or roads), 0.02 km^{2} (4.9 acres) or 0.2% is either rivers or lakes and 0.06 km^{2} (15 acres) or 0.7% is unproductive land.

Of the built up area, housing and buildings made up 3.6% and transportation infrastructure made up 2.2%. Out of the forested land, all of the forested land area is covered with heavy forests. Of the agricultural land, 33.6% is used for growing crops and 15.4% is pastures. All the water in the municipality is flowing water.

The former municipality is located in the Val-de-Ruz district. It stretches from the slopes of the Chaumont mountain (1,270 m [4,170 ft]) to the banks of the Seyon river. It consists of the hamlets of Le Grand-Savagnier and Le Petit-Savagnier.

== Coat of arms ==
The blazon of the municipal coat of arms is Azure, a Lion rampant Or Langued and armed Gules holding in front paws an escutcheon of Neuchâtel (Or, on a pale Gules three chevrons Argent).

== Demographics ==
Savagnier had a population (as of 2011) of 1,196. As of 2008, 9.3% of the population are resident foreign nationals. Over the last 10 years (2000–2010) the population has changed at a rate of 35.4%. It has changed at a rate of 38% due to migration and at a rate of 8.6% due to births and deaths.

Most of the population (as of 2000) speaks French (839 or 92.9%) as their first language, German is the second most common (33 or 3.7%) and Portuguese is the third (10 or 1.1%). There are 5 people who speak Italian.

As of 2008, the population was 50.1% male and 49.9% female. The population was made up of 537 Swiss men (46.1% of the population) and 47 (4.0%) non-Swiss men. There were 537 Swiss women (46.1%) and 45 (3.9%) non-Swiss women. Of the population in the municipality, 265 or about 29.3% were born in Savagnier and lived there in 2000. There were 350 or 38.8% who were born in the same canton, while 168 or 18.6% were born somewhere else in Switzerland, and 101 or 11.2% were born outside of Switzerland.

As of 2000, children and teenagers (0–19 years old) make up 29.1% of the population, while adults (20–64 years old) make up 62% and seniors (over 64 years old) make up 8.9%.

As of 2000, there were 388 people who were single and never married in the municipality. There were 450 married individuals, 27 widows or widowers and 38 individuals who are divorced.

As of 2000, there were 338 private households in the municipality, and an average of 2.6 persons per household. There were 80 households that consist of only one person and 33 households with five or more people. In 2000, a total of 331 apartments (89.2% of the total) were permanently occupied, while 34 apartments (9.2%) were seasonally occupied and 6 apartments (1.6%) were empty. As of 2009, the construction rate of new housing units was 6.7 new units per 1000 residents.

The historical population is given in the following chart:

== Politics ==
In the 2007 federal election the most popular party was the SP which received 24.79% of the vote. The next three most popular parties were the SVP (23.34%), the LPS Party (18.9%) and the FDP (11.97%). In the federal election, a total of 413 votes were cast, and the voter turnout was 56.1%.

== Economy ==
As of 2010, Savagnier had an unemployment rate of 3.5%. As of 2008, there were 33 people employed in the primary economic sector and about 16 businesses involved in this sector. 94 people were employed in the secondary sector and there were 17 businesses in this sector. 47 people were employed in the tertiary sector, with 18 businesses in this sector. There were 473 residents of the municipality who were employed in some capacity, of which females made up 43.1% of the workforce.

In 2008 the total number of full-time equivalent jobs was 146. The number of jobs in the primary sector was 23, of which 22 were in agriculture and 1 was in forestry or lumber production. The number of jobs in the secondary sector was 89 of which 36 or (40.4%) were in manufacturing and 50 (56.2%) were in construction. The number of jobs in the tertiary sector was 34. In the tertiary sector; 7 or 20.6% were in wholesale or retail sales or the repair of motor vehicles, 4 or 11.8% were in the movement and storage of goods, 6 or 17.6% were in the information industry, 4 or 11.8% were technical professionals or scientists, 7 or 20.6% were in education and 1 was in health care.

In 2000, there were 55 workers who commuted into the municipality and 364 workers who commuted away. The municipality is a net exporter of workers, with about 6.6 workers leaving the municipality for every one entering. Of the working population, 9.5% used public transportation to get to work, and 71.9% used a private car.

== Religion ==
From the 2000 census, 175 or 19.4% were Roman Catholic, while 438 or 48.5% belonged to the Swiss Reformed Church. Of the rest of the population, there was 1 member of an Orthodox church, there were 3 individuals (or about 0.33% of the population) who belonged to the Christian Catholic Church, and there were 72 individuals (or about 7.97% of the population) who belonged to another Christian church. There was 1 individual who was Islamic. There was 1 person who was Buddhist and 1 individual who belonged to another church. 213 (or about 23.59% of the population) belonged to no church, are agnostic or atheist, and 33 individuals (or about 3.65% of the population) did not answer the question.

== Education ==
In Savagnier about 377 or (41.7%) of the population have completed non-mandatory upper secondary education, and 113 or (12.5%) have completed additional higher education (either university or a Fachhochschule). Of the 113 who completed tertiary schooling, 57.5% were Swiss men, 30.1% were Swiss women, 8.0% were non-Swiss men and 4.4% were non-Swiss women.

In the canton of Neuchâtel most municipalities provide two years of non-mandatory kindergarten, followed by five years of mandatory primary education. The next four years of mandatory secondary education is provided at thirteen larger secondary schools, which many students travel out of their home municipality to attend. During the 2010–11 school year, there were 1.5 kindergarten classes with a total of 30 students in Savagnier. In the same year, there were 6 primary classes with a total of 120 students.

As of 2000, there were 4 students in Savagnier who came from another municipality, while 82 residents attended schools outside the municipality.
