= Hauterive, Neuchâtel =

Hauterive
- Former municipality
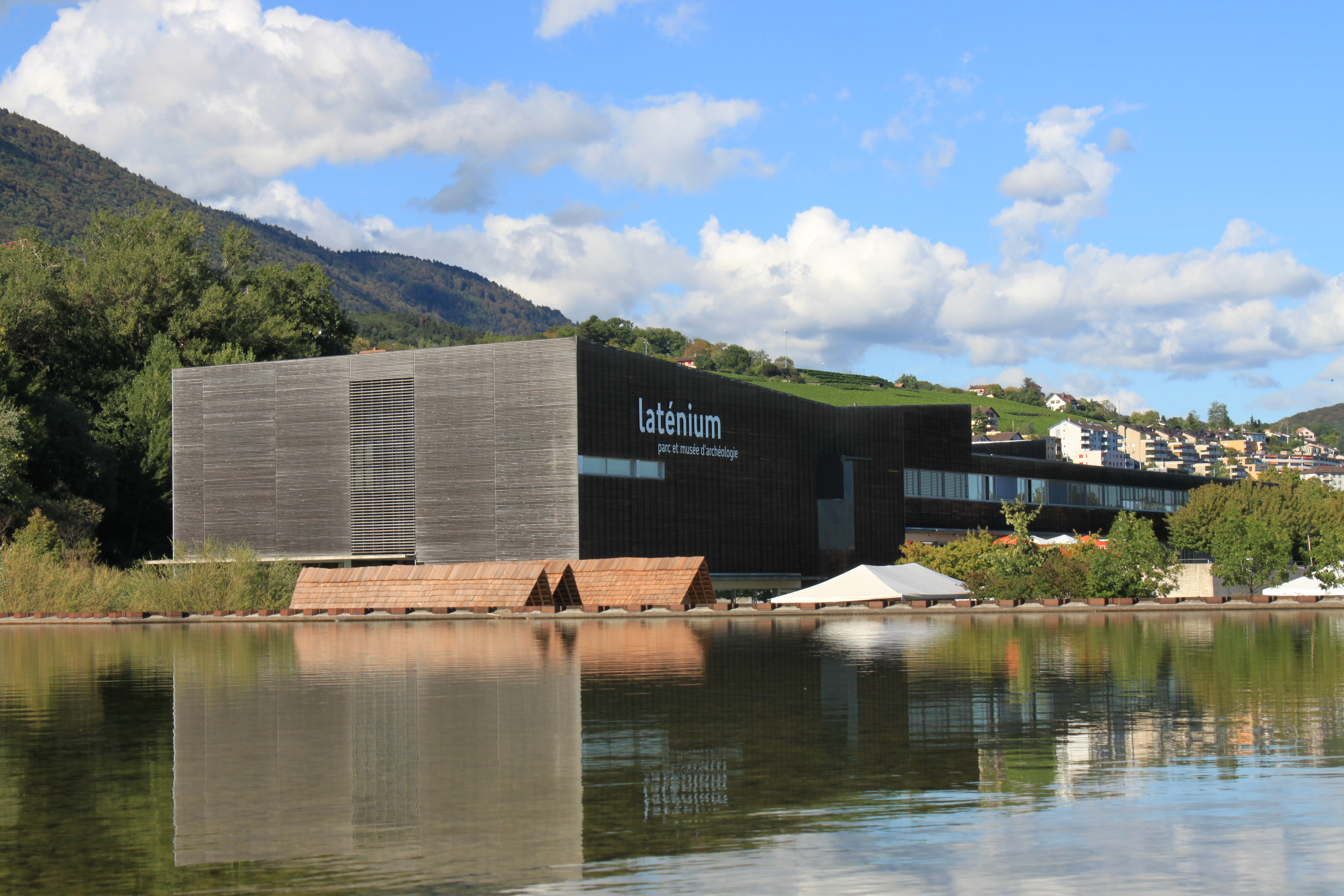
- Laténium Museum in Hauterive

- Coat of arms
- Location of Hauterive
- Location within Switzerland Location within Canton of Neuchâtel
- Coordinates: 47°1′N 6°58′E
- Country: Switzerland
- Canton: Neuchâtel

Area
  - Total: 2.07 km^{2} (0.80 sq mi)
- Elevation: 501 m (1,644 ft)

Population (December 2007)
  - Total: 2,484
  - Density: 1,200/km^{2} (3,110/sq mi)
- Time zone: UTC+01:00 (CET)
  - Summer (DST): UTC+02:00 (CEST)
- Postal code: 2068
- SFOS number: 6454
- ISO 3166 code: CH-NE
- Surrounded by: Cudrefin (VD), Neuchâtel, Saint-Blaise
- Website: http://www.hauterive.ch

Hauterive (French pronunciation: [otʁiv]) is a former municipality in the canton of Neuchâtel in Switzerland. On 1 January 2025 the former municipalities of Enges, Hauterive, Saint-Blaise and La Tène merged into the new municipality of Laténa.

== History ==
Hauterive is first mentioned about 1148 as arta ripa. The village's beginnings were first recorded in 1443 when monks founded the monastery Fontaine-André.

== Geography ==
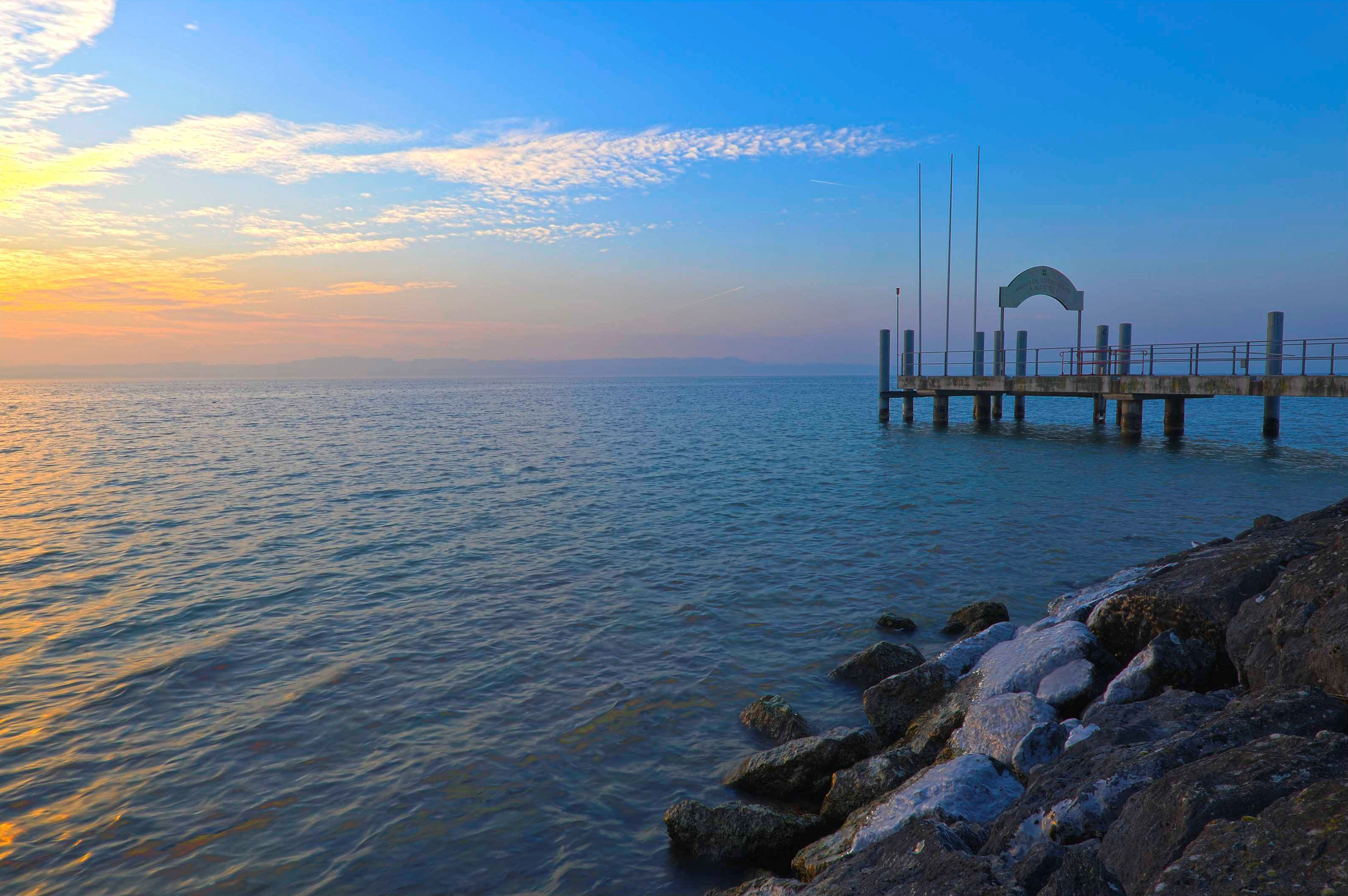
Lake Neuchâtel at Hauterive

Aerial view from 1000 m by Walter Mittelholzer (1926)

Hauterive has an area, as of 2009, of 2.1 square kilometers (0.81 mi^{2}). Of this area, 0.25 km^{2} (0.097 mi^{2}) or 11.8% is used for agricultural purposes, while 1.27 km^{2} (0.49 mi^{2}) or 59.9% is forested. Of the rest of the land, 0.64 km^{2} (0.25 mi^{2}) or 30.2% is settled (buildings or roads).

Of the built-up area, industrial buildings made up 1.9% of the total area while housing and buildings made up 15.6% and transportation infrastructure made up 6.6%. while parks, green belts and sports fields made up 5.7%. Out of the forested land, all of the forested land area is covered with heavy forests. Of the agricultural land, 0.9% is used for growing crops and 2.8% is pastures, while 8.0% is used for orchards or vine crops.

The municipality was located in the Neuchâtel District until the district level was eliminated on 1 January 2018. It is at the foot of the Chaumont near Neuchâtel.

The Hauterivian Age of the Cretaceous period of geological time is named for Hauterive.

== Coat of arms ==
The blazon of the municipal coat of arms is Azure, a Cross Or.

== Demographics ==
Hauterive has a population (as of December 2020) of 2,636. As of 2008, 24.5% of the population are resident foreign nationals. Over the last 10 years (2000–2010) the population has changed at a rate of -5%. It has changed at a rate of -7.9% due to migration and at a rate of 2.9% due to births and deaths.

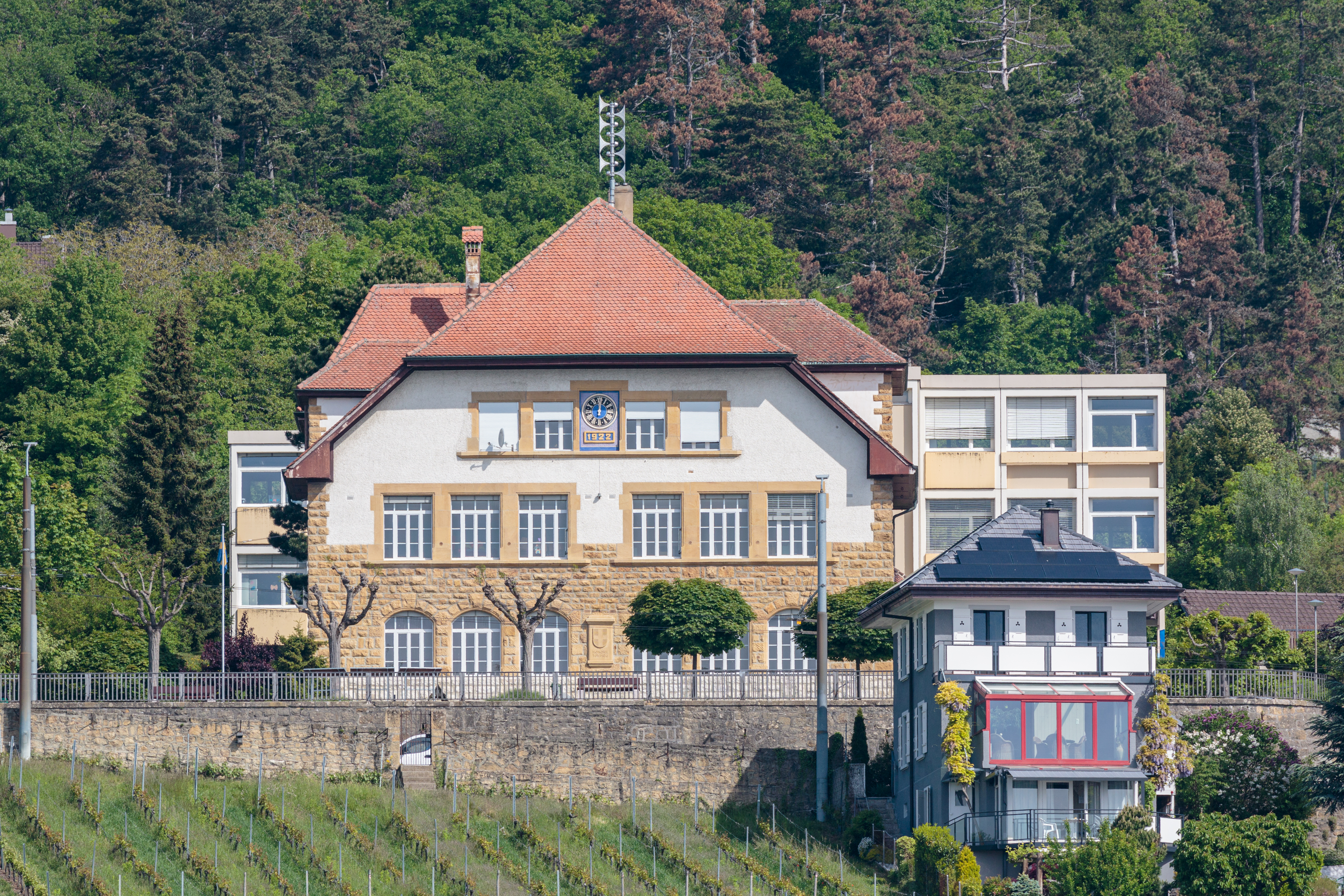
(Primary) School, built 1922

Most of the population (as of 2000) speaks French (2,175 or 82.5%) as their first language, German is the second most common (164 or 6.2%) and Italian is the third (92 or 3.5%). There is 1 person who speaks Romansh.

As of 2008, the population was 47.9% male and 52.1% female. The population was made up of 890 Swiss men (34.8% of the population) and 335 (13.1%) non-Swiss men. There were 1,028 Swiss women (40.2%) and 304 (11.9%) non-Swiss women. Of the population in the municipality, 358 or about 13.6% were born in Hauterive and lived there in 2000. There were 857 or 32.5% who were born in the same canton, while 671 or 25.4% were born somewhere else in Switzerland, and 689 or 26.1% were born outside of Switzerland.

As of 2000, children and teenagers (0–19 years old) make up 20% of the population, while adults (20–64 years old) make up 65.4% and seniors (over 64 years old) make up 14.6%.

As of 2000, there were 1,000 people who were single and never married in the municipality. There were 1,287 married individuals, 153 widows or widowers and 197 individuals who are divorced.

As of 2000, there were 1,227 private households in the municipality, and an average of 2.1 persons per household. There were 475 households that consist of only one person and 32 households with five or more people. In 2000, a total of 1,209 apartments (93.9% of the total) were permanently occupied, while 59 apartments (4.6%) were seasonally occupied and 19 apartments (1.5%) were empty. As of 2009, the construction rate of new housing units was 0.4 new units per 1000 residents. The vacancy rate for the municipality, in 2010, was 0.23%.

The historical population is given in the following chart:

== Heritage sites of national significance ==
The Laténium, the cantonal museum of archeology, is listed as a Swiss heritage site of national significance.

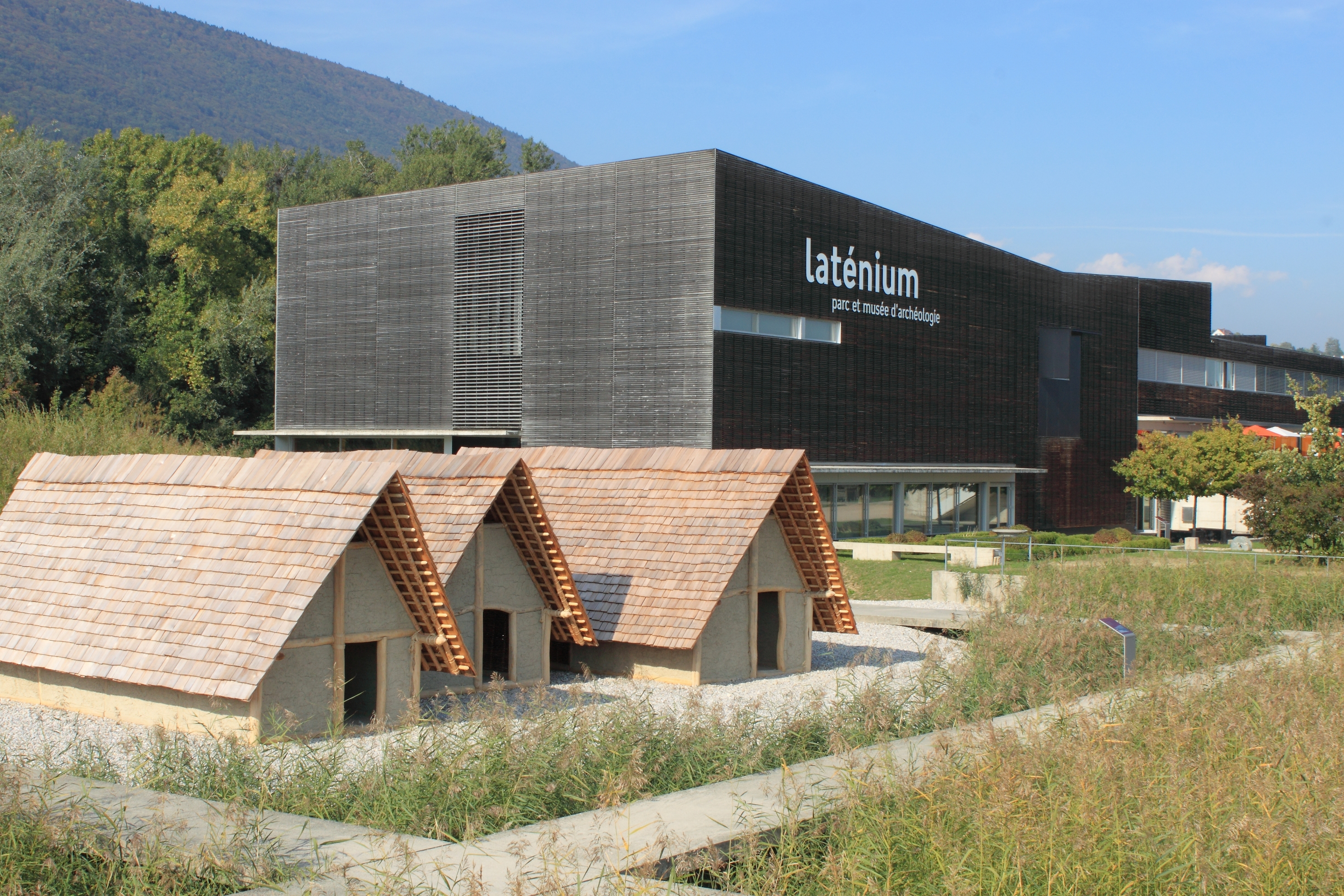
View of the Laténium museum

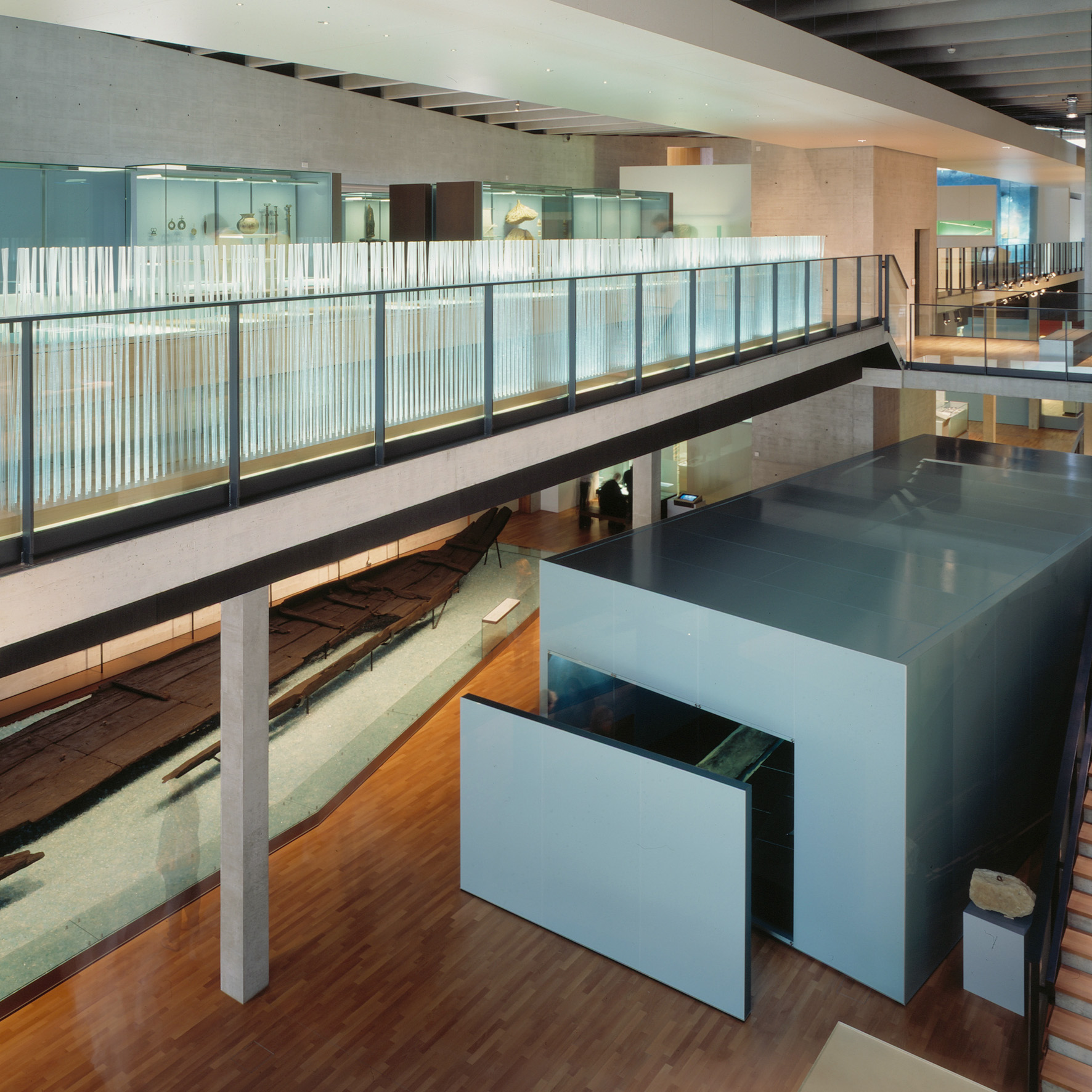
Exhibit in the museum

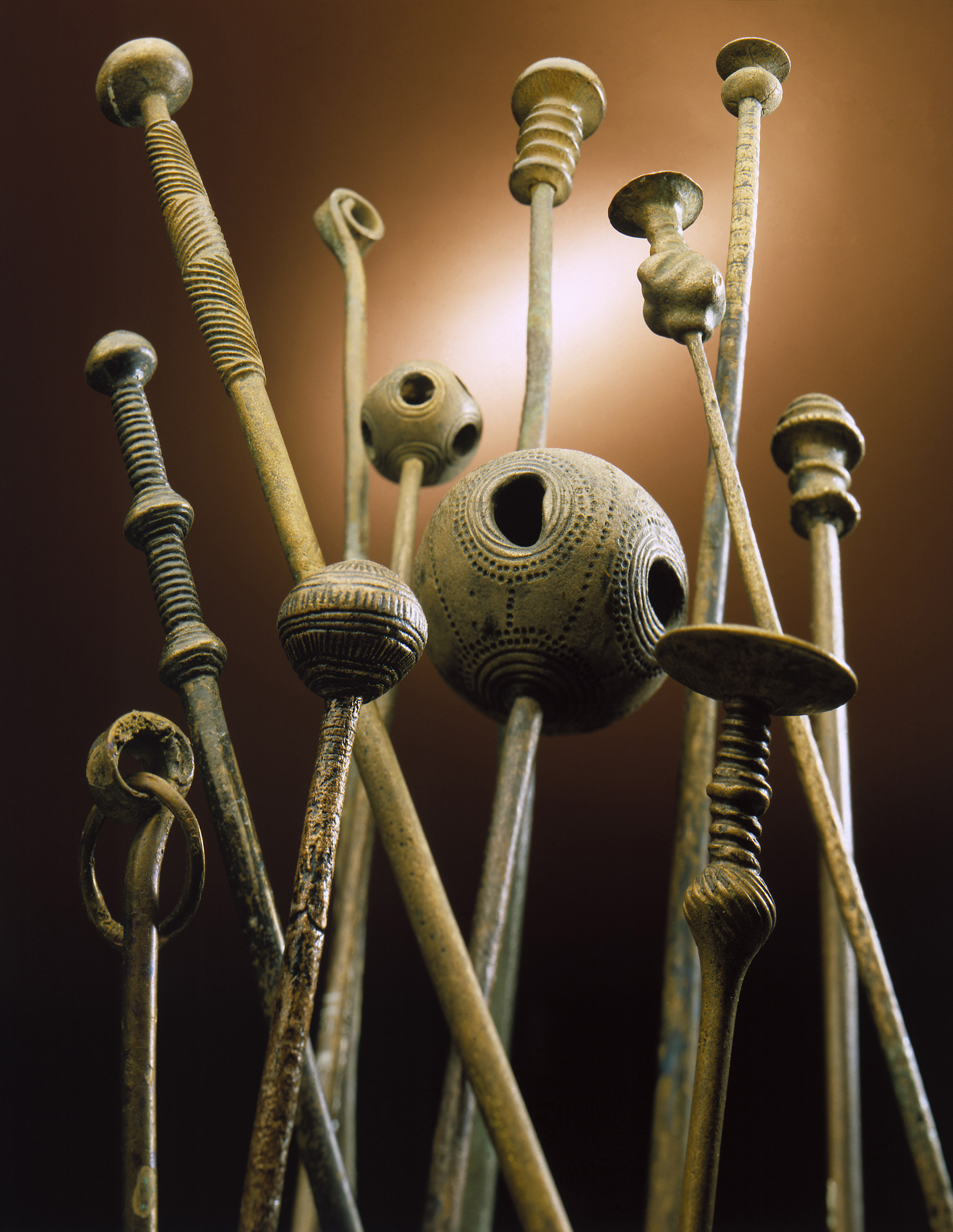
Bronze Age pins

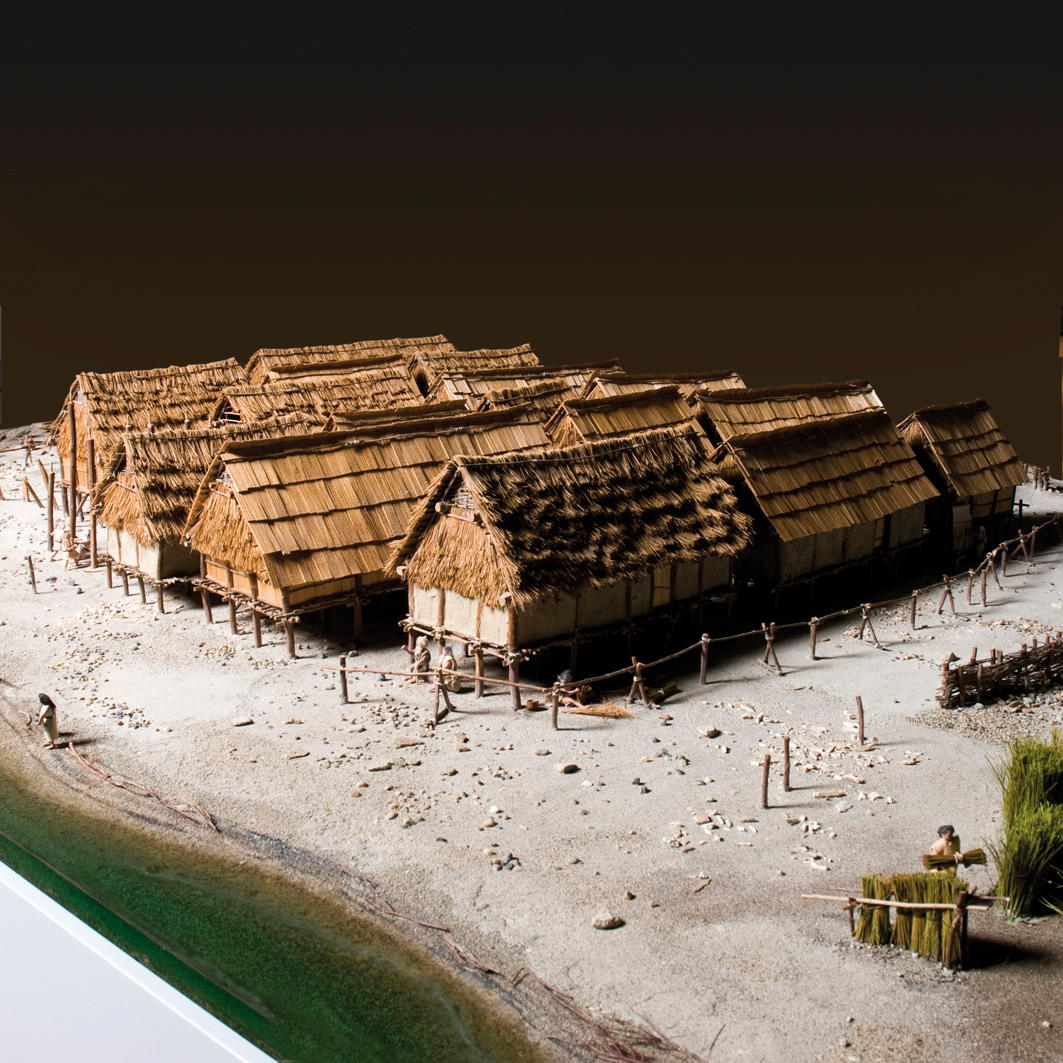
Scale model of the lacustrine village of Cortaillod-Est

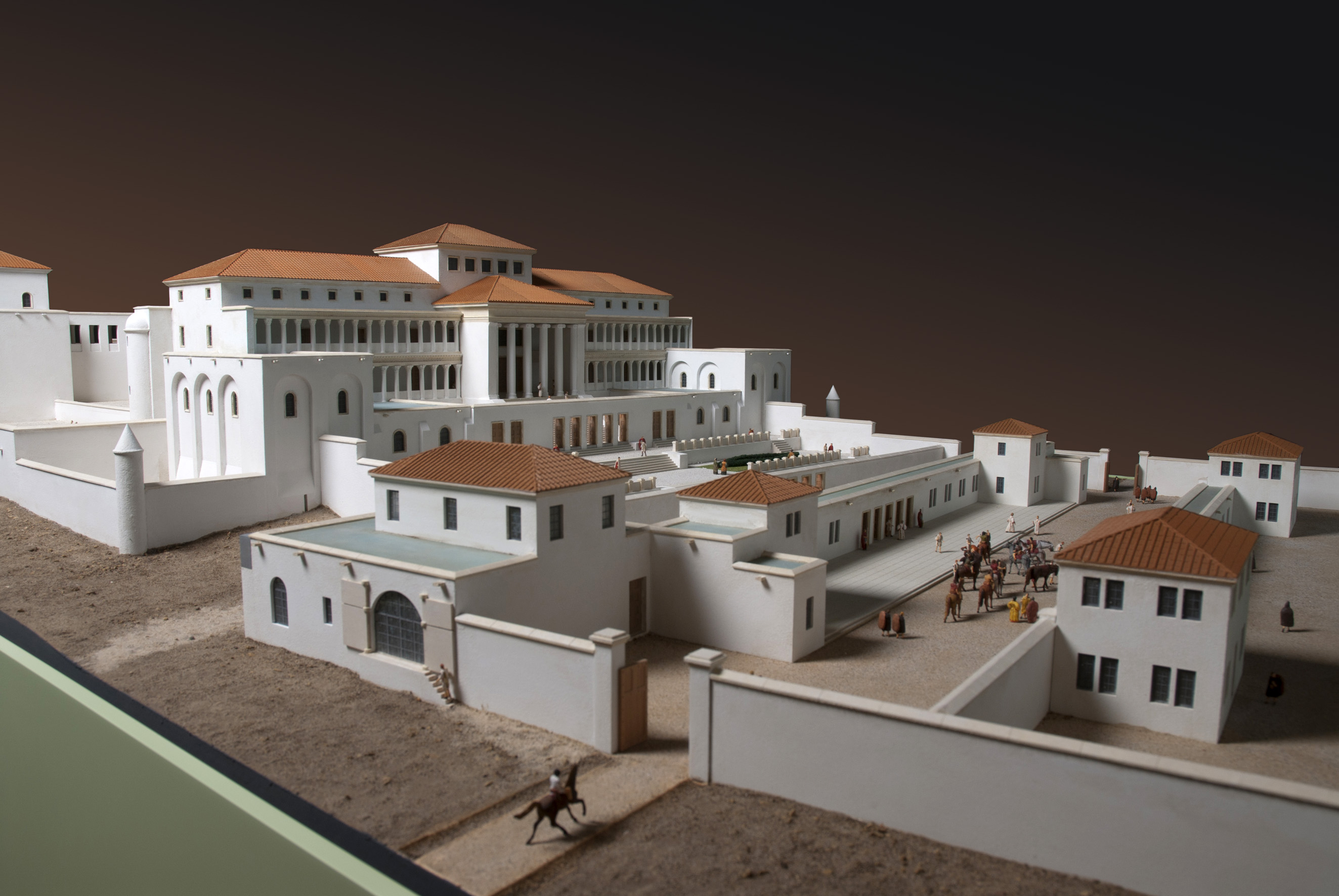
Model of the Colombier Roman villa

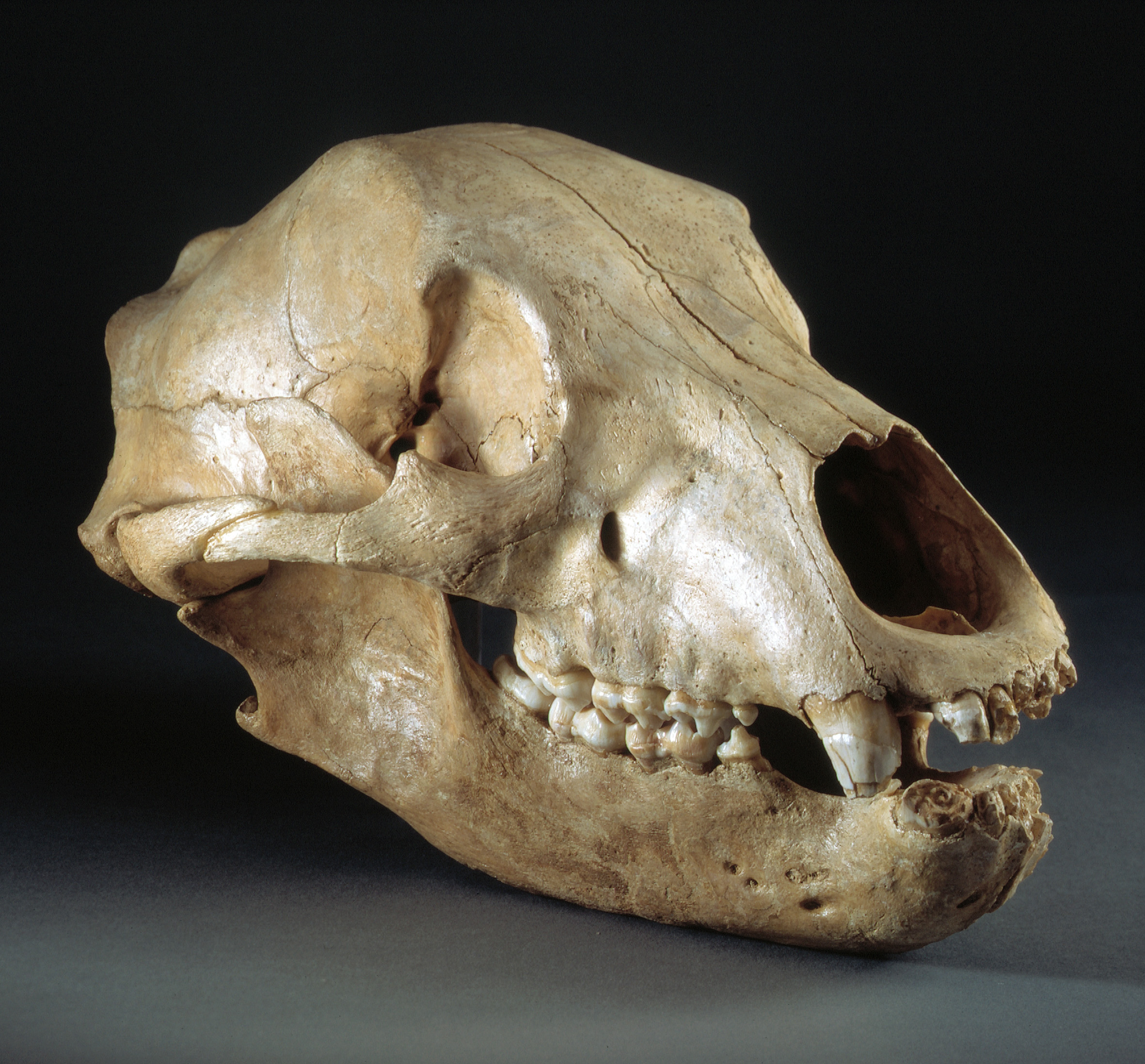
Female bear skull found in the Bichon cave (la Chaux de Fonds-Neuchâtel). 11000 B.C.

== Politics ==
In the 2007 Swiss federal election the most popular party was the SP which received 23.81% of the vote. The next three most popular parties were the FDP (19.62%), the SVP (18.84%) and the LPS Party (15.16%). In the federal election, a total of 855 votes were cast, and the voter turnout was 53.2%.

== Economy ==
As of 2010, Hauterive had an unemployment rate of 5.6%. As of 2008, there were 10 people employed in the primary economic sector and about 5 businesses involved in this sector. 195 people were employed in the secondary sector and there were 14 businesses in this sector. 360 people were employed in the tertiary sector, with 61 businesses in this sector. There were 1,410 residents of the municipality who were employed in some capacity, of which females made up 43.5% of the workforce.

In 2008 the total number of full-time equivalent jobs was 493. The number of jobs in the primary sector was 9, of which 6 were in agriculture and 2 were in fishing or fisheries. The number of jobs in the secondary sector was 188 of which 150 or (79.8%) were in manufacturing and 37 (19.7%) were in construction. The number of jobs in the tertiary sector was 296. In the tertiary sector; 126 or 42.6% were in wholesale or retail sales or the repair of motor vehicles, 3 or 1.0% were in the movement and storage of goods, 21 or 7.1% were in a hotel or restaurant, 7 or 2.4% were in the information industry, 14 or 4.7% were the insurance or financial industry, 9 or 3.0% were technical professionals or scientists, 15 or 5.1% were in education and 53 or 17.9% were in health care.

In 2000, there were 411 workers who commuted into the municipality and 1,230 workers who commuted away. The municipality is a net exporter of workers, with about 3.0 workers leaving the municipality for every one entering. About 2.9% of the workforce coming into Hauterive are coming from outside Switzerland. Of the working population, 24.3% used public transportation to get to work, and 61.7% used a private car.

== Religion ==
From the 2000 census, 851 or 32.3% were Roman Catholic, while 922 or 35.0% belonged to the Swiss Reformed Church. Of the rest of the population, there were 29 members of an Orthodox church (or about 1.10% of the population), there were 4 individuals (or about 0.15% of the population) who belonged to the Christian Catholic Church, and there were 110 individuals (or about 4.17% of the population) who belonged to another Christian church. There were 2 individuals (or about 0.08% of the population) who were Jewish, and 93 (or about 3.53% of the population) who were Islamic. There were 13 individuals who were Buddhist, 5 individuals who were Hindu and 3 individuals who belonged to another church. 564 (or about 21.39% of the population) belonged to no church, are agnostic or atheist, and 93 individuals (or about 3.53% of the population) did not answer the question.

== Education ==
In Hauterive about 1,063 or (40.3%) of the population have completed non-mandatory upper secondary education, and 473 or (17.9%) have completed additional higher education (either university or a Fachhochschule). Of the 473 who completed tertiary schooling, 51.6% were Swiss men, 22.8% were Swiss women, 15.2% were non-Swiss men and 10.4% were non-Swiss women.

In the canton of Neuchâtel most municipalities provide two years of non-mandatory kindergarten, followed by five years of mandatory primary education. The next four years of mandatory secondary education is provided at thirteen larger secondary schools, which many students travel out of their home municipality to attend. During the 2010-11 school year, there were 2 kindergarten classes with a total of 42 students in Hauterive. In the same year, there were 5 primary classes with a total of 101 students.

As of 2000, there were 11 students in Hauterive who came from another municipality, while 207 residents attended schools outside the municipality.
