= Le Landeron =

- Municipality
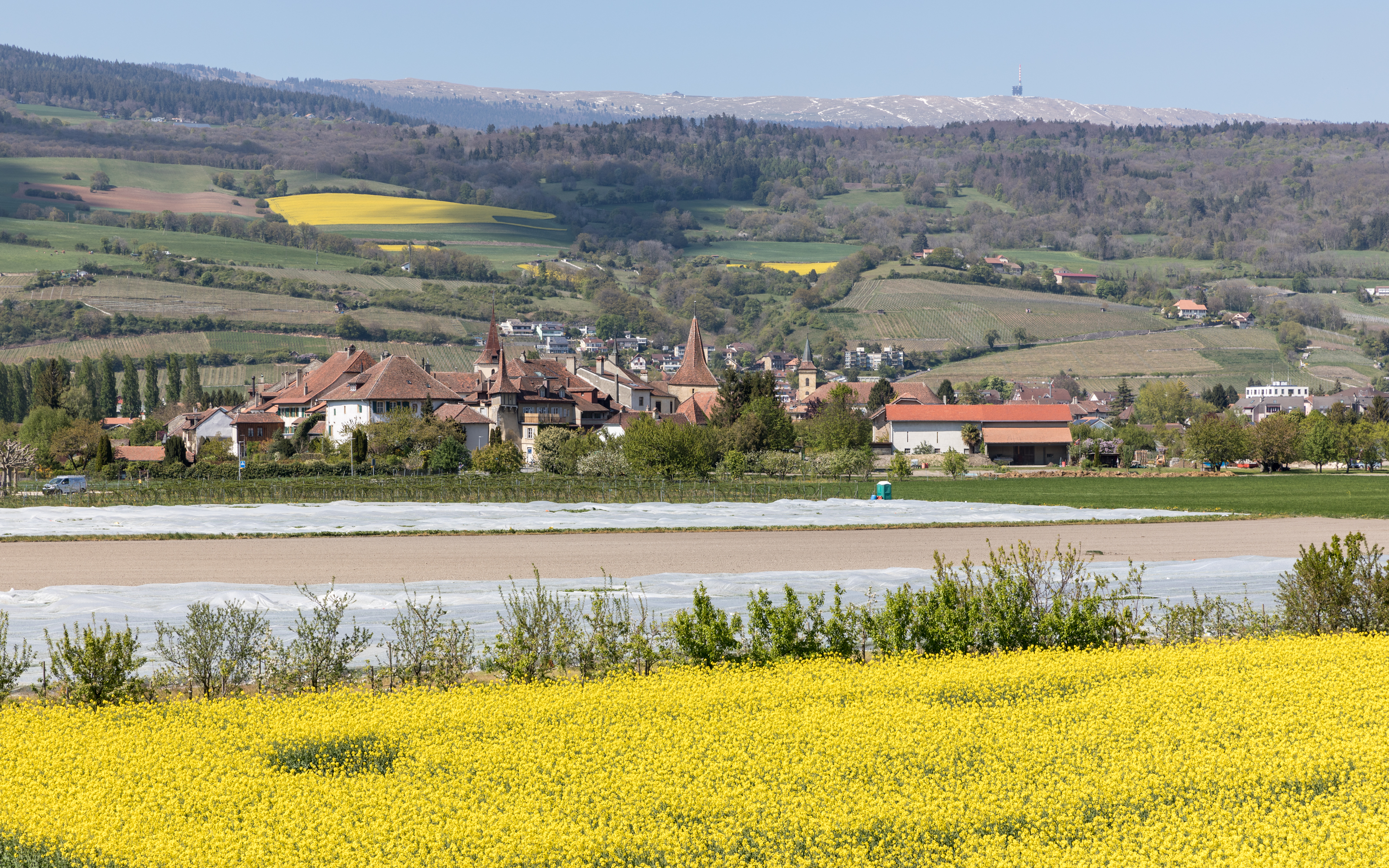

- Coat of arms
- Location of Le Landeron
- Location within Switzerland Location within Canton of Neuchâtel
- Coordinates: 47°3′N 7°4′E
- Country: Switzerland
- Canton: Neuchâtel

Area
  - Total: 10.31 km^{2} (3.98 sq mi)
- Elevation: 434 m (1,424 ft)

Population (December 2007)
  - Total: 4,315
  - Density: 418.5/km^{2} (1,084/sq mi)
- Time zone: UTC+01:00 (CET)
  - Summer (DST): UTC+02:00 (CEST)
- Postal code: 2525
- SFOS number: 6455
- ISO 3166 code: CH-NE
- Localities: Combes
- Surrounded by: Cressier, Gals (BE), La Neuveville (BE), Laténa, Lignières
- Twin towns: Solothurn (Switzerland)
- Website: www.landeron.ch

Le Landeron is a municipality in the Swiss canton of Neuchâtel.

== History ==
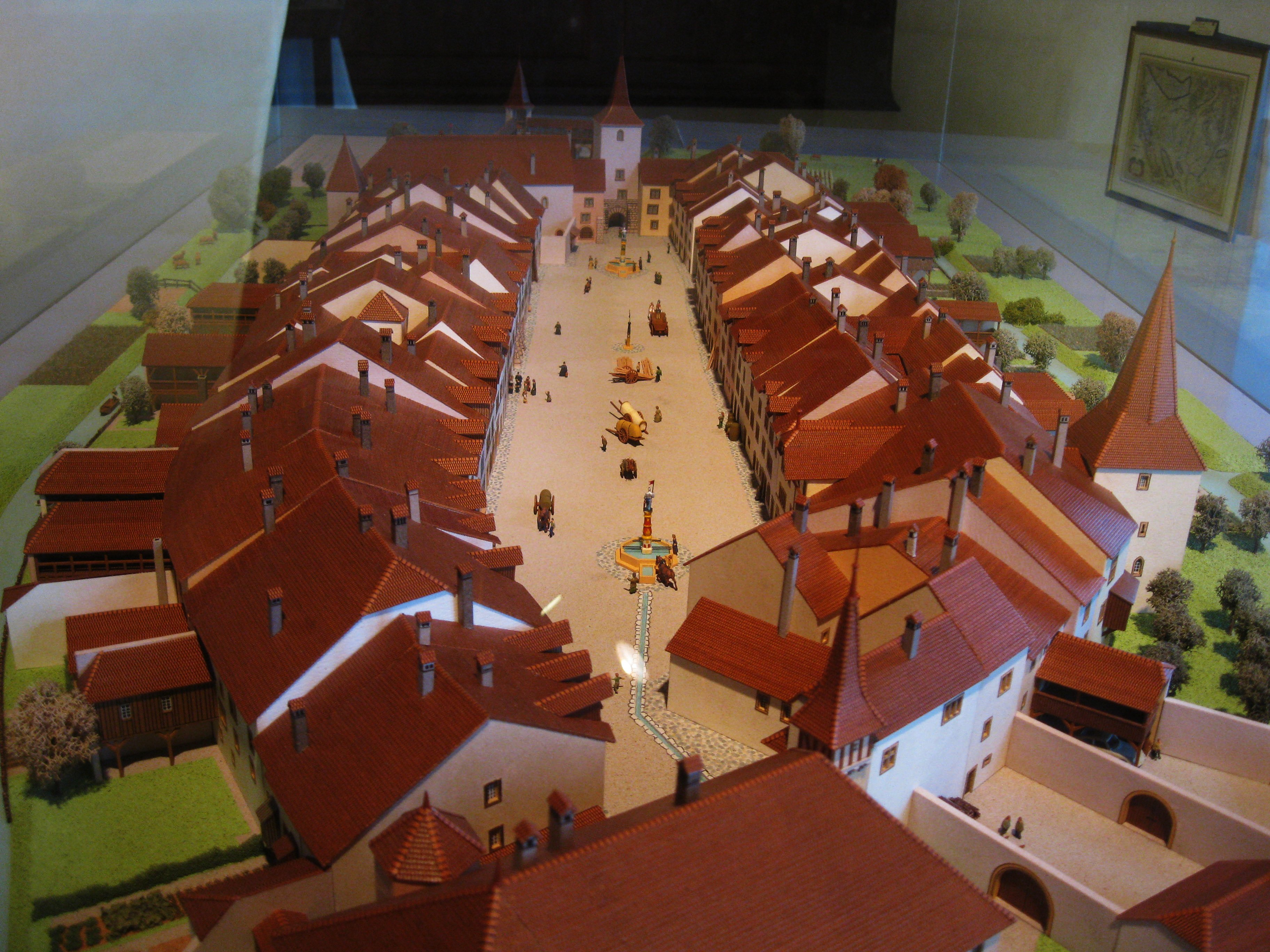
Model of the old town of Le Landeron

Le Landeron is first mentioned about 1209 as Landiron.

=== Prehistory ===
The first traces of human habitation near Le Landeron were the remains of a pottery workshop (961-957 BC) discovered on the banks of the Thielle. At Les Carougets there is a grave from the late Bronze Age, a Roman villa and traces of the foundations of huts from the Early Middle Ages. Furthermore, several Roman statuettes have been discovered, including Hercules, a rooster and what may be a peacock.

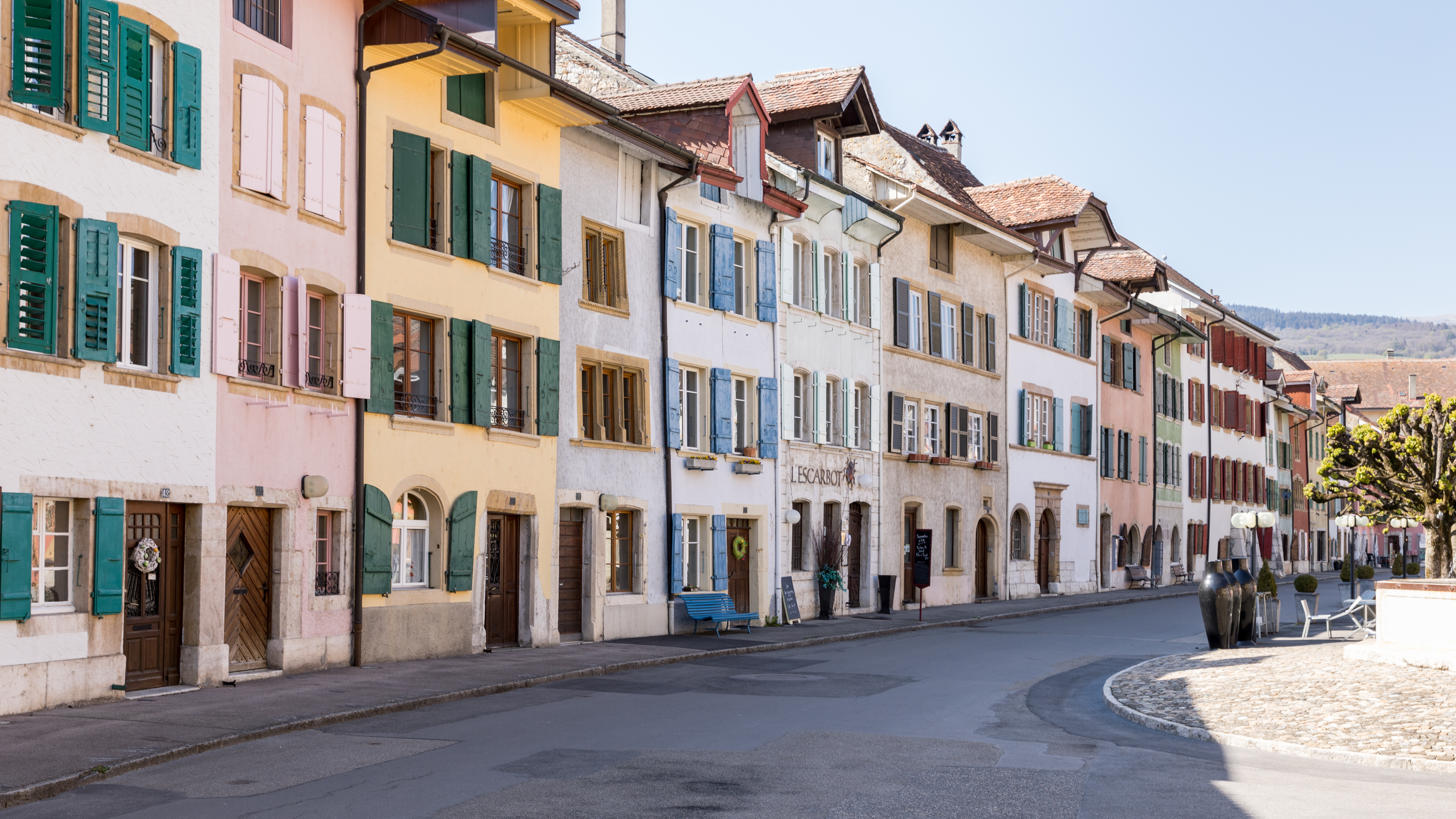
Le Landeron, Ville West

=== Middle Ages ===
The name Le Landeron appears for the first time around 1209, as a place name mentioned in the fishing rights of the neighboring Benedictine monastery of St. Johannsen in Erlach. Since it was given as a place name, it appears that the area where the town now stands was not inhabited. The nearby houses were up in the Jura hills and were grouped under the name Nugerol. The area around what is now La Tour was once the site of a fortification, which was destroyed around 1309. The Duke of Austria forbade anyone to rebuild the fortifications.

On 1 September 1325, Rudolph IV of Neuchâtel bought the Le Landeron meadow in the Thielle valley. In 1328-29 he built a fortified town there. The town was founded to protect the eastern part of the county of Neuchâtel and to control the streets and waterways of the Jura foothills. Le Landeron took the old rights of Nugerol which were comparable to those of citizens of Neuchatel. In 1350 Count Louis of Neuchâtel officially recognized that these rights applied to the town. In 1373, the new mistress of the town, Varenne of Neuchâtel, granted it some additional rights and it became the capital of the Barony of Le Landeron. However, in 1424, the Barony came back under the direct rule of the Counts of Neuchatel. They retained the right to rule themselves as a mostly independent town. They had their own town banner and a town council in which the citizens of Cressier appointed a third of the members.

=== Early modern age ===
In 1449 Le Landeron entered into a treaty with Solothurn that was to shape the religious affairs of the town. During the Protestant Reformation, the town's rulers were supported by Solothurn when they chose to remain by the old faith. Of all the neighboring municipalities, only Lignières converted to the Reformed faith in 1556. Since then, Le Landeron has stubbornly defended its religious particularity. The town remained loyal to Marie, the Duchess of Nemours during her conflicts with her step-daughter over the inheritance. After the extinction of her line in 1707, Le Landeron submitted to Frederick I, King of Prussia after he threatened military force.

=== Modern Le Landeron ===
After the founding of the Republic of Neuchâtel in 1848, the towns of Le Landeron and Cressier began to separate. Then, in 1868, they separated completely and each town granted citizenship in town to all residents. During the 19th century the traditional farming and wine growing town began to change. The Jura water correction drained the surrounding swamps and opened up much of the valley to agriculture. In 1869-70 a train station was built and industry moved into the town. The first industries to settle in Le Landeron were parts suppliers for the watch industry. While the old town has preserved its compact and fortified appearance, many new homes were built on the Jura slopes.

Because of the number of immigrants from Reformed areas into the town, they founded a Reformed parish in 1894. During the 20th century agriculture declined in importance (in 1910 there were 320 agriculture jobs while in 2000 it was only 45). Every year since 1973 one of the largest antiques markets in Switzerland (Fête de la brocante) is held in Le Landeron. In 1974, the town was connected to the A5 motorway. In 1991 one of the five secondary school regional centers of the Canton of Neuchâtel (Les Deux-Thielle) was opened in town. At the beginning of the 21st century, it is a residential community with numerous, especially in the microtechnology industry, specialized small businesses and possessed the second largest wine-growing region in the canton.

== Geography ==
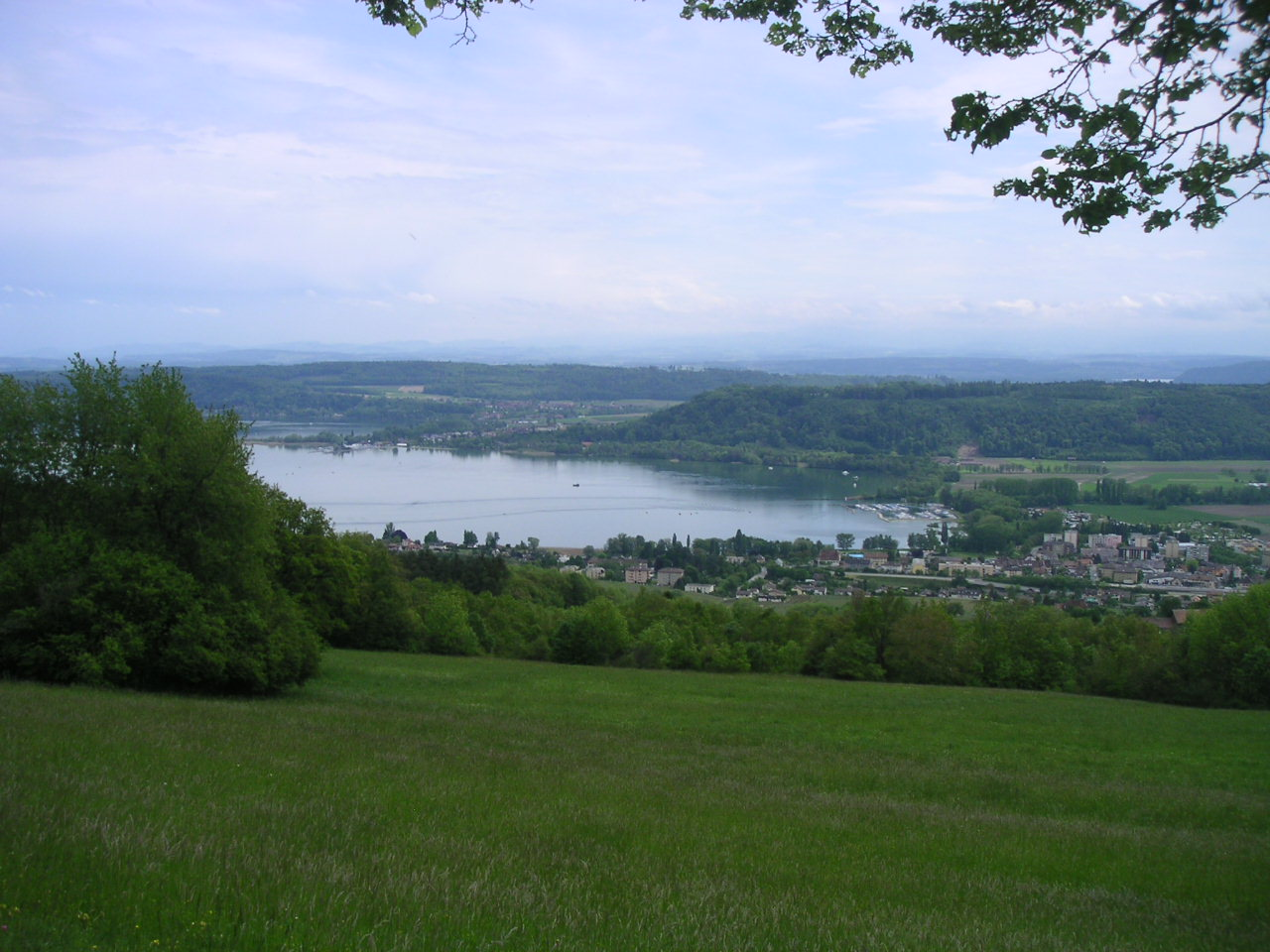
Le Landeron and Lake Biel

Aerial view (1962)

Le Landeron has an area, as of 2009, of 10.3 square kilometers (4.0 mi^{2}). Of this area, 4.07 km^{2} (1.57 mi^{2}) or 39.5% is used for agricultural purposes, while 4.46 km^{2} (1.72 mi^{2}) or 43.3% is forested. Of the rest of the land, 1.56 km^{2} (0.60 mi^{2}) or 15.1% is settled (buildings or roads), 0.12 km^{2} (30 acres) or 1.2% is either rivers or lakes and 0.05 km^{2} (12 acres) or 0.5% is unproductive land.

Of the built up area, housing and buildings made up 7.3% and transportation infrastructure made up 4.7%. while parks, green belts and sports fields made up 2.0%. Out of the forested land, 41.4% of the total land area is heavily forested and 1.8% is covered with orchards or small clusters of trees. Of the agricultural land, 18.5% is used for growing crops and 13.0% is pastures, while 8.0% is used for orchards or vine crops. All the water in the municipality is flowing water.

The municipality was located in the district of Neuchâtel, until the district level was eliminated on 1 January 2018.

It is on a rocky moraine island in the middle of the swampy Thielle valley near Lake Biel. The largely French-speaking town lies at Switzerland's language border with the German-speaking canton of Bern.

In 1875, Le Landeron and Combes were merged and the municipality was officially known as Landeron-Combes until 1966.

== Coat of arms ==
The blazon of the municipal coat of arms is Per fess, Or on a pale Gules three Chevrons Argent, and Azure two Pike nainaint proper.

== Demographics ==
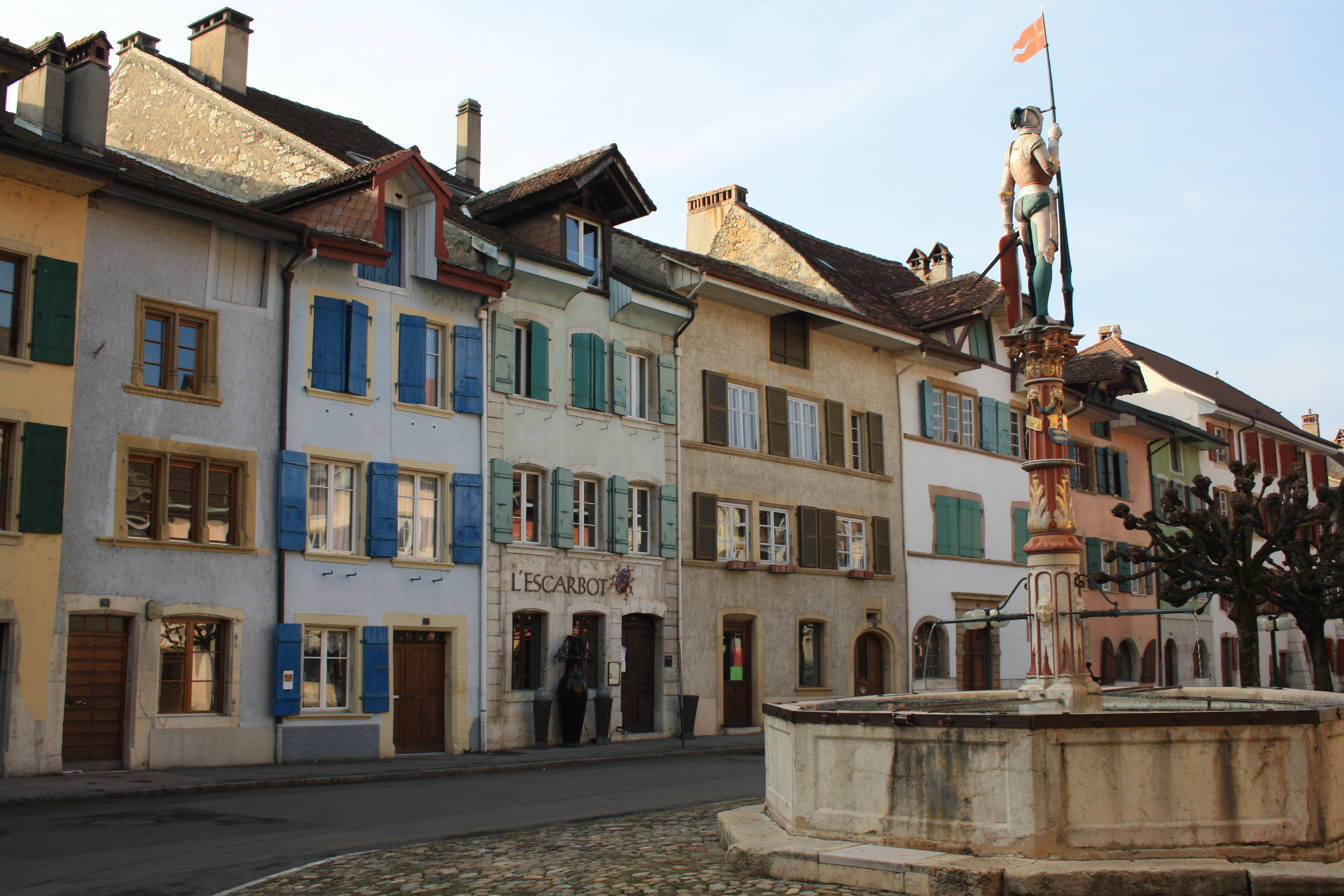
Old town of Le Landeron

Le Landeron has a population (as of December 2020) of 4,642. As of 2008, 17.7% of the population are resident foreign nationals. Over the last 10 years (2000–2010) the population has changed at a rate of 3.8%. It has changed at a rate of 1.3% due to migration and at a rate of 3.4% due to births and deaths.

Most of the population (as of 2000) speaks French (3,587 or 84.9%) as their first language, German is the second most common (328 or 7.8%) and Italian is the third (91 or 2.2%). There is 1 person who speaks Romansh.

As of 2008, the population was 48.8% male and 51.2% female. The population was made up of 1,734 Swiss men (39.0% of the population) and 436 (9.8%) non-Swiss men. There were 1,920 Swiss women (43.2%) and 354 (8.0%) non-Swiss women. Of the population in the municipality, 1,135 or about 26.9% were born in Le Landeron and lived there in 2000. There were 831 or 19.7% who were born in the same canton, while 1,355 or 32.1% were born somewhere else in Switzerland, and 779 or 18.4% were born outside of Switzerland.

As of 2000, children and teenagers (0–19 years old) make up 24.8% of the population, while adults (20–64 years old) make up 61.7% and seniors (over 64 years old) make up 13.5%.

As of 2000, there were 1,653 people who were single and never married in the municipality. There were 2,058 married individuals, 236 widows or widowers and 280 individuals who are divorced.

As of 2000, there were 1,800 private households in the municipality, and an average of 2.3 persons per household. There were 602 households that consist of only one person and 85 households with five or more people. In 2000, a total of 1,744 apartments (90.7% of the total) were permanently occupied, while 149 apartments (7.7%) were seasonally occupied and 30 apartments (1.6%) were empty. As of 2009, the construction rate of new housing units was 5.2 new units per 1000 residents. The vacancy rate for the municipality, in 2010, was 0.44%.

The historical population is given in the following chart:

== Heritage sites of national significance ==
The Chapelle Ste-Anne, the Croix du Bourg, the Neolithic and Roman era sites at the Ensemble de la Vieille Thielle, the Fountain de St-Maurice, the Fountain du Vaillant and the Town Hall with the Dix-Mille-Martyrs Chapel and Museum are listed as Swiss heritage site of national significance. The entire town of Le Landeron is part of the Inventory of Swiss Heritage Sites.

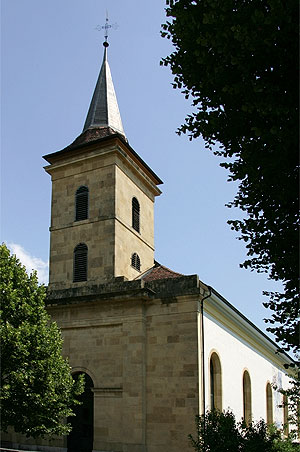
Chapelle Ste-Anne

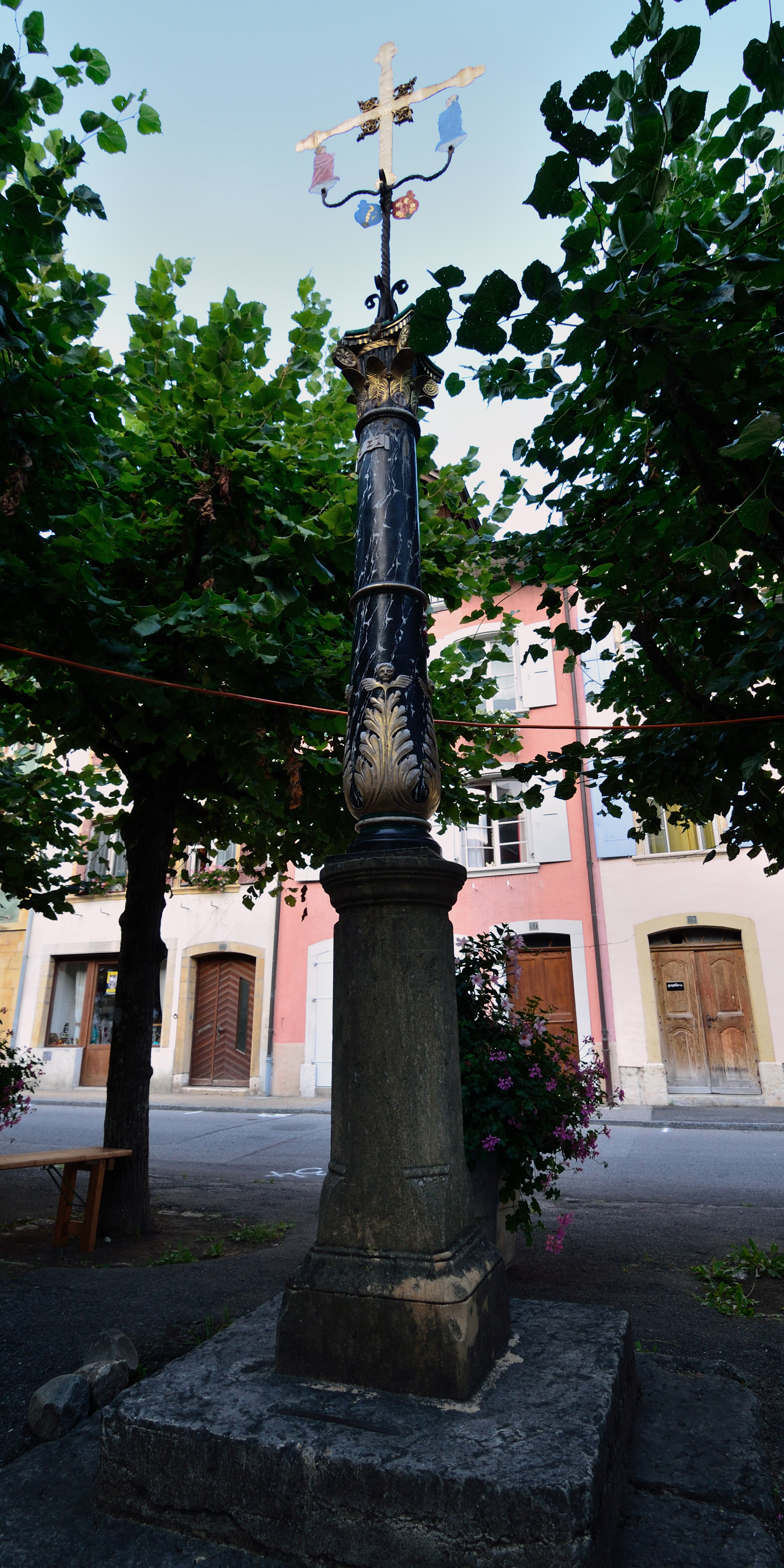
Croix Du Bourg

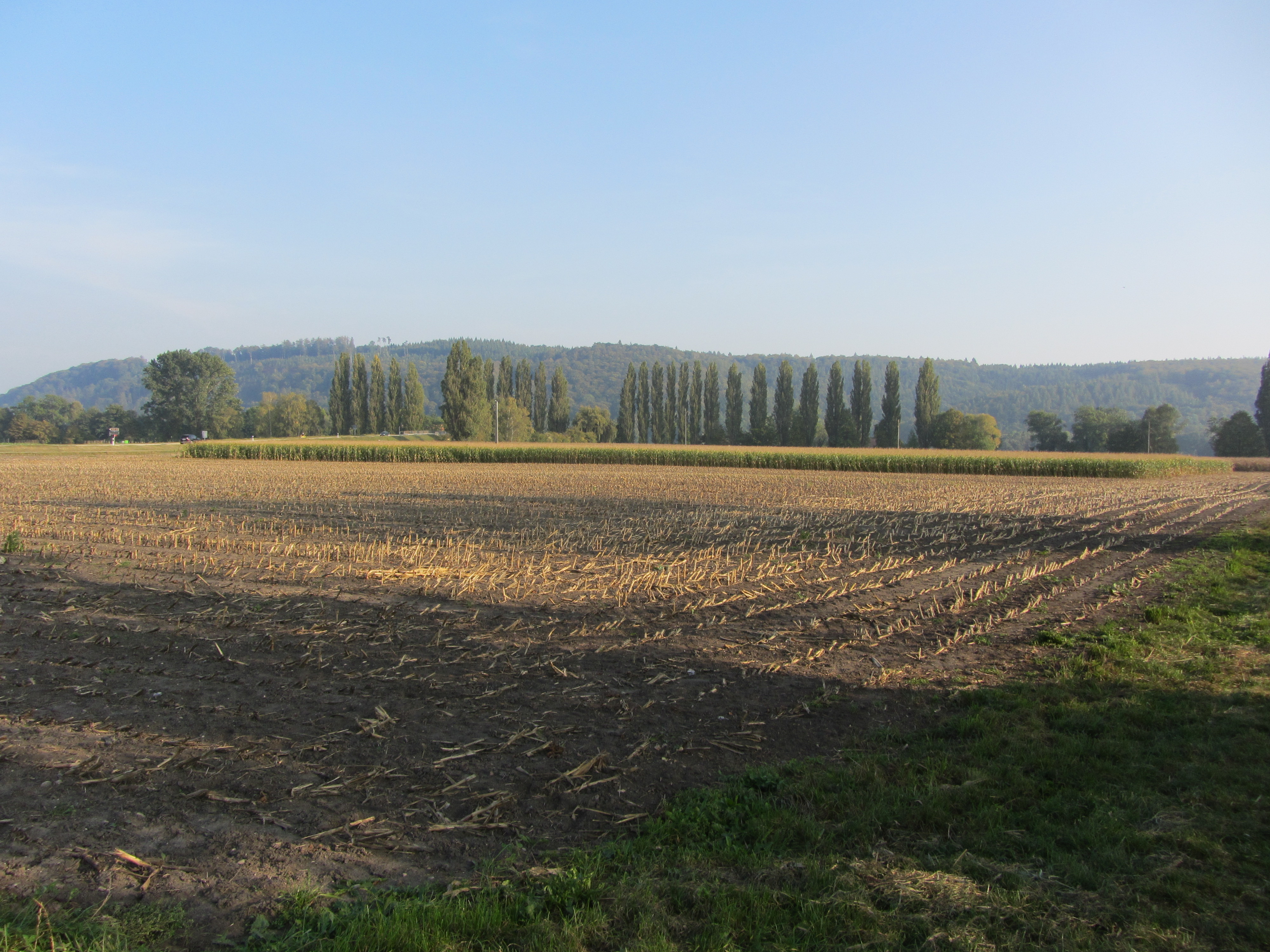
Ensemble de la Vieille Thielle

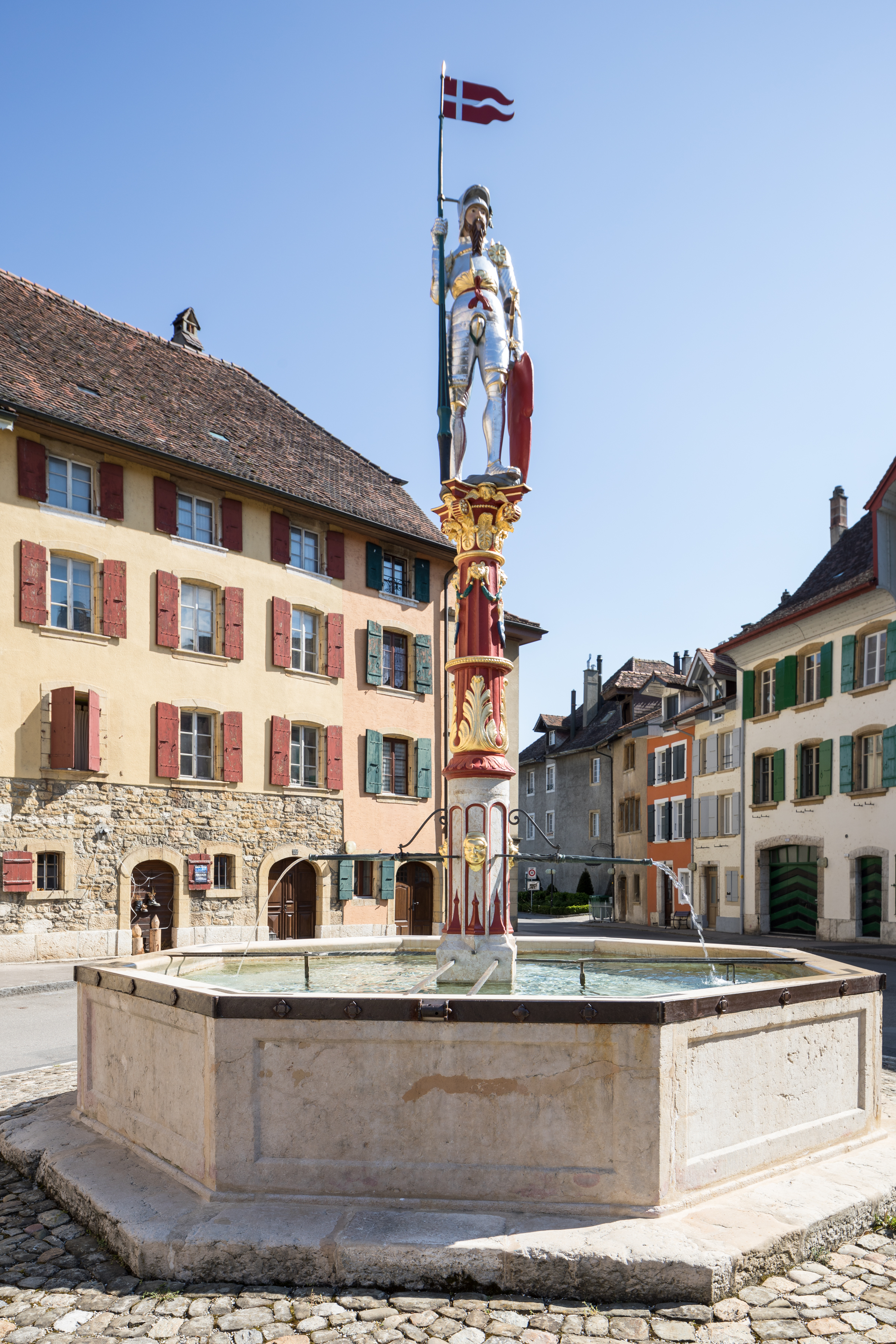
Fontaine de Saint-Maurice

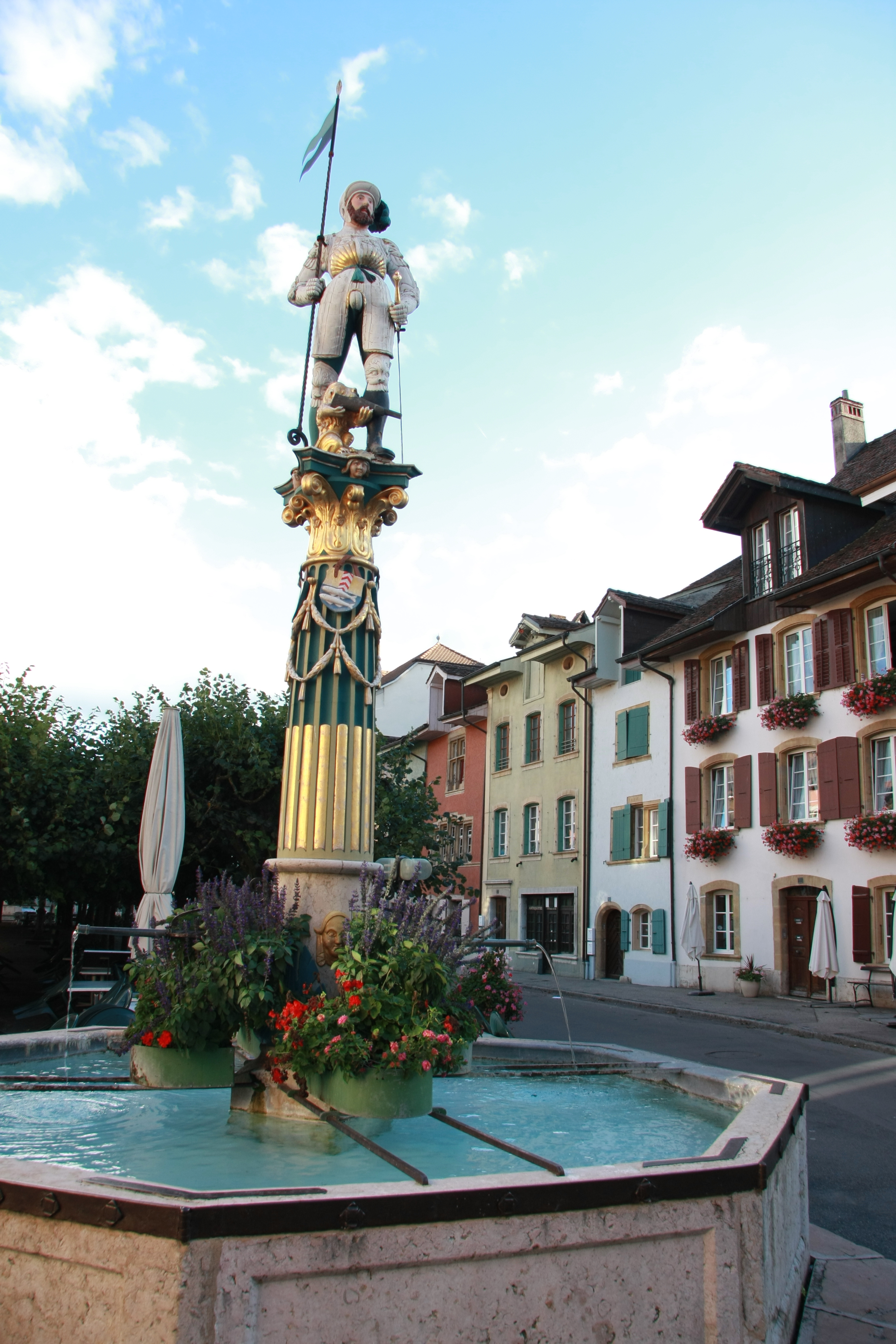
Fontaine du Vaillant

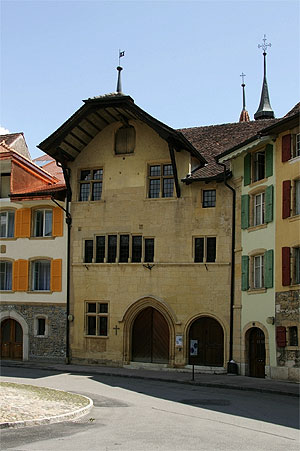
Town hall and Chapel

== Twin Town ==
Le Landeron is twinned with the town of Solothurn, Switzerland.

== Politics ==
In the 2007 federal election the most popular party was the SP which received 24.04% of the vote. The next three most popular parties were the FDP (22.69%), the SVP (21.86%) and the LPS Party (12.35%). In the federal election, a total of 1,333 votes were cast, and the voter turnout was 46.2%.

== Economy ==
As of 2010, Le Landeron had an unemployment rate of 5.6%. As of 2008, there were 60 people employed in the primary economic sector and about 21 businesses involved in this sector. 339 people were employed in the secondary sector and there were 38 businesses in this sector. 562 people were employed in the tertiary sector, with 138 businesses in this sector. There were 2,151 residents of the municipality who were employed in some capacity, of which females made up 43.7% of the workforce.

In 2008 the total number of full-time equivalent jobs was 817. The number of jobs in the primary sector was 48, of which 44 were in agriculture and 4 were in forestry or lumber production. The number of jobs in the secondary sector was 321 of which 265 or (82.6%) were in manufacturing and 53 (16.5%) were in construction. The number of jobs in the tertiary sector was 448. In the tertiary sector; 151 or 33.7% were in wholesale or retail sales or the repair of motor vehicles, 7 or 1.6% were in the movement and storage of goods, 49 or 10.9% were in a hotel or restaurant, 4 or 0.9% were in the information industry, 16 or 3.6% were the insurance or financial industry, 41 or 9.2% were technical professionals or scientists, 66 or 14.7% were in education and 54 or 12.1% were in health care.

In 2000, there were 420 workers who commuted into the municipality and 1,574 workers who commuted away. The municipality is a net exporter of workers, with about 3.7 workers leaving the municipality for every one entering. About 1.2% of the workforce coming into Le Landeron are coming from outside Switzerland. Of the working population, 11.7% used public transportation to get to work, and 68.5% used a private car.

== Religion ==
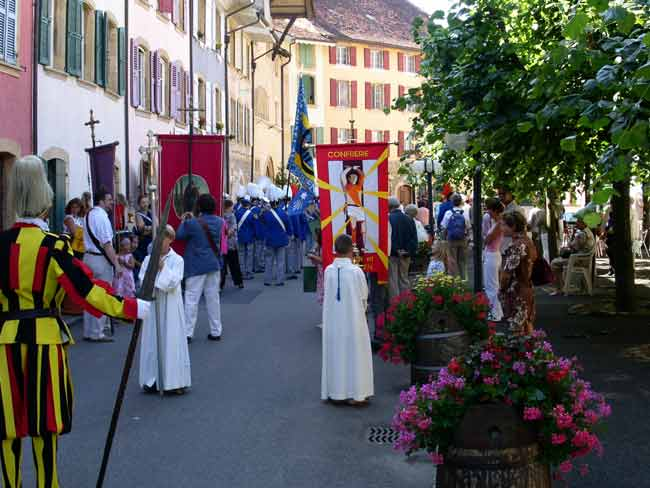
Corpus Christi parade in Le Landeron

From the 2000 census, 1,498 or 35.4% were Roman Catholic, while 1,582 or 37.4% belonged to the Swiss Reformed Church. Of the rest of the population, there were 17 members of an Orthodox church (or about 0.40% of the population), there was 1 individual who belongs to the Christian Catholic Church, and there were 286 individuals (or about 6.77% of the population) who belonged to another Christian church. There were 93 (or about 2.20% of the population) who were Islamic. There were 7 individuals who were Buddhist, 2 individuals who were Hindu and 4 individuals who belonged to another church. 695 (or about 16.44% of the population) belonged to no church, are agnostic or atheist, and 179 individuals (or about 4.23% of the population) did not answer the question.

== Education ==
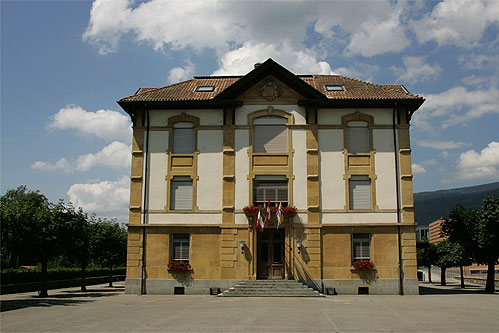
Primary school in Le Landeron

In Le Landeron about 1,574 or (37.2%) of the population have completed non-mandatory upper secondary education, and 579 or (13.7%) have completed additional higher education (either university or a Fachhochschule). Of the 579 who completed tertiary schooling, 60.6% were Swiss men, 24.0% were Swiss women, 10.2% were non-Swiss men and 5.2% were non-Swiss women.

In the canton of Neuchâtel most municipalities provide two years of non-mandatory kindergarten, followed by five years of mandatory primary education. The next four years of mandatory secondary education is provided at thirteen larger secondary schools, which many students travel out of their home municipality to attend. During the 2010–11 school year, there were 4.5 kindergarten classes with a total of 88 students in Le Landeron. In the same year, there were 13 primary classes with a total of 265 students.

As of 2000, there were 223 students in Le Landeron who came from another municipality, while 167 residents attended schools outside the municipality.
