= La Tène, Neuchâtel =

La Tène
- Former municipality
- Flag Coat of arms
- Location of La Tène
- Location within Switzerland Location within Canton of Neuchâtel
- Coordinates: 47°01′N 7°01′E
- Country: Switzerland
- Canton: Neuchâtel

Area
  - Total: 5.44 km^{2} (2.10 sq mi)
- Elevation: 450 m (1,480 ft)

Population (December 2020)
  - Total: 5,176
  - Density: 951/km^{2} (2,460/sq mi)
- Time zone: UTC+01:00 (CET)
  - Summer (DST): UTC+02:00 (CEST)
- Postal code: 2074
- SFOS number: 6461
- ISO 3166 code: CH-NE
- Surrounded by: Cudrefin (VD), Gampelen (BE), Ins (BE), Saint-Blaise, Thielle-Wavre
- Website: http://www.commune-la-tene.ch/

La Tène (French: [la tɛn]; Arpitan: La Tena) is a former municipality in the Swiss canton of Neuchâtel. On 1 January 2009, the former municipalities of Marin-Epagnier and Thielle-Wavre merged to form the new municipality of La Tène. On 1 January 2025 the former municipalities of Enges, Hauterive, Saint-Blaise and La Tène merged into the new municipality of Laténa.

The La Tène toponym was originally applied to the lakeside area near Epagnier, notable as the eponymous site of the Iron Age archaeological of the La Tène culture.

== Geography ==
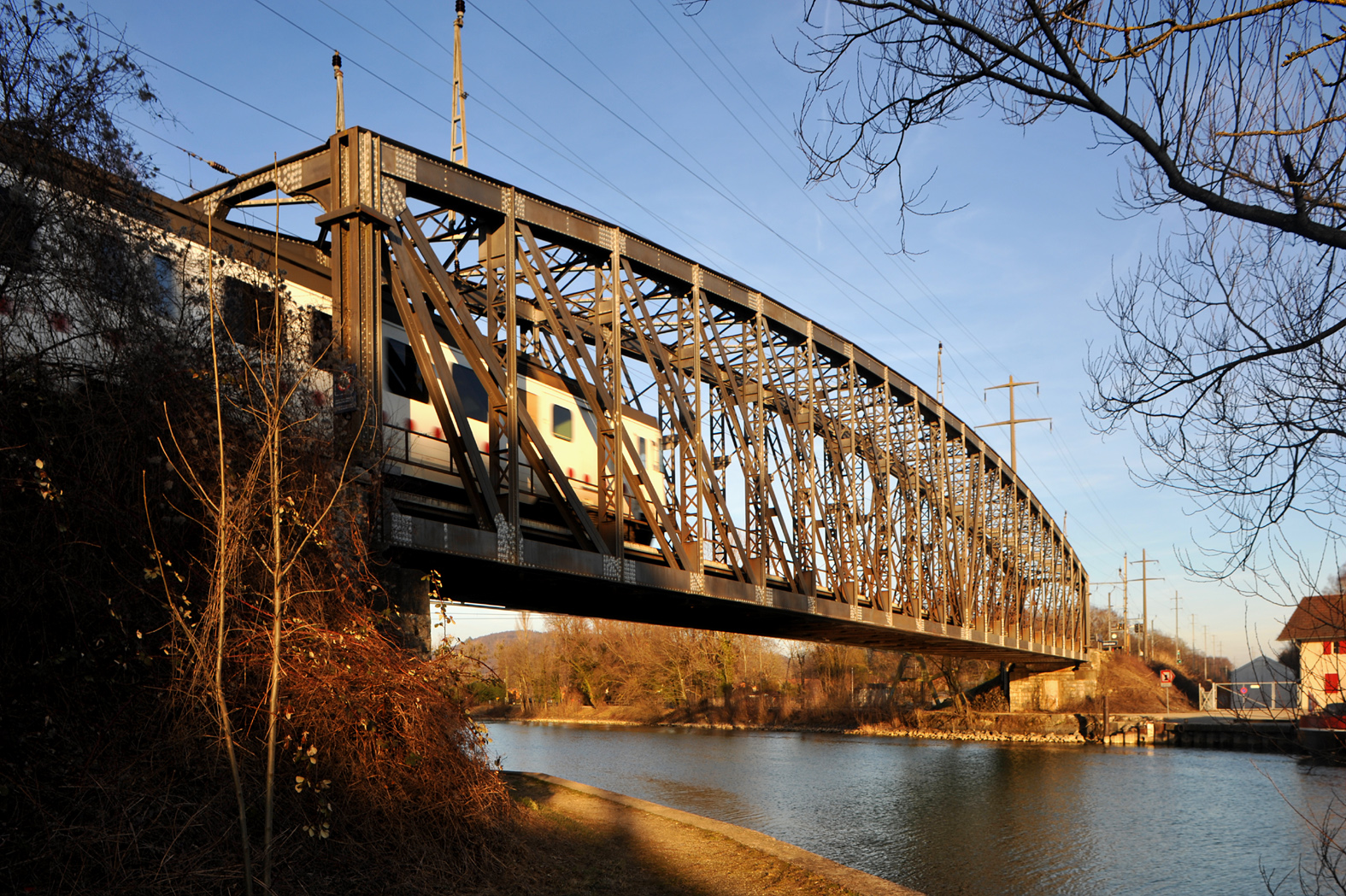
Rail bridge over the Zihl River at La Tène

La Tène has an area, as of 2009, of 5.4 square kilometers (2.1 mi^{2}). Of this area, 2.65 km^{2} (1.02 mi^{2}) or 48.7% is used for agricultural purposes, while 0.45 km^{2} (0.17 mi^{2}) or 8.3% is forested. Of the rest of the land, 2 km^{2} (1 mi^{2}) or 36.8% is settled (buildings or roads), 0.21 km^{2} (0.08 mi^{2}) or 3.9% is either rivers or lakes and 0.13 km^{2} (32.12 acres) or 2.4% is unproductive land.

Of the built up area, industrial buildings made up 6.1% of the total area while housing and buildings made up 14.2% and transportation infrastructure made up 11.9%. while parks, green belts and sports fields made up 3.9%. Out of the forested land, all of the forested land area is covered with heavy forests. Of the agricultural land, 41.9% is used for growing crops and 3.3% is pastures, while 3.5% is used for orchards or vine crops. Of the water in the municipality, 0.2% is in lakes and 3.7% is in rivers and streams.

It is located at the northeastern tip of Lake Neuchâtel at an elevation of 455 meters. It lies close to Biel/Bienne, at the boundary between French- and German-speaking regions, and at a knot of highways.

It was part of the district of Neuchâtel until the district level was eliminated on 1 January 2018.

== Demographics ==
La Tène has a population (as of December 2020) of 5,176. As of 2008, 26.0% of the population are resident foreign nationals. Over the last 10 years (2000–2010) the population has changed at a rate of 16.7%. It has changed at a rate of 12.1% due to migration and at a rate of 3.2% due to births and deaths.

Most of the population (as of 2000) speaks French (81.6%) as their first language, German is the second most common (7.2%) and Italian is the third (3.8%).

As of 2008, the population was 49.2% male and 50.8% female. The population was made up of 1,740 Swiss men (36.1% of the population) and 634 (13.1%) non-Swiss men. There were 1,871 Swiss women (38.8%) and 578 (12.0%) non-Swiss women.

As of 2000, children and teenagers (0–19 years old) make up 24.4% of the population, while adults (20–64 years old) make up 64.2% and seniors (over 64 years old) make up 11.4%.

The vacancy rate for the municipality, in 2010, was 0.1%.

== Heritage sites of national significance ==
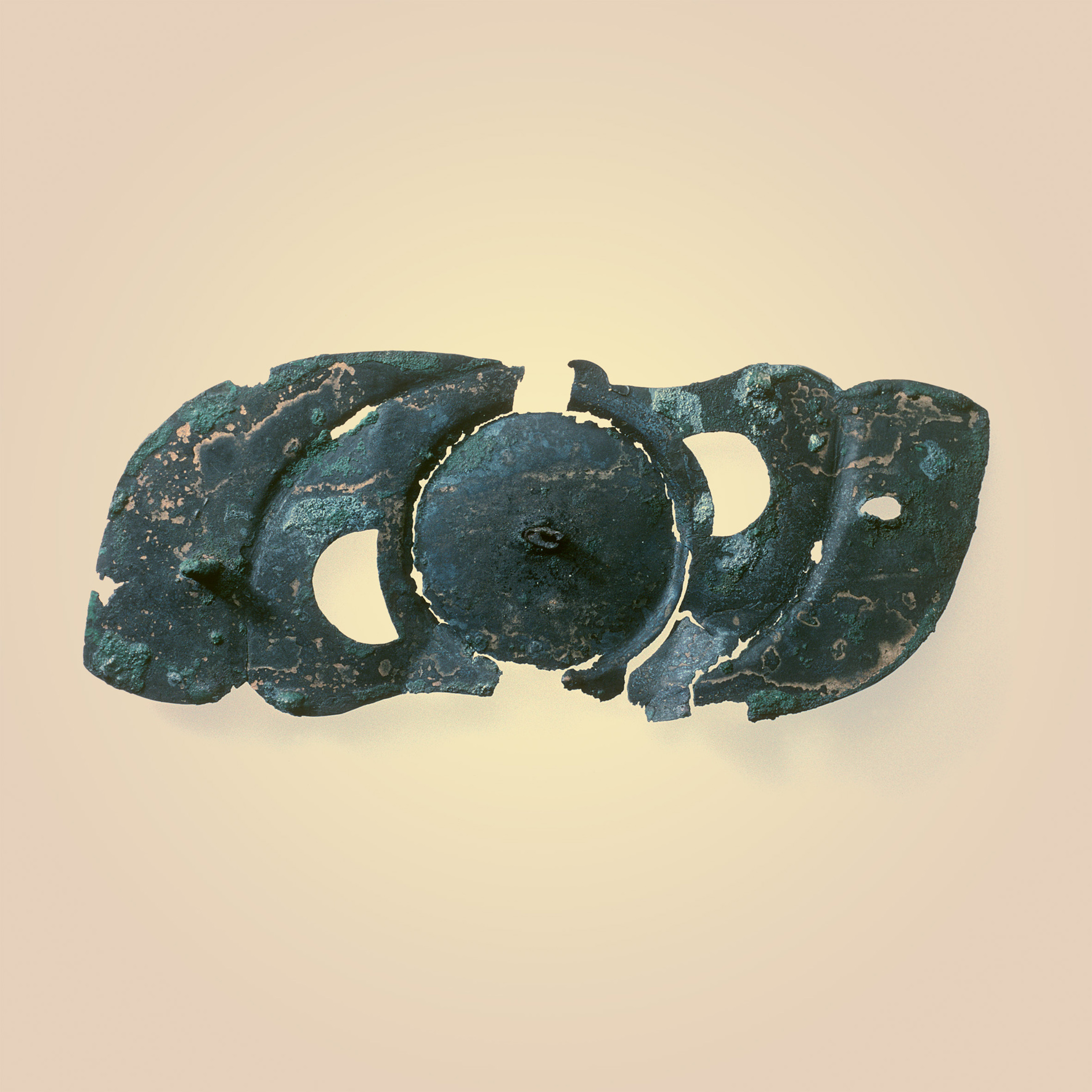
Bronze artifact from La Tène

The Clinique De Préfargier, Maison De Santé and Les Bourguignonnes-les-Perveuils in Marin-Epagnier, the La Tène culture settlement and the Les marais d‘Epagnier prehistoric and medieval sites are listed as Swiss heritage site of national significance. The Préfargier, Montmirail and Cité Martini areas are part of the Inventory of Swiss Heritage Sites.

== Economy ==
As of 2010, La Tène had an unemployment rate of 5.6%. As of 2008, there were 47 people employed in the primary economic sector and about 14 businesses involved in this sector. 1,167 people were employed in the secondary sector and there were 60 businesses in this sector. 2,867 people were employed in the tertiary sector, with 198 businesses in this sector.

Of the working population, 15.8% used public transportation to get to work, and 55.2% used a private car.
