= Laténa =

- Municipality
- Flag Coat of arms
- Location of Laténa
- Location within Switzerland Location within Canton of Neuchâtel
- Coordinates: 47°01′N 6°59′E
- Country: Switzerland
- Canton: Neuchâtel

Government
  - Mayor: Maire

Area
  - Total: 26.02 km^{2} (10.05 sq mi)

Population (December 2022)
  - Total: 11,625
  - Density: 446.8/km^{2} (1,157/sq mi)
- Time zone: UTC+01:00 (CET)
  - Summer (DST): UTC+02:00 (CEST)
- Postal code: 2068, 2072, 2073, 2074, 2075
- SFOS number: 6513
- ISO 3166 code: CH-NE
- Surrounded by: Cornaux, Cressier, Cudrefin (VD), Gampelen (BE), Ins (BE), Le Landeron, Lignières, Neuchâtel, Val-de-Ruz
- Twin towns: St. Blasien (Germany)
- Website: http://commune-latena.ch/

Laténa is a municipality in the canton of Neuchâtel in Switzerland. It was created on 1 January 2025 through the merger of Enges, Hauterive, La Tène and Saint-Blaise.
