= Lignières, Switzerland =

Municipality in the Swiss canton of Neuchâtel

Lignières
- Municipality
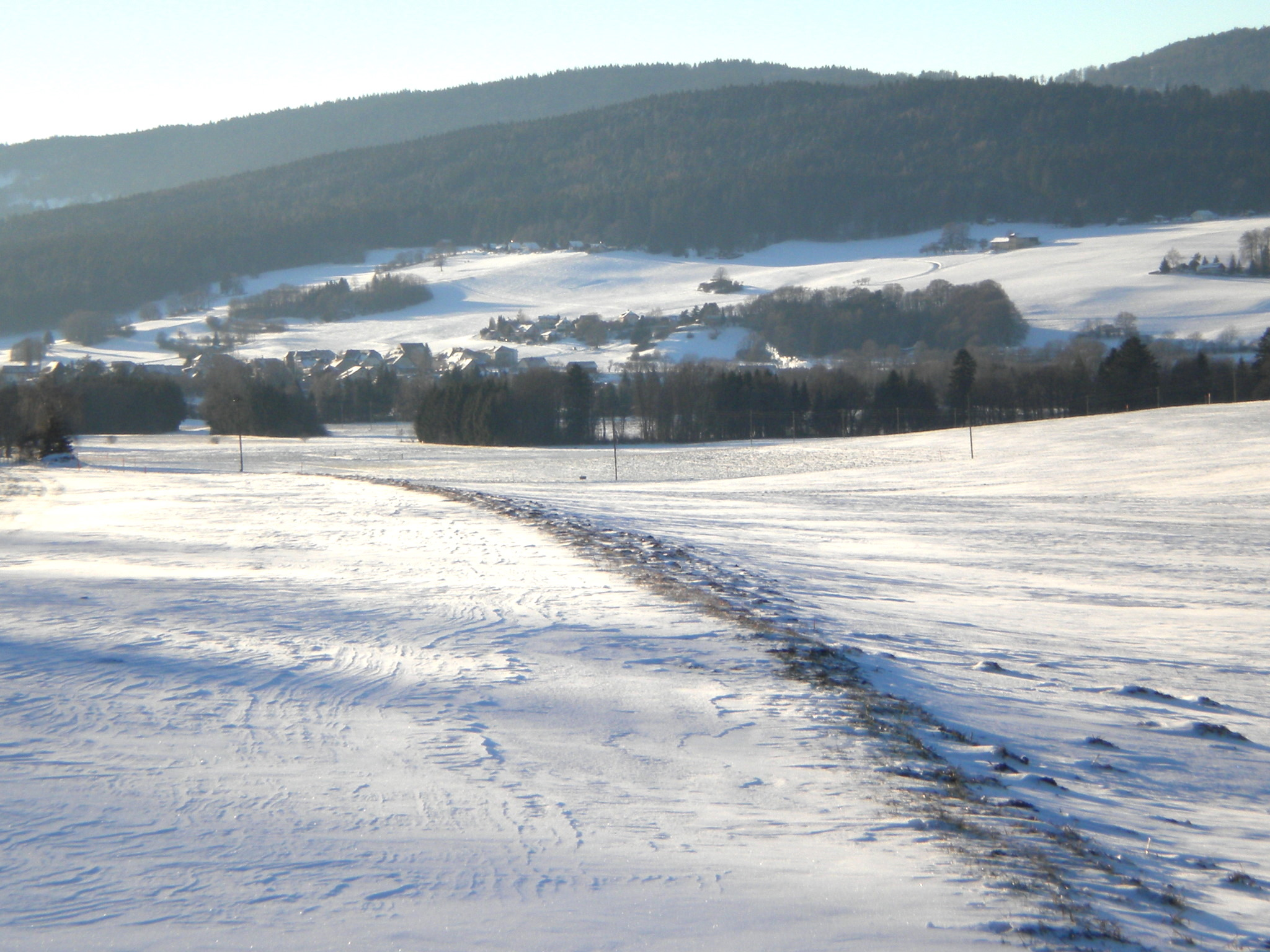
- Lignières village

- Coat of arms
- Location of Lignières
- Location within Switzerland Location within Canton of Neuchâtel
- Coordinates: 47°5′N 7°4′E
- Country: Switzerland
- Canton: Neuchâtel

Area
  - Total: 12.51 km^{2} (4.83 sq mi)
- Elevation: 802 m (2,631 ft)

Population (December 2007)
  - Total: 949
  - Density: 75.9/km^{2} (196/sq mi)
- Time zone: UTC+01:00 (CET)
  - Summer (DST): UTC+02:00 (CEST)
- Postal code: 2523
- SFOS number: 6456
- ISO 3166 code: CH-NE
- Surrounded by: La Neuveville (BE), Laténa, Le Landeron, Nods (BE), Plateau de Diesse (BE), Val-de-Ruz
- Website: www.lignieres.ch

Lignières is a municipality in the Swiss canton of Neuchâtel.

== History ==
Lignières is first mentioned in 1179 as Linieres. In 1212-20 it was mentioned as in Linieres.

== Geography ==
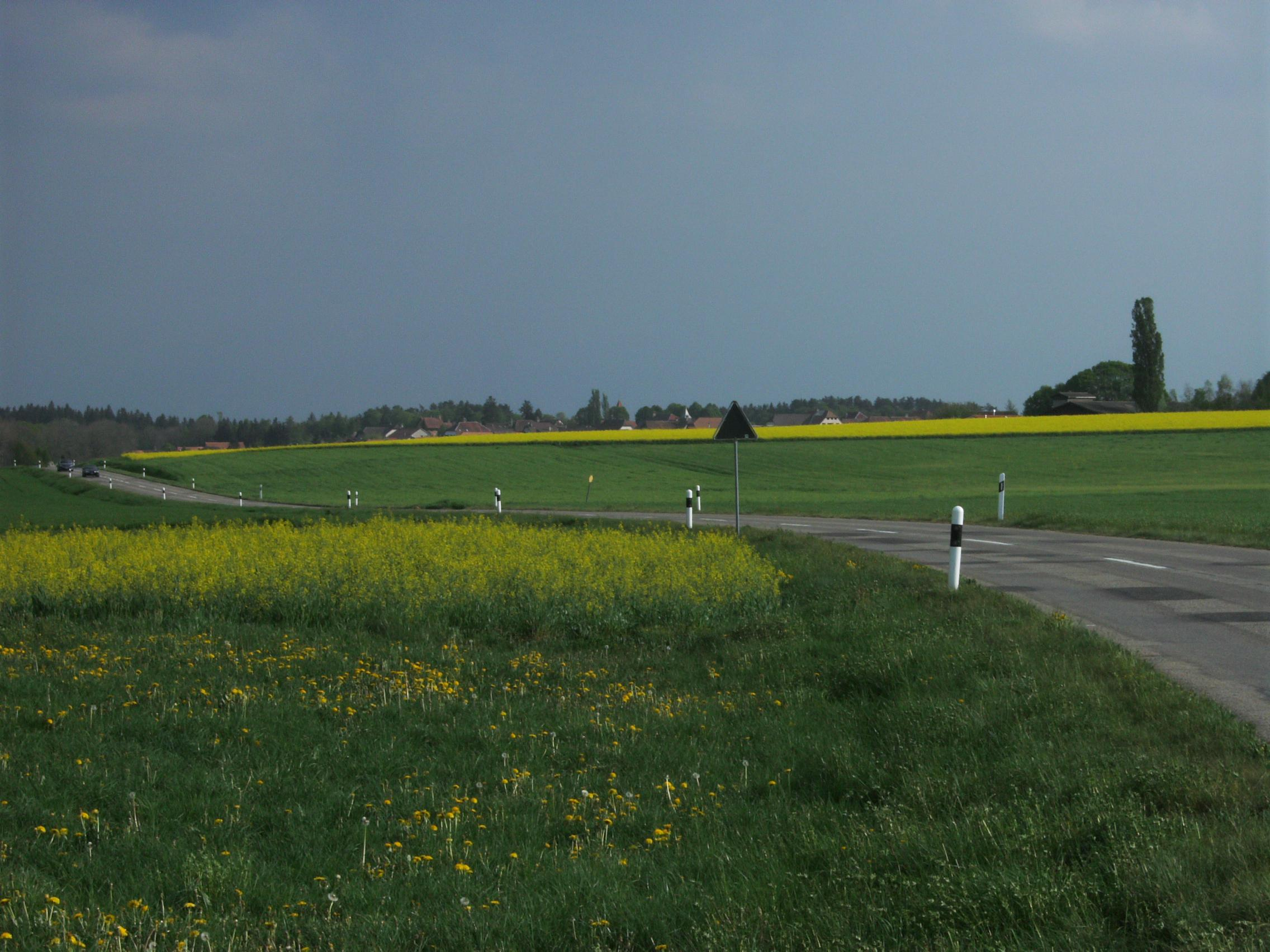
Fields outside Lignières

Lignières has an area, as of 2009, of 12.5 square kilometers (4.8 mi^{2}). Of this area, 7.62 km^{2} (2.94 mi^{2}) or 60.9% is used for agricultural purposes, while 3.98 km^{2} (1.54 mi^{2}) or 31.8% is forested. Of the rest of the land, 0.92 km^{2} (0.36 mi^{2}) or 7.4% is settled (buildings or roads).

Of the built up area, housing and buildings made up 3.1% and transportation infrastructure made up 2.6%. Out of the forested land, 30.0% of the total land area is heavily forested and 1.8% is covered with orchards or small clusters of trees. Of the agricultural land, 34.9% is used for growing crops and 19.9% is pastures and 5.6% is used for alpine pastures.

The municipality was located in the district of Neuchâtel, until the district level was eliminated on 1 January 2018. It consists of the village of Lignières, the hamlet of Le Moulin and the farm houses of Les Près sur Lignières.

== Coat of arms ==
The blazon of the municipal coat of arms is Azure, a Compass Or.

== Demographics ==
Lignières has a population (as of December 2020) of 979. As of 2008, 11.0% of the population are resident foreign nationals. Over the last 10 years (2000–2010) the population has changed at a rate of 9.8%. It has changed at a rate of 6.7% due to migration and at a rate of 10.5% due to births and deaths.

Most of the population (as of 2000) speaks French (832 or 91.0%) as their first language, German is the second most common (46 or 5.0%) and English is the third (9 or 1.0%). There are 3 people who speak Italian and 1 person who speaks Romansh.

As of 2008, the population was 50.8% male and 49.2% female. The population was made up of 433 Swiss men (45.2% of the population) and 53 (5.5%) non-Swiss men. There were 425 Swiss women (44.4%) and 46 (4.8%) non-Swiss women. Of the population in the municipality, 285 or about 31.2% were born in Lignières and lived there in 2000. There were 216 or 23.6% who were born in the same canton, while 283 or 31.0% were born somewhere else in Switzerland, and 103 or 11.3% were born outside of Switzerland.

As of 2000, children and teenagers (0–19 years old) make up 26.8% of the population, while adults (20–64 years old) make up 63.2% and seniors (over 64 years old) make up 10%.

As of 2000, there were 404 people who were single and never married in the municipality. There were 419 married individuals, 33 widows or widowers and 58 individuals who are divorced.

As of 2000, there were 340 private households in the municipality, and an average of 2.6 persons per household. There were 85 households that consist of only one person and 29 households with five or more people. In 2000, a total of 338 apartments (86.0% of the total) were permanently occupied, while 30 apartments (7.6%) were seasonally occupied and 25 apartments (6.4%) were empty. The vacancy rate for the municipality, in 2010, was 2.41%.

The historical population is given in the following chart:

== Politics ==
In the 2007 federal election the most popular party was the SVP which received 27.08% of the vote. The next three most popular parties were the SP (20.12%), the FDP (19.09%) and the LPS Party (13.03%). In the federal election, a total of 293 votes were cast, and the voter turnout was 45.8%.

== Economy ==
As of 2010, Lignières had an unemployment rate of 3.4%. As of 2008, there were 55 people employed in the primary economic sector and about 19 businesses involved in this sector. 50 people were employed in the secondary sector and there were 10 businesses in this sector. 164 people were employed in the tertiary sector, with 23 businesses in this sector. There were 512 residents of the municipality who were employed in some capacity, of which females made up 43.9% of the workforce.

In 2008 the total number of full-time equivalent jobs was 226. The number of jobs in the primary sector was 43, of which 38 were in agriculture and 4 were in forestry or lumber production. The number of jobs in the secondary sector was 47 of which 15 or (31.9%) were in manufacturing and 32 (68.1%) were in construction. The number of jobs in the tertiary sector was 136. In the tertiary sector; 13 or 9.6% were in wholesale or retail sales or the repair of motor vehicles, 78 or 57.4% were in the movement and storage of goods, 15 or 11.0% were in a hotel or restaurant, 2 or 1.5% were in the information industry, 1 was in education and 17 or 12.5% were in health care.

In 2000, there were 50 workers who commuted into the municipality and 358 workers who commuted away. The municipality is a net exporter of workers, with about 7.2 workers leaving the municipality for every one entering. Of the working population, 7% used public transportation to get to work, and 69.9% used a private car.

== Religion ==
From the 2000 census, 187 or 20.5% were Roman Catholic, while 476 or 52.1% belonged to the Swiss Reformed Church. Of the rest of the population, there was 1 member of an Orthodox church, there were 5 individuals (or about 0.55% of the population) who belonged to the Christian Catholic Church, and there were 22 individuals (or about 2.41% of the population) who belonged to another Christian church. There were 6 (or about 0.66% of the population) who were Islamic. There was 1 person who was Buddhist and 1 individual who belonged to another church. 178 (or about 19.47% of the population) belonged to no church, are agnostic or atheist, and 47 individuals (or about 5.14% of the population) did not answer the question.

== Education ==
In Lignières about 353 or (38.6%) of the population have completed non-mandatory upper secondary education, and 129 or (14.1%) have completed additional higher education (either university or a Fachhochschule). Of the 129 who completed tertiary schooling, 58.9% were Swiss men, 19.4% were Swiss women, 14.0% were non-Swiss men and 7.8% were non-Swiss women.

In the canton of Neuchâtel most municipalities provide two years of non-mandatory kindergarten, followed by five years of mandatory primary education. The next four years of mandatory secondary education is provided at thirteen larger secondary schools, which many students travel out of their home municipality to attend. During the 2010-11 school year, there were 1.5 kindergarten classes with a total of 35 students in Lignières. In the same year, there were 4 primary classes with a total of 71 students.

As of 2000, there were 3 students in Lignières who came from another municipality, while 77 residents attended schools outside the municipality.
