= List of cultural property of national significance in Switzerland: Neuchâtel =

This list contains all cultural property of national significance (class A) in the canton of Neuchâtel from the 2009 Swiss Inventory of Cultural Property of National and Regional Significance. It is sorted by municipality and contains 90 individual buildings, 17 collections and 23 archaeological finds.

The geographic coordinates provided are in the Swiss coordinate system as given in the Inventory.

== Bevaix ==
KGS No.^{?}	Picture	Name	Street Address	CH1903 X coordinate	CH1903 Y coordinate	Location
9626	Baie De Bevaix, Prehistoric Lake Shore Settlement	Baie De Bevaix, Prehistoric Lake Shore Settlement		553.000	197.000	46.922434°N 6.821565°E
9627		Treytel-A Sugiez, Neolithic Funerary and Cultural Center		551.800	197.000	46.922348°N 6.80581°E

== Boudry ==
KGS No.^{?}	Picture	Name	Street Address	CH1903 X coordinate	CH1903 Y coordinate	Location
3939	La Baume Du Four, Prehistoric Settlement	La Baume Du Four, Prehistoric Settlement		552.350	201.325	46.96129°N 6.812578°E
Unknown		ISOS petite City / bourg: Boudry				
Unknown		ISOS cas particulier: Areuse Boudry				
Unknown		ISOS cas particulier: Grandchamp				
Unknown		ISOS cas particulier: Trois Rods				

== Cornaux ==
KGS No.^{?}	Picture	Name	Street Address	CH1903 X coordinate	CH1903 Y coordinate	Location
9632	Ensemble De La Vieille Collection of Neolithic and Roman Sites	Ensemble De La Vieille; Collection of Neolithic and Roman Sites		569.000	209.000	47.031313°N 7.030809°E
10462		Gardens of the Souaillon Castle	Souaillon	567.085	208.259	47.024555°N 7.00567°E

== Cortaillod ==
KGS No.^{?}	Picture	Name	Street Address	CH1903 X coordinate	CH1903 Y coordinate	Location
4002	La Fabrique Neuve	La Fabrique Neuve	Rue De La Fabrique 2	555.806	199.516	46.945257°N 6.85816°E
9629	Le Petit Cortaillod, Prehistoric Lake Shore Settlement	Le Petit Cortaillod, Prehistoric Lake Shore Settlement		555.100	198.800	46.93877°N 6.848957°E
Unknown		ISOS village: Cortaillod				

== Cressier ==
KGS No.^{?}	Picture	Name	Street Address	CH1903 X coordinate	CH1903 Y coordinate	Location
4009	Former Church of St-Martin and Jeanjaquet Castle	Former Church of St-Martin and Jeanjaquet Castle	Route De Frochaux 27	568.649	210.927	47.04863°N 7.026058°E
9631	Ensemble de la Vieille Thielle Collection of Neolithic and Roman Sites	Ensemble de la Vieille Thielle; Collection of Neolithic and Roman Sites		570.200	210.700	47.046659°N 7.046484°E
Unknown		ISOS village: Cressier (NE)				

== Gorgier ==
KGS No.^{?}	Picture	Name	Street Address	CH1903 X coordinate	CH1903 Y coordinate	Location
4020	Gorgier Castle	Gorgier Castle	Rue Du Château 27	550.268	195.452	46.908311°N 6.785866°E
9641	La Béroche, Gallo-Roman settlement	La Béroche, Gallo-Roman settlement		549.200	194.900	46.903265°N 6.77191°E
11790	Prehistoric Lake Shore Settlement	Prehistoric Lake Shore Settlement		550.900	194.900	46.903392°N 6.794221°E

== Hauterive ==
KGS No.^{?}	Picture	Name	Street Address	CH1903 X coordinate	CH1903 Y coordinate	Location
11608	Laténium Cantonal Museum of Archeology	Laténium; Cantonal Museum of Archeology	Espace Paul Vouga	564.441	206.350	47.007248°N 6.971041°E

== La Brévine ==
KGS No.^{?}	Picture	Name	Street Address	CH1903 X coordinate	CH1903 Y coordinate	Location
3946	Double House	Double House	La Grosse Maison	532.457	202.103	46.966563°N 6.551113°E

== La Chaux-de-Fonds ==
KGS No.^{?}	Picture	Name	Street Address	CH1903 X coordinate	CH1903 Y coordinate	Location
3957	Abattoirs	Abattoirs	Rue Du Commerce 120–126	552.639	215.782	47.091349°N 6.814865°E
3951	Ancien Manège (habitation collective ouvrière depuis 1968)	Ancien Manège (habitation collective ouvrière depuis 1968)	Rue du Manège 17, 19	553.973	216.791	47.100518°N 6.832332°E
8845; 9338	Library of the City of Chaux-de-Fonds and the Département audiovisuel (DAV)	Library of the City of Chaux-de-Fonds and the Département audiovisuel (DAV)	Rue du Progrès 33	553.516	217.217	47.104318°N 6.826268°E
3960	Crematorium	Crematorium	Rue de la Charrière 106	554.635	218.240	47.113597°N 6.840906°E
9804	Domaine des Arbres	Domaine des Arbres	Rue Moïse-Perret-Gentil 37	553.978	218.098	47.112275°N 6.832265°E
3978	Farm House des Brandt	Farm House des Brandt	Les Petites-Corsettes 6	555.128	217.364	47.105752°N 6.847489°E
9803	Farm House Haute Fie, House Carrée	Farm House Haute Fie, House Carrée	Le Valanvron 9	557.162	221.094	47.139436°N 6.873931°E
9802	Farm House les Crêtets	Farm House les Crêtets	Rue des Crêtets 148	552.508	215.572	47.08945°N 6.813162°E
3965	Grand Fountain	Grand Fountain	Avenue Léopold-Robert	553.838	217.064	47.102964°N 6.830526°E
9793	Loge l‘Amitié	Loge l‘Amitié	Rue de la Loge 8	553.851	216.857	47.101103°N 6.830718°E
9795	Blanche House	Blanche House	Chemin de Pouillerel 12	552.713	217.435	47.106222°N 6.815667°E
3974; 8670	Museum des Beaux-Arts	Museum des Beaux-Arts	Rue des Musées 33	553.754	216.783	47.100431°N 6.829448°E
8766	Museum D‘Histoire Naturelle	Museum D‘Histoire Naturelle	Avenue Léopold-Robert 63	553.428	216.708	47.099734°N 6.825161°E
8671	Museum international d’horlogerie «l’homme and le temps»	Museum international d’horlogerie «l’homme and le temps»	Rue des Musées 29	553.867	216.770	47.100322°N 6.830938°E
10113	Spillmann SA	Spillmann SA	Rue du Doubs 32	553.604	217.493	47.106807°N 6.827399°E
3980	Synagogue	Synagogue	Rue du Parc 63	553.358	216.810	47.100646°N 6.824229°E
3955	Théâtre and Salle de musique	Théâtre and Salle de musique	Avenue Léopold-Robert 27–29	553.688	216.930	47.101749°N 6.828563°E
11623	Power plant	Power plant	Rue Numa-Droz 174	552.571	216.305	47.096048°N 6.813915°E
3956	Villa Anatole Schwob	Villa Anatole Schwob	Rue du Doubs 167	552.812	216.704	47.099654°N 6.817048°E
3961	Villa Fallet	Villa Fallet	Chemin de Pouillerel 1	552.789	217.302	47.105031°N 6.816682°E
3982	Villa Gallet	Villa Gallet	Rue David-Pierre-Bourquin 55	553.620	216.390	47.096887°N 6.827723°E
9794	Villa Jaquemet	Villa Jaquemet	Chemin de Pouillerel 8	552.710	217.306	47.105062°N 6.815641°E
9799	Villa Stotzer	Villa Stotzer	Chemin de Pouillerel 6	552.670	217.251	47.104564°N 6.81512°E
Unknown		UNESCO World Heritage Site: La Chaux-de-Fonds/Le Locle, Watchmaking Town Planning (since 2009)				
Unknown		ISOS ville: La Chaux-de-Fonds				

== La Chaux-du-Milieu ==
KGS No.^{?}	Picture	Name	Street Address	CH1903 X coordinate	CH1903 Y coordinate	Location
3983	Farm House Du Grand Cachot	Farm House Du Grand Cachot	Le Cachot 28	541.639	205.962	47.002144°N 6.671262°E

== La Sagne ==
KGS No.^{?}	Picture	Name	Street Address	CH1903 X coordinate	CH1903 Y coordinate	Location
9800	Double House	Double House	Les Coeudres 39	550.847	209.195	47.03197°N 6.79198°E
4121	Temple	Temple		552.781	211.382	47.051782°N 6.817194°E
Unknown		ISOS village: La Sagne				

== La Tène ==
KGS No.^{?}	Picture	Name	Street Address	CH1903 X coordinate	CH1903 Y coordinate	Location
4051		Clinique De Préfargier, Maison De Santé	Marin-Epagnier, Préfargier 6	567.309	206.223	47.006253°N 7.008763°E
9634		Les Bourguignonnes-les-Perveuils, zones cultuelles	Marin-Epagnier	567.700	207.000	47.013261°N 7.013849°E
4049	La Tène, La Tène culture Settlement	La Tène, La Tène culture Settlement		568.300	206.100	47.005194°N 7.021802°E
9633		Les marais d‘Epagnier, Prehistoric and Medieval Sites		568.700	206.800	47.01151°N 7.027014°E
Unknown		ISOS cas particulier: Cité Martini				
Unknown		ISOS cas particulier: Montmirail				
Unknown		ISOS cas particulier: Préfargier				

== Le Landeron ==
KGS No.^{?}	Picture	Name	Street Address	CH1903 X coordinate	CH1903 Y coordinate	Location
4026	Chapelle Ste-Anne	Chapelle Ste-Anne		570.418	212.029	47.058623°N 7.049266°E
9796	Croix du Bourg	Croix du Bourg	Centre Bourg	571.574	211.134	47.050623°N 7.064537°E
9630	Ensemble de la Vieille Thielle, Collection of Neolithic and Roman Era Sites	Ensemble de la Vieille Thielle, Collection of Neolithic and Roman Era Sites		571.400	210.600	47.045813°N 7.062281°E
4028	Fountain de St-Maurice	Fountain de St-Maurice	Bourg sud	571.588	211.082	47.050156°N 7.064725°E
9487	Fountain du Vaillant	Fountain du Vaillant	Bourg nord	571.570	211.177	47.05101°N 7.064482°E
4025; 8731	Town Hall with the Dix-Mille-Martyrs Chapel and Museum	Town Hall with the Dix-Mille-Martyrs Chapel and Museum	Ville 35	571.613	211.083	47.050166°N 7.065054°E
Unknown		ISOS petite City / bourg: Le Landeron				

== Le Locle ==
KGS No.^{?}	Picture	Name	Street Address	CH1903 X coordinate	CH1903 Y coordinate	Location
10493	Ancien Hôtel des Postes	Ancien Hôtel des Postes	Rue Marie-Anne-Calame 5	547.762	212.247	47.059186°N 6.751044°E
4035; 8674	Monts Castle and Museum d’horlogerie	Monts Castle and Museum d’horlogerie	Route des	547.681	212.745	47.063659°N 6.74992°E
4043	Town hall	Town hall	Avenue de l‘Hôtel-de-Ville 1	547.365	211.869	47.055755°N 6.745862°E
11624	Immeuble	Immeuble	Rue du Crêt-Vaillant 28	547.735	212.312	47.059769°N 6.750681°E
4037; 8673	Moulins souterrains du Col-des-Roches (Cave mills in the Col des Roches)	Moulins souterrains du Col-des-Roches (Cave mills in the Col des Roches)	Col-des-Roches 25	545.493	211.137	47.049019°N 6.721312°E
4047	Villa Favre-Jacot	Villa Favre-Jacot	La Côte-des-Billodes 6	546.480	211.716	47.054308°N 6.734233°E
10114	Zenith SA	Zenith SA	Rue des Billodes 30–38/ Rue de la Côte 37, 39, 41	546.955	211.813	47.055218°N 6.740473°E
Unknown		UNESCO World Heritage Site: La Chaux-de-Fonds/Le Locle, Watchmaking Town Planning (since 2009)				
Unknown		ISOS ville: Le Locle				
Unknown		ISOS village urbanisé: Les Brenets				

== Les Verrières ==
KGS No.^{?}	Picture	Name	Street Address	CH1903 X coordinate	CH1903 Y coordinate	Location
Unknown		ISOS village: Les Verrières				

== Milvignes ==
KGS No.^{?}	Picture	Name	Street Address	CH1903 X coordinate	CH1903 Y coordinate	Location
9624	Baie D‘Auvernier, Prehistoric Lake Shore Settlement	Baie D‘Auvernier, Prehistoric Lake Shore Settlement		557.100	202.600	46.973083°N 6.874864°E
3929	Auvernier Castle	Auvernier Castle	Place des Epancheurs 4, 6	557.250	202.784	46.974747°N 6.876818°E
9091		Arsenal	Route De L‘Arsenal 2	556.145	201.800	46.965824°N 6.862392°E
9625	Baie d‘Auvernier, Prehistoric Lake Shore Settlement	Baie d‘Auvernier, Prehistoric Lake Shore Settlement		556.800	202.250	46.969915°N 6.870955°E
3986; 8672	Colombier Castle and Museum militaire et des toiles peintes Villa romaine, fortifications / château médiéval	Colombier Castle and Museum militaire et des toiles peintes Villa romaine, fortifications / château médiéval		556.203	201.846	46.966242°N 6.86315°E
3988	Domaine de Vaudijon	Domaine de Vaudijon	Chemin de Notre-Dame 30	555.894	201.182	46.960249°N 6.859154°E
3987	House de maître du Bied	House de maître du Bied	Allée du Bied 48	556.940	200.904	46.957817°N 6.872923°E
3989	Manoir Le Pontet	Manoir Le Pontet	Chemin du Pontet 2	556.094	201.999	46.967611°N 6.861703°E
Unknown		ISOS village: Auvernier				
Unknown		ISOS village urbanisé: Colombier				
Unknown		ISOS cas particulier: Areuse (Boudry				

== Neuchâtel ==
KGS No.^{?}	Picture	Name	Street Address	CH1903 X coordinate	CH1903 Y coordinate	Location
9798	Abbey De Fontaine-André	Abbey De Fontaine-André	Chemin De L‘Abbaye 51	563.334	206.687	47.010219°N 6.956457°E
9340	Pasteur Library of Neuchâtel	Pasteur Library of Neuchâtel		561.733	204.986	46.994828°N 6.935547°E
4059; 8783	Neuchâtel Castle and Archives de l‘Etat de Neuchâtel	Neuchâtel Castle and Archives de l‘Etat de Neuchâtel	Rue de la Collégiale 12	561.060	204.691	46.992135°N 6.926724°E
4071; 9339; 8964	Collège Latin, Library publique and universitaire de Neuchâtel	Collège Latin, Library publique and universitaire de Neuchâtel	Place Numa-Droz 3	561.398	204.472	46.990185°N 6.931186°E
4060	Collegiate Church of Neuchâtel and cénotaphe	Collegiate Church of Neuchâtel and cénotaphe	Rue de la Collégiale 5	561.023	204.671	46.991953°N 6.92624°E
4075	Notre-Dame Church	Notre-Dame Church	Rue Ed.-Desor 1	562.185	204.959	46.994611°N 6.941491°E
4081	Fountain de la Justice	Fountain de la Justice	Rue de l‘Hôpital	561.245	204.663	46.991894°N 6.929159°E
4080	Fountain de la place de l‘Hôtel de Ville	Fountain de la place de l‘Hôtel de Ville		561.413	204.666	46.991931°N 6.931367°E
4084	Fountain de la rue des Moulins	Fountain de la rue des Moulins	Passage des Boucheries	561.185	204.708	46.992295°N 6.928366°E
4078	Fountain de la rue du Château	Fountain de la rue du Château	Rue du Château	561.025	204.613	46.991432°N 6.926271°E
4077	Fountain du Banneret	Fountain du Banneret	Rue Fleury	561.186	204.634	46.99163°N 6.928385°E
4079	Fountain du Griffon	Fountain du Griffon	Rue du Pommier	561.116	204.636	46.991644°N 6.927465°E
4083	Fountain du Lion	Fountain du Lion	Rue du Temple Neuf	561.295	204.580	46.99115°N 6.929823°E
4082	Fountain du Neubourg	Fountain du Neubourg	Fountain du Neubourg	561.255	204.754	46.992713°N 6.929282°E
10116	Fortifications	Fortifications		561.200	204.650	46.991775°N 6.928568°E
4064	Galeries de l‘Histoire	Galeries de l‘Histoire	Avenue Du Peyrou 7	561.557	204.914	46.99417°N 6.933239°E
4088	Grande Rochette	Grande Rochette	Avenue de la Gare 24	561.618	205.071	46.995586°N 6.934027°E
4061	City Hall	City Hall	Rue de l‘Hôtel-de-Ville 2	561.362	204.646	46.991748°N 6.930698°E
4062	Hôtel Du Peyrou	Hôtel Du Peyrou	Avenue Du Peyrou 1, 3	561.588	204.898	46.994028°N 6.933648°E
4063	Maison Des Halles	Maison Des Halles	Rue du Trésor 4	561.204	204.581	46.991154°N 6.928627°E
4092	House	House	Rue du Pommier 7	561.098	204.603	46.991346°N 6.927231°E
9500	House	House	Rue du Pommier 8 / Rue du Château 19	561.067	204.615	46.991452°N 6.926823°E
9501	House	House	Rue du Pommier 9	561.078	204.588	46.99121°N 6.92697°E
9637	Monruz Paleolithic open-air settlement	Monruz; Paleolithic open-air settlement		563.670	205.900	47.003158°N 6.960938°E
4065; 8702; 8968	Museum d‘art and d‘histoire de Neuchâtel	Museum d‘art and d‘histoire de Neuchâtel	Esplanade Léopold-Robert 1	561.725	204.616	46.991499°N 6.935473°E
8675	Museum d‘ethnographie	Museum d‘ethnographie	Rue de Saint-Nicolas 2	560.654	204.497	46.990366°N 6.921404°E
8676	Muséum d‘histoire naturelle	Muséum d‘histoire naturelle	Rue des Terreaux 14	561.364	204.782	46.992971°N 6.930713°E
4094	Observatoire cantonal	Observatoire cantonal	Rue de l‘Observatoire 52	563.058	205.559	47.000057°N 6.952919°E
4089	Parc de la Petite Rochette	Parc de la Petite Rochette	Avenue de la Gare	561.430	204.930	46.994307°N 6.931568°E
10118	Poste	Poste	Place Numa-Droz 2	561.464	204.553	46.990917°N 6.932047°E
4108	Tour des prisons and former prison	Tour des prisons and former prison		560.999	204.587	46.991196°N 6.925931°E
4066	Villa James de Pury and a building with murals of Hans Erni	Villa James de Pury and a building with murals of Hans Erni	Rue de Saint-Nicolas 4	560.568	204.539	46.990739°N 6.92027°E
4139	Valangin Castle	Valangin Castle		559.558	207.197	47.014587°N 6.906756°E
4142	Collégiale (temple)	Collégiale (temple)	Place de la Collégiale; Valangin	559.580	207.373	47.016171°N 6.90703°E
Unknown		ISOS City: Neuchâtel				
Unknown		ISOS Urban village: Corcelles				
Unknown		ISOS petite City / bourg: Valangin				
Unknown		ISOS cas particulier: Bussy / Le Sorgereux				
Unknown		ISOS cas particulier: La Borcarderie				

== Rochefort ==
KGS No.^{?}	Picture	Name	Street Address	CH1903 X coordinate	CH1903 Y coordinate	Location
4119	Cotencher, Paleolithic Cave	Cotencher, Paleolithic Cave		551.585	201.600	46.963709°N 6.802498°E

== Saint-Aubin-Sauges ==
KGS No.^{?}	Picture	Name	Street Address	CH1903 X coordinate	CH1903 Y coordinate	Location
9640	Le Béroche, Gallo-Romain Settlement	Le Béroche, Gallo-Romain Settlement		548.900	194.700	46.901443°N 6.767996°E
9639	Port Conty / Tivoli, Neolithic Settlement	Port Conty / Tivoli, Neolithic Settlement		549.000	193.300	46.888857°N 6.769465°E

== Saint-Blaise ==
KGS No.^{?}	Picture	Name	Street Address	CH1903 X coordinate	CH1903 Y coordinate	Location
Unknown		ISOS village urbanisé: Saint-Blaise				

== Val-de-Ruz ==
KGS No.^{?}	Picture	Name	Street Address	CH1903 X coordinate	CH1903 Y coordinate	Location
3985		Farm House	Rue Jean-Labran 4	560.701	212.814	47.065179°N 6.921301°E
10109		Farm House	Rue Jean-Labran 6	560.648	212.814	47.065176°N 6.920603°E
10110		Farm House Aux Planches	Les Planches 52, 56	563.912	215.104	47.08596°N 6.963387°E
4014	Engollon Church	Engollon Church	Village	560.692	209.801	47.038077°N 6.921444°E
4013	La Bonneville Abandoned Village	La Bonneville; Abandoned Village		560.250	209.400	47.034444°N 6.915664°E
4017	Moulin de Bayerel	Moulin de Bayerel	Route de Bayerel	561.332	210.031	47.040184°N 6.929845°E
Unknown		ISOS village: Dombresson				

== Val-de-Travers ==
KGS No.^{?}	Picture	Name	Street Address	CH1903 X coordinate	CH1903 Y coordinate	Location
10108	Farm House no. 1201, Monlési	Farm House no. 1201, Monlési	Boveresse	535.450	197.726	46.927491°N 6.59106°E
9791	House des Chats, House Petitpierre	House des Chats, House Petitpierre	Boveresse	536.073	196.480	46.916344°N 6.599414°E
9792	Séchoir à absinthe	Séchoir à absinthe	Boveresse, Route de Môtiers	536.250	196.545	46.916945°N 6.601729°E
4054	Ivernois Castle, Maison Boy de la Tour	Ivernois Castle, Maison Boy de la Tour	Môtiers, Grande Rue 7	537.016	195.816	46.910461°N 6.611885°E
4052	Hôtel des Six-Communes	Hôtel des Six-Communes	Môtiers, Rue Centrale 1	536.962	195.905	46.911257°N 6.611164°E
4055; 9638	Prieuré / Prieuré St-Pierre High Middle Ages Church	Prieuré / Prieuré St-Pierre; High Middle Ages Church	Môtiers, Rue Centrale 7	537.030	195.942	46.911596°N 6.612051°E
4056	Temple	Temple	Môtiers, Ruelle du Temple	537.010	195.970	46.911846°N 6.611785°E
4136	Areuse Bridge	Areuse Bridge	Travers	541.675	198.869	46.938347°N 6.672645°E
Unknown		ISOS village: Buttes				
Unknown		ISOS village: Les Verrières				
Unknown		ISOS village: Môtiers				
Unknown		ISOS village urbanisé: Couvet				
Unknown		ISOS village urbanisé: Fleurier				
Unknown		ISOS village urbanisé: Travers				

== Vaumarcus ==
KGS No.^{?}	Picture	Name	Street Address	CH1903 X coordinate	CH1903 Y coordinate	Location
9642		La Redoute Des Bourguignons, Prehistoric Site / Hallstatt Tumulus		547.000	192.450	46.881055°N 6.743323°E
