= Synagogue of La Chaux-de-Fonds =

Synagogue in the canton of Neuchâtel, Switzerland

- French: Synagogue de La Chaux-de-Fonds
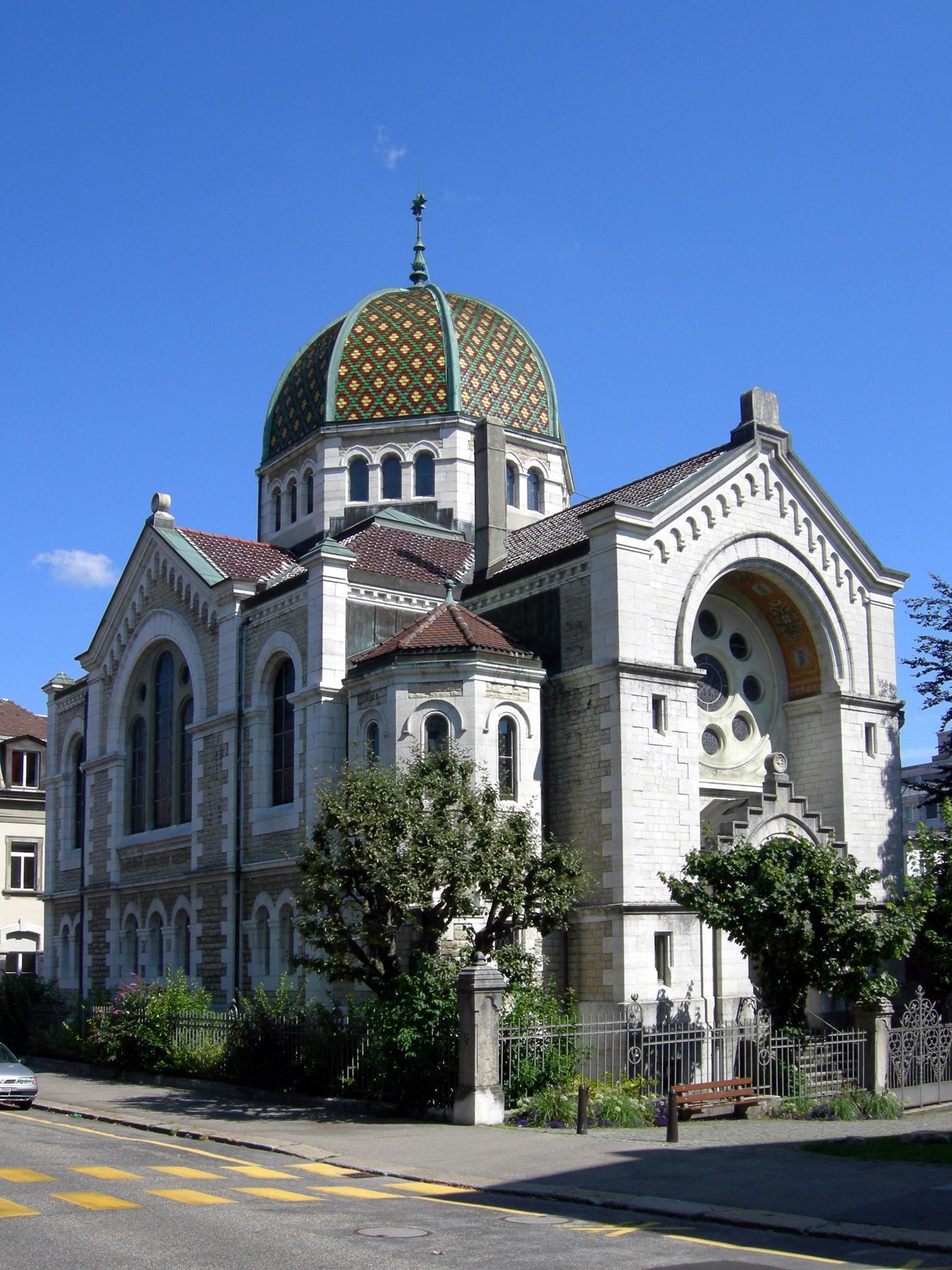
- The synagogue in 2008

- Location of the synagogue in the Canton of Neuchâtel

Religion
- Affiliation: Judaism
- Rite: Nusach Ashkenaz
- Ecclesiastical or organizational status: Synagogue
- Ownership: Israelitische Kultusgemeinde Baden
- Status: Active

Location
- Location: 63 Rue du Parc, La Chaux-de-Fonds, Canton of Neuchâtel
- Country: Switzerland
- Interactive map of Synagogue of La Chaux-de-Fonds
- Coordinates: 47°06′03″N 06°49′27″E

Architecture
- Architect: Richard Kuder
- Type: Synagogue architecture
- Style: Byzantine Revival; Romanesque Revival
- Established: 1830s (as a congregation)
- Groundbreaking: 1894
- Completed: 1896

Specifications
- Dome: One
- Dome height (outer): 32 m (105 ft)
- Materials: Brick

Swiss Cultural Property of National Significance
- Official name: Synagogue
- Reference no.: 3980

The Synagogue of La Chaux-de-Fonds (French: Synagogue de La Chaux-de-Fonds) is a Jewish congregation and synagogue, located at 63 Rue du Parc, in La Chaux-de-Fonds, in the Canton of Neuchâtel, Switzerland.

The synagogue was opened in 1896 and was listed among the Cultural Property of National Significance. It is also part of the La Chaux-de-Fonds 19th-century urban ensemble listed as a World Heritage Site.

== Architecture ==
The synagogue was built in a Byzantine Revival style with Romanesque Revival elements. The cross-shaped casement is topped by a 32 m high (105 ft) cupola. The interior of the building is adorned with rich paintings. The organ, made by Kuhn from Männedorf, is no longer in service.

== History ==
In 1833, the Jewish community of La Chaux-de-Fonds started worshipping in a private residency. A first synagogue was built in 1863 and consecrated by Rabbi Moïse Nordmann from Hégenheim, Alsace.

The new synagogue was built between 1894 and 1896 by architect Richard Kuder. The foundation stone of the new building was laid on June 28, 1894. The synagogue was consecrated On May 13, 1896, by Rabbi Jules Wolff.

== See also ==
- History of the Jews in Switzerland
- List of cultural property of national significance in Switzerland: Neuchâtel
- List of synagogues in Switzerland

== Bibliography ==
- Epstein-Mil, Ron. Die Synagogen der Schweiz. Bauten zwischen Emanzipation, Assimilation und Akkulturation: Fotografien von Michael Richter (in German).
- Beiträge zur Geschichte und Kultur der Juden in der Schweiz. Schriftenreihe des Schweizerischen Israelitischen Gemeindebunds. Vol. 13. Zürich: Chronos Verlag. 2008. pp. 222–227. ISBN 9783034013987.
