= Moïse Nordmann =

- Print or Photograph of M. Nordmann after a lithograph by G. Wolf.
- Born: 20 September 1809; Hégenheim, Swiss Confederation
- Died: 24 April 1884 (aged 74); Basel, Switzerland
- Occupations: Rabbi, author

Moïse Nordmann (20 September 1809 in Hégenheim - 24 April 1884 in Basel) was an Alsatian rabbi and author of poems and scientific essays.

== Life ==
Moïse Nordmann was the son of the well-off cattle dealer Emmanuel Nordmann and his wife Madelaine Didisheim. Moïse attended a secondary school in Nancy, during which time he mastered both German and French. In 1828 he enrolled at the University of Heidelberg, where he lived with Rabbi Salomon Fürst. He continued his studies at the University of Würzburg with Abraham Bing. From the 6th of July 1834, Nordmann became rabbi in his home town, Hégenheim. He was the rabbi of this community until his death in 1884. At the time, he was the only rabbi in Alsace who had not attended the École centrale rabbinique de Metz.

In 1848, Moïse Nordmann organised resistance against the anti-Jewish riots in Hégenheim. He was a moderate representative of liberal Judaism, and was against having organs and decorative leaded glass windows in the synagogue. At the same time, he advocated schooling for girls. He was one of the co-founders of the Jewish care home for the elderly in Hegenheim. In 1865 he consecrated the synagogue in Bern, in 1863 the synagogue in La Chaux-de-Fonds and in 1865 the synagogue in Avenches. In 1868, he consecrated the second and current synagogue in Basel.

Nordmann also played an important role for Jews in Switzerland, who faced many discriminatory measures at the time. Switzerland was interested in a trade agreement with France, but the discrimination against Jews stood in the way. At this important time, Nordmann showed the American diplomat Theodor S. Fay around the local Jewish communities, pointing out the difficulties they faced. Fay's subsequent piece on the discrimination against Jews was quite influential in the fight for freedom of movement for Jews in Switzerland.
