= Philip Sherman =

Philip Sherman may refer to:

- Philip Sherman (settler) (1611–1687), founder of Portsmouth, Rhode Island
- Philip Sherman (rabbi) (1956–2023), American rabbi and mohel
