= Theodore Sedgwick Fay =

American diplomat

Theodore S. Fay
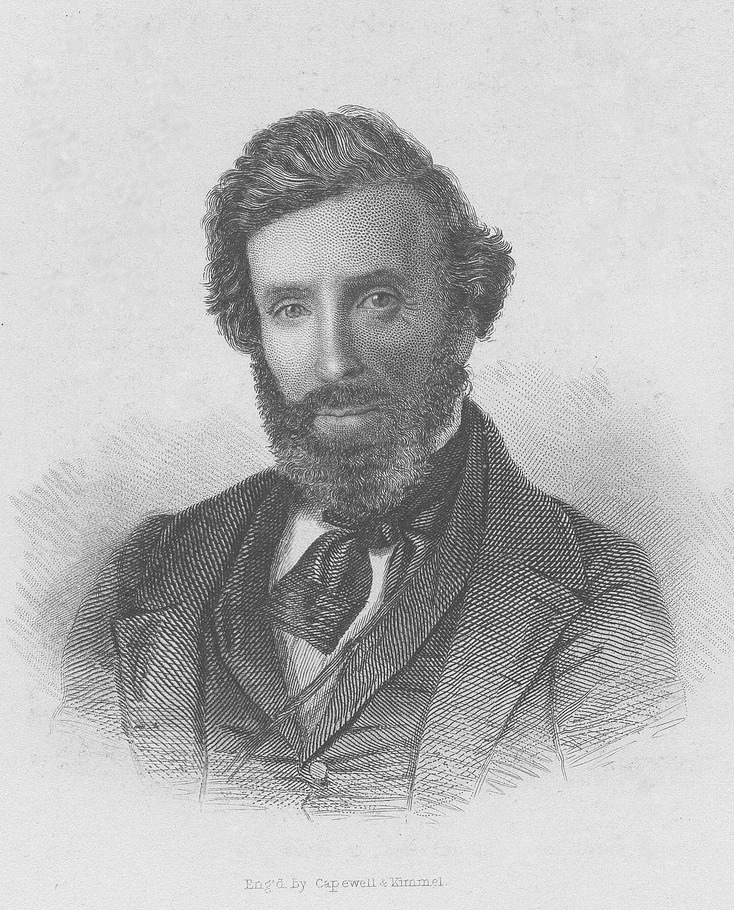
- Born: February 10, 1807; New York City, New York, U.S.
- Died: November 17, 1898 (aged 91); Berlin, German Empire
- Occupations: Writer; journalist; diplomat

Theodore Sedgwick Fay (February 10, 1807 – November 17, 1898) was an American writer who spent much of his life in Germany.

== Biography ==
Fay initially worked as a clerk for his father, an attorney. His father died in 1825, and he continued long enough in law to be admitted to the bar in 1828, but he quickly left the legal profession for periodical journalism, where he made a name for himself for some years. To this period belongs his book Dreams and Reveries of a Quiet Man (2 vols., 1832), which contained papers he had written for the New York Mirror, where he was an editor beginning in 1828. He married Laura Gardenier in 1833 and went traveling in Europe for three years while sending back articles to the Mirror. He served with ability in the United States diplomatic service, first as secretary of the legation at London briefly (1837), then at Berlin (1837–53), and next (1853–61) as Minister at Bern, Switzerland.

In 1859, Fay delivered a report to the Swiss Federal Council that was to be considerably influential in the struggle for the emancipation of Jews in Switzerland. The "Denkschrift betreffend die Zulassung der nordamerikanischen Israeliten zur Niederlassung in der Schweiz" (Memorandum concerning the admission of North American Israelites to settle in Switzerland) gave an overview of the existing discriminatory laws against Jews in Switzerland, also going into great depths to refute all arguments that supported these laws. Fay had visited many Jewish communities in the region under the guidance of Rabbi Moïse Nordmann of Hegenheim. Following this report, which had been printed and distributed to the Swiss cantons, small changes were undertaken on the cantonal level, contributing on a larger scale to the eventual emancipation of the Jews in Switzerland in 1866.

Fay retired from his diplomatic career in 1861. He then moved to Berlin. His first wife died while he was at Bern, and he later married a German woman.

== Works ==
Other works include:

- Views in New-York and its environs, from accurate, characteristic & picturesque drawings, taken on the spot, expressly for this work (New York: Peabody & Co., 1831). With James H. Dakin. A collection of engravings with commentary by Fay.
- Norman Leslie: A Tale of the Present Times (2 vols., 1835) Some say this book was a best seller until it received a poor review from Edgar Allan Poe. However, others say sales of the book were increased by the controversy Poe's review ignited. Louisa H. Medina adapted the book into a successful play.
- Sydney Clifton (1839)
- The Countess Ida (1841) A didactic novel criticizing the practice of dueling.
- Hoboken, a Romance (1843) Another didactic novel on the dueling theme.
- Ulric, a poem (1851) Looks at the impact of Lutheranism on a German captain.
- Views of Christianity (1856)
- A Great Outline of Geography (2 vols., 1867) A textbook.
- First Steps in Geography (1873) A textbook.
- Die Sklavenmacht: Blicke in die Geschichte der Vereinigten Staaten von Amerika ("The slave power: a look into the history of the United States of America," Berlin, 1865) Written to respond to criticism.
- Die Alabama-Frage ("The Alabama Question," Leipzig, 1872) Also written in response to criticism.
- The Three Germanys (2 vols., 1889) Political history.
- History of Switzerland

He also wrote for periodicals throughout his life.
