= Neuchâtel District =

Coordinates: 46°59′25″N 6°55′50″E

Neuchâtel District District de Neuchâtel
- District
- Country: Switzerland
- Canton: Neuchâtel
- Capital: Neuchâtel
- Dissolved: 1 January 2018

Area
  - Total: 80.02 km^{2} (30.90 sq mi)

Population (2017)
  - Total: 53,744
  - Density: 671.6/km^{2} (1,740/sq mi)
- Time zone: UTC+1 (CET)
  - Summer (DST): UTC+2 (CEST)
- Municipalities: 9

Neuchâtel District was one of the six districts of the canton of Neuchâtel, Switzerland, until the district level was eliminated on 1 January 2018. The district capital was the town of Neuchâtel. It had a population of 53,744.

== Municipalities ==
Neuchâtel contains a total of nine municipalities:

Coat of Arms	Municipality	Population (31 December 2020)	Area km^{2}
Cornaux	Cornaux	1,587	4.72
Cressier	Cressier	1,892	8.55
Enges	Enges	266	9.59
Hauterive	Hauterive	2,636	2.12
La Tène	La Tène	5,176	5.44
Le Landeron	Le Landeron	4,642	10.31
Lignières	Lignières	979	12.51
Neuchâtel	Neuchâtel	33,455	18.1
Saint-Blaise	Saint-Blaise	3,258	8.87
	Total	53,744	80.21

== Mergers ==
- On 1 January 1966 the municipality of Landeron-Combes changed its name to Le Landeron.
- On 1 January 2009, Marin-Epagnier and Thielle-Wavre merged to form the new municipality of La Tène.

== Demographics ==
Most of the population (as of 2000) speaks French (41,547 or 80.4%) as their first language, German is the second most common (3,127 or 6.1%) and Italian is the third (2,015 or 3.9%). There are 17 people who speak Romansh.

As of 2008, the population was 48.2% male and 51.8% female. The population was made up of 17,772 Swiss men (33.8% of the population) and 7,594 (14.4%) non-Swiss men. There were 20,440 Swiss women (38.9%) and 6,782 (12.9%) non-Swiss women.

Of the population in the district, 12,636 or about 24.4% were born in Neuchâtel and lived there in 2000. There were 10,146 or 19.6% who were born in the same canton, while 12,694 or 24.6% were born somewhere else in Switzerland, and 14,545 or 28.1% were born outside of Switzerland.

As of 2000, there were 21,499 people who were single and never married in the district. There were 23,461 married individuals, 3,154 widows or widowers and 3,571 individuals who are divorced.

There were 9,789 households that consist of only one person and 935 households with five or more people.

The historical population is given in the following chart:

== Politics ==
In the 2007 federal election the most popular party was the SP which received 28.47% of the vote. The next three most popular parties were the SVP (19.6%), the FDP (14.81%) and the LPS Party (12.31%). In the federal election, a total of 15,769 votes were cast, and the voter turnout was 50.1%.

== Religion ==
From the 2000 census, 17,266 or 33.4% were Roman Catholic, while 16,300 or 31.5% belonged to the Swiss Reformed Church. Of the rest of the population, there were 497 members of an Orthodox church (or about 0.96% of the population), there were 122 individuals (or about 0.24% of the population) who belonged to the Christian Catholic Church, and there were 2,755 individuals (or about 5.33% of the population) who belonged to another Christian church. There were 68 individuals (or about 0.13% of the population) who were Jewish, and 2,090 (or about 4.04% of the population) who were Islamic. There were 145 individuals who were Buddhist, 120 individuals who were Hindu and 73 individuals who belonged to another church. 11,074 (or about 21.43% of the population) belonged to no church, are agnostic or atheist, and 2,508 individuals (or about 4.85% of the population) did not answer the question.

== Weather ==
Neuchâtel city has an average of 121.8 days of rain or snow per year and on average receives 932 mm (36.7 in) of precipitation. The wettest month is August during which time Neuchâtel city receives an average of 97 mm (3.8 in) of rain or snow. During this month there is precipitation for an average of 10.1 days. The month with the most days of precipitation is May, with an average of 12.4, but with only 82 mm (3.2 in) of rain or snow. The driest month of the year is April with an average of 63 mm (2.5 in) of precipitation over 10.2 days.

== Education ==
In Neuchâtel about 18,099 or (35.0%) of the population have completed non-mandatory upper secondary education, and 8,739 or (16.9%) have completed additional higher education (either university or a Fachhochschule). Of the 8,739 who completed tertiary schooling, 47.2% were Swiss men, 27.3% were Swiss women, 15.4% were non-Swiss men and 10.2% were non-Swiss women.

In the canton of Neuchâtel most municipalities provide two years of non-mandatory kindergarten, followed by five years of mandatory primary education. The next four years of mandatory secondary education is provided at thirteen larger secondary schools, which many students travel out of their home municipality to attend. During the 2010-11 school year, there were 48 kindergarten classes with a total of 942 students in District de Neuchâtel. In the same year, there were 138 primary classes with a total of 2,561 students.
