= Regulating Lines =

Architectural concept associated with Le Corbusier

Regulating Lines is a design concept in architecture, which uses proportions of geometry in buildings giving its harmony and order. A prominent architect who espoused this concept was Le Corbusier.

== History ==
Regulating Lines have been used in early buildings like Notre-Dame de Paris and Michelangelo's Piazza del Campidoglio in Rome, etc.

== Le Corbusier ==
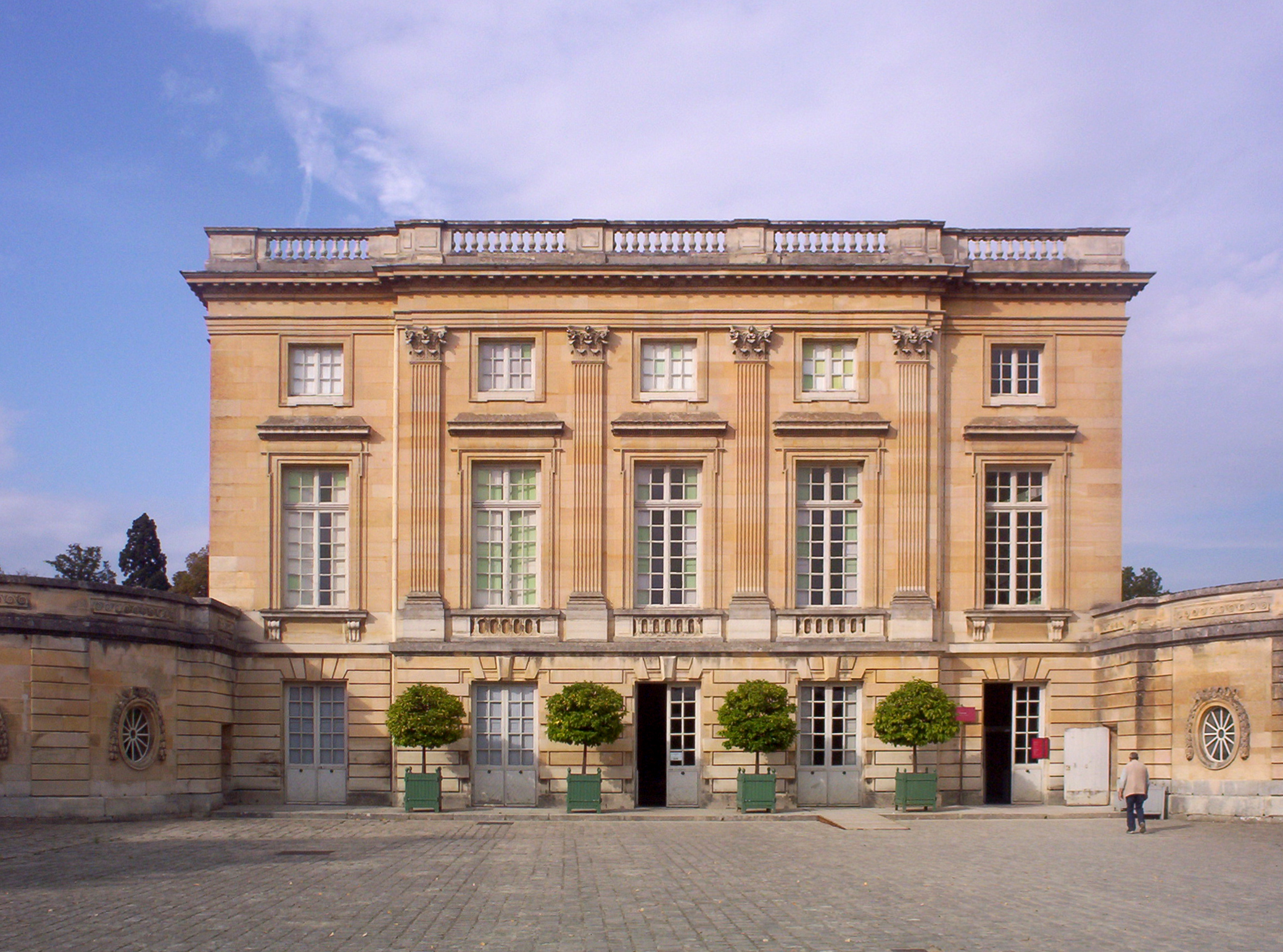
Front of the Petit Trianon

Le Corbusier argues from historical evidence that great architecture of the past has been guided by the use of what came to be known in English as Regulating Lines. These lines, starting at significant areas of the main volumes, could be used to rationalize the placement of features in buildings. Le Corbusier lists off several structures he claims used this, including a speculative ancient temple form, Notre-Dame de Paris, the Piazza del Campidoglio in Rome, the Petit Trianon, and lastly, his pre-war neoclassical work in Paris and some more contemporary modern buildings. In each case, he attempts to show how the lines augment the fine proportions and add a rational sense of coherence to the buildings. In this way, the order, the function, and the volume of the space are drawn into one architectural moment. Le Corbusier argues that this method aids in formalizing the intuitive sense of aesthetics and integrating human proportions as well.

Le Corbusier claims in the text that no architects trained in the Beaux-arts technique use regulating lines, because of contradictory training, but most of the Grand Prix architects did use them, even if they were supplementing the basic techniques. Le Corbusier used the concept in his early work Villa Schwob in 1916.
