= Mohel book =

The Jewish circumcision ceremony, brit mila, is enacted by a trained specialist called a mohel. Typically, mohels record the circumcisions they have performed in small mohel books, which have become especially important in the field of genealogical research.

== Use and format ==
The first pages of a mohel book are typically dedicated to the special prayers recited during brit mila.

The remaining pages are used to record the details of circumcisions, usually the place, date and name of the boy who was circumcised.

Mohels often chose smaller books for this purpose, so they could easily be carried around. Often, they decorated the books and title pages to look like medieval manuscripts. From the 18th century, blank mohel books were printed especially for circumcision entries. Today, the entries are usually digital, and efforts are being made to digitalise existing mohel books as well.

== Importance for genealogical and geographical research ==
While Christian births were documented in baptismal registries, Jewish births were not recorded systematically. In central Europe, birth registers were only introduced after 1876 (excepting France). Prior to this, Jewish cemeteries and mohel books were the most reliable records of Jewish family names and place. However, these books often remained in private hands, making them hard to access for scholars and families doing genealogical research.

Mohel books in combination with cemeteries and place names can give an overview of the movement of Jews in Europe in the Middle Ages and later centuries.

== Known historical examples ==
- Mohel book of Henri Levaillant-Guggenheim from Hegenheim (Alsace, France) with entries from 1868 to 1914, Switzerland and Alsace.
- Mohel book of Lazarus Lieber Dreyfus from Endingen (Aargau, Switzerland) with entries from 1827 to 1863.
- Mohel book of Meir Bar Jehuda, called Leib Ditesheim from Hegenheim (Alsace, France) with entries from 1805 to 1849, Switzerland and Alsace.
- Mohel book of Moses Salomon Dreyfus from Endingen (Aargau, Switzerland) with entries from 1823 to 1871.
- Mohel book of Baruch Bloch from Randegg (Austria) with entries from 1866 to 1871.
- Mohel book with entries from 1751 to 1847, Upper Rhine.
- Mohel book of Jacob Ulmo from Pfersee near Augsburg (Germany) with entries from 1784/85 till 1792.
- Mohel book of the ancestors of Susi Guggenheim-Weil from Gailingen, 18th century.

== Gallery ==
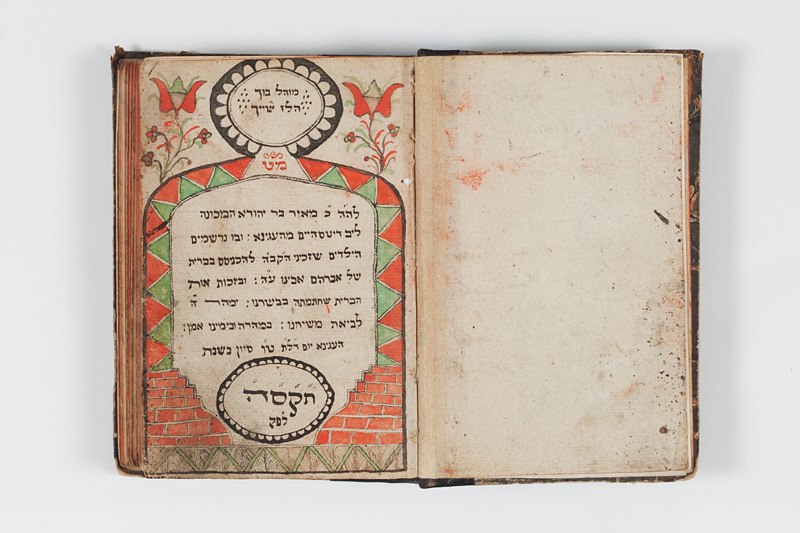
Mohel book of Meir Bar Jehuda (Leib Ditesheim) from Hegenheim, dated between 1805 and 1849. Today in the Jewish Museum of Switzerland's collection.

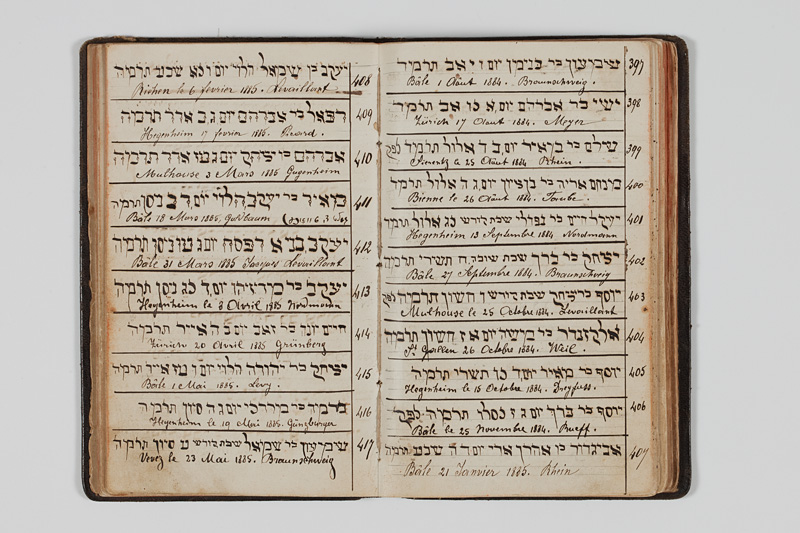
Mohel book of Henri Levaillant-Guggenheim from Hegenheim (Alsace, France) with entries from 1868 to 1914, Switzerland and Alsace.

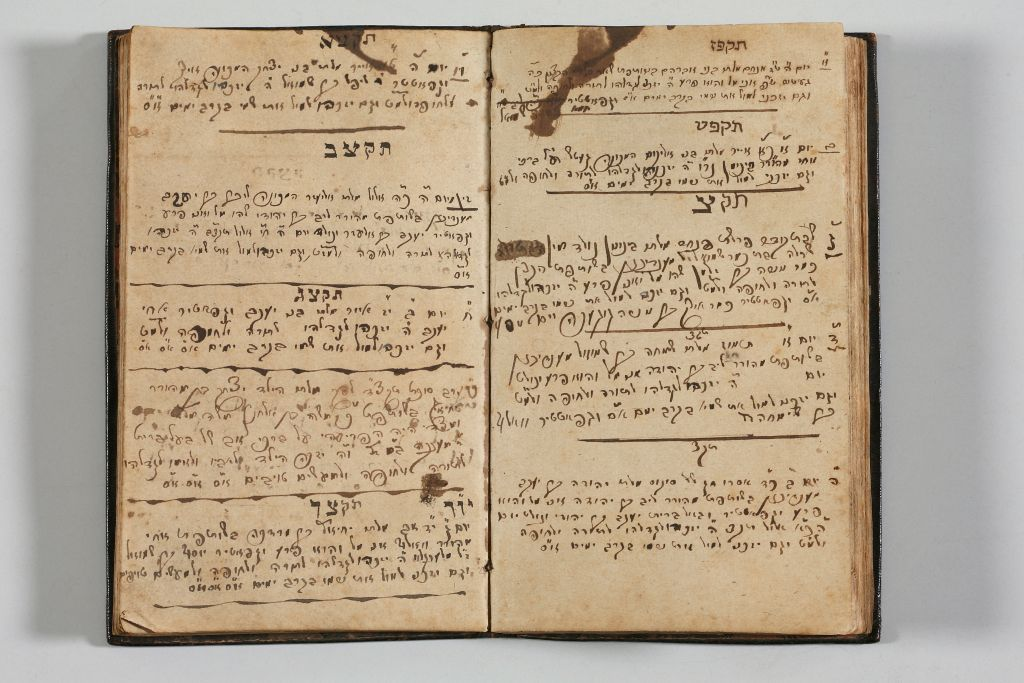
Mohel book of Lazarus Lieber Dreyfus from Endingen (Aargau, Switzerland) with entries from 1827 to 1863.

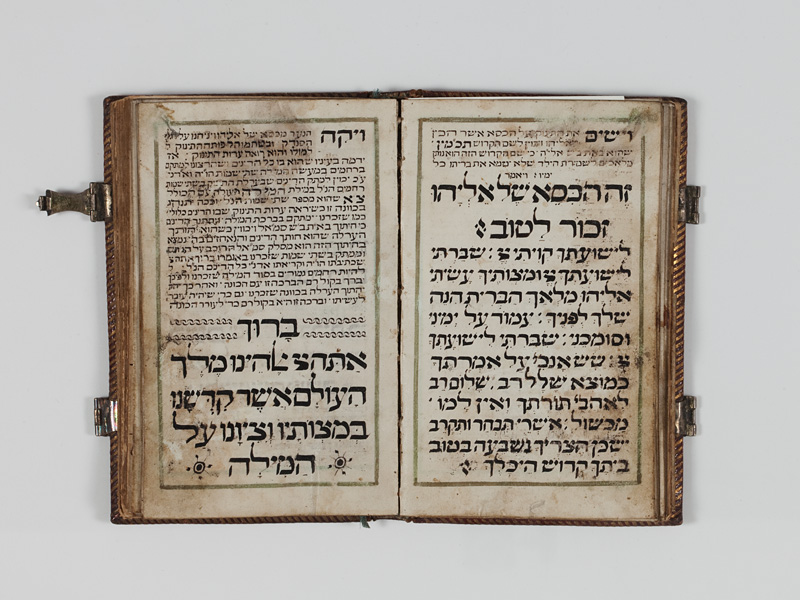
Mohel book with entries from 1751 to 1847, Upper Rhine.
