= Mohel =

Jew trained in the practice of brit milah

A mohel (pronounced [moˈhel]; Hebrew: מוֹהֵל; Ashkenazi Hebrew pronunciation [ˈmɔɪ.əl]; pl. מוֹהֲלִים, mōhălîm [mo.haˈlim]; Imperial Aramaic: מוֹהֲלָא, romanized: mōhălāʾ, lit. 'circumciser') is a Jewish man trained in the practice of brit milah (lit. 'covenant [of] circumcision'). A woman who is trained in the practice is referred to as a mohelet (מוֹהֶלֶת; pl. מוֹהֲלוֹת, mōhălôt). Ashkenazi Jews may use the word "moyel" based on the Yiddish pronunciation of the Hebrew "mohel".

== Etymology ==
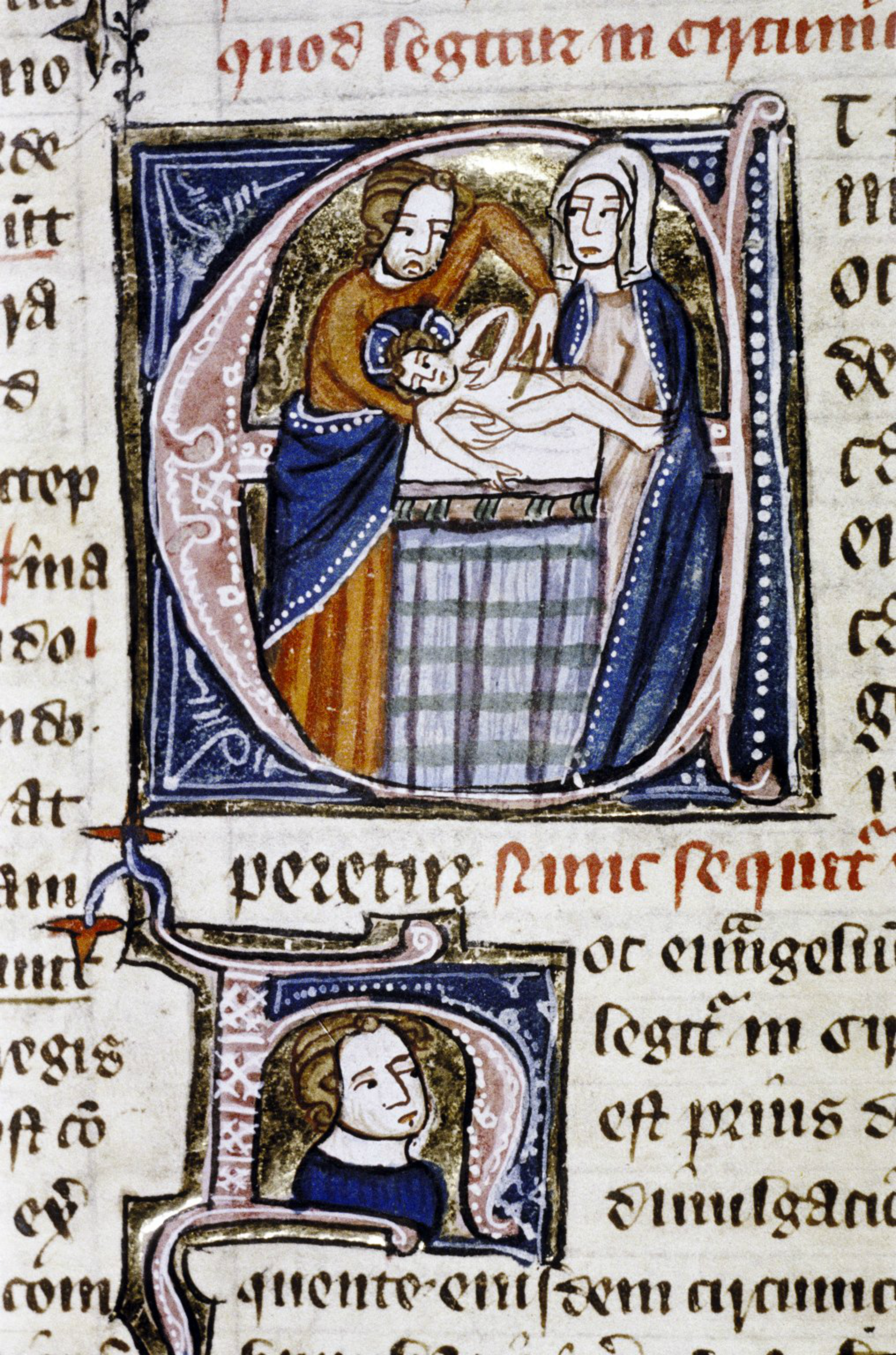
A historiated initial E featuring a mohel performing the circumcision of Jesus, accompanied by Mary (c. 1350)

The noun mohel ('mohala' in Aramaic), meaning "circumciser", is derived from the same verb stem as milah (circumcision). The noun appeared for the first time in the 4th century as the title of a circumciser (Shabbat (Talmud) 156a).

== Origins of circumcision in Judaism ==
For Jews, male circumcision is mandatory, as it is prescribed in the Torah. In the Book of Genesis, it is described as a mark of the covenant of the pieces between Yahweh and the descendants of Abraham:

And God said unto Abraham: 'And as for thee, thou shalt keep My covenant, thou, and thy seed after thee throughout their generations. This is My covenant, which ye shall keep, between Me and you and thy seed after thee: every male among you shall be circumcised. And ye shall be circumcised in the flesh of your foreskin; and it shall be a token of a covenant betwixt Me and you. And he that is eight days old shall be circumcised among you, every male throughout your generations, he that is born in the house, or bought with money of any foreigner, that is not of thy seed. He that is born in thy house, and he that is bought with thy money, must needs be circumcised; and My covenant shall be in your flesh for an everlasting covenant. And the uncircumcised male who is not circumcised in the flesh of his foreskin, that soul shall be cut off from his people; he hath broken My covenant.'

In Leviticus:

And the LORD spoke unto Moses, saying: Speak unto the children of Israel, saying: If a woman be delivered, and bear a man-child, then she shall be unclean seven days; as in the days of the impurity of her sickness shall she be unclean. And in the eighth day the flesh of his foreskin shall be circumcised. And she shall continue in the blood of purification three and thirty days; she shall touch no hallowed thing, nor come into the sanctuary, until the days of her purification be fulfilled.

== Functions ==
Biblically, the infant's father (avi haben) is commanded to perform the circumcision himself. However, as most fathers are not comfortable or do not have the training, they designate a mohel or mohelet. Mohalim are specially trained in circumcision and the rituals surrounding the procedure. Many mohalim are doctors or rabbis (some are both) or cantors, and today are required to receive appropriate training, both religious and medical.

Traditionally, mohalim use a scalpel to circumcise the newborn. Today, doctors and some non-Orthodox mohalim use a perforating clamp before they cut the skin. The clamp makes it easier to be precise and shortens recovery time. Orthodox mohalim have rejected perforating clamps, arguing that by crushing and killing the skin it causes a great amount of unnecessary pain to the newborn, cutting off the blood flow completely, which according to Jewish law is dangerous to the child and strictly forbidden, and also renders the orlah (foreskin) as cut prior to the proper ritual cut.

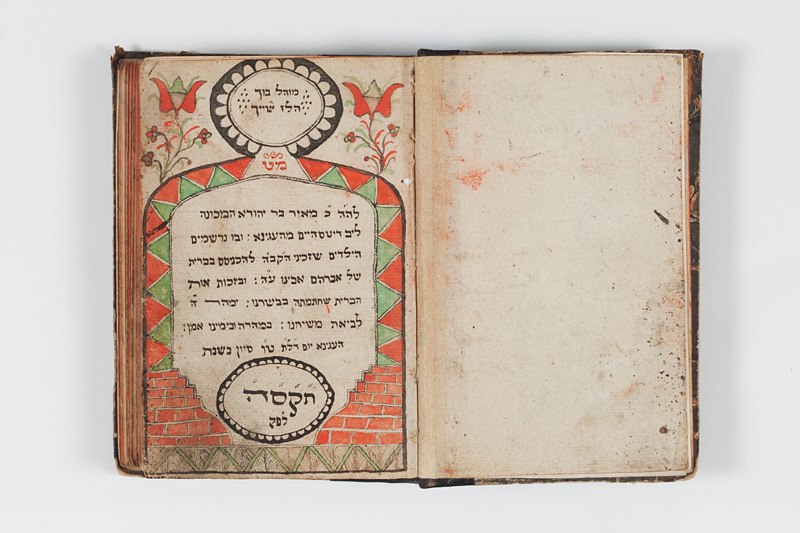
Mohel book from Hegenheim (F), dated between 1805 and 1849. Today in the Jewish Museum of Switzerland's collection.

Under Jewish law, mohalim must draw blood from the circumcision wound. Most mohalim do it by hand with a suction device, but some follow the traditional practice of doing it by mouth. The Centers for Disease Control and Prevention issued a warning in 2012 about the health implications of the latter practice, citing eleven cases of neonatal herpes simplex virus (HSV) and two recorded fatalities. A 2013 review of cases of neonatal HSV infections in Israel identified ritual circumcision as the source of HSV-1 transmission in 31.8% of the cases.

Many mohalim continue the practice of listing the names and birthdates of the boys they circumcise in little booklets. These books have become important documents for genealogical scholarship. Increasingly, these notes on circumcision are being digitized.

== Women ==
According to traditional Jewish law, if no Jewish male expert is available, a Jewish woman who has the required skills is also authorized to perform the circumcision. Non-Orthodox Judaism allows women to be mohalot (מוֹהֲלוֹת, plural of מוֹהֶלֶת, 'mohelet', feminine of mohel), without restriction.

In 1984, Dr. Deborah Cohen became the first Reform Jewish mohelet to be certified (by the Berit Mila Program of Reform Judaism). Cohen was an obstetrician at Kaiser Permanente Hospital in Los Angeles. A family doctor, Cohen had first turned to the Conservative and Orthodox movements to be trained as a mohelet, but was denied. In early fall of 1981, Cohen contacted the Hebrew Union College to ask for training, but the Reform movement had not yet trained any women to be mohalot. The Reform movement recognized that women could act as mohalot in 1984. The Union of American Hebrew Congregations (now the Union for Reform Judaism), created the Brit Milah Board as the first circumcision training program offered by a liberal Jewish organization.

== In popular culture ==
- In the popular sitcom Seinfeld, a mohel played by Charles Levin appears in the episode The Bris.
- In the parody film Robin Hood: Men in Tights, Rabbi Tuckman (a parody of Friar Tuck, played by Mel Brooks) serves as Nottingham's "mohel extraordinaire" using a miniature guillotine.
- "Weird Al" Yankovic's song Pretty Fly for a Rabbi, a parody of Pretty Fly (For a White Guy), contains the line "The parents pay the mohel and he gets to keep the tip!"
- In the Rugrats Hanukkah episode, the characters walk through the town center of ancient Israel past a shop titled mohel advertising a "cut rate"
- Philip Sherman, one of the most prolific mohalim in the United States, was called America's Top Mohel" and "the busiest mohel in New York" in national and regional media
