= Château de Hegenheim =

Castle in Haut-Rhin, Alsace, France

Coordinates: 47.5624°N 7.5287°E

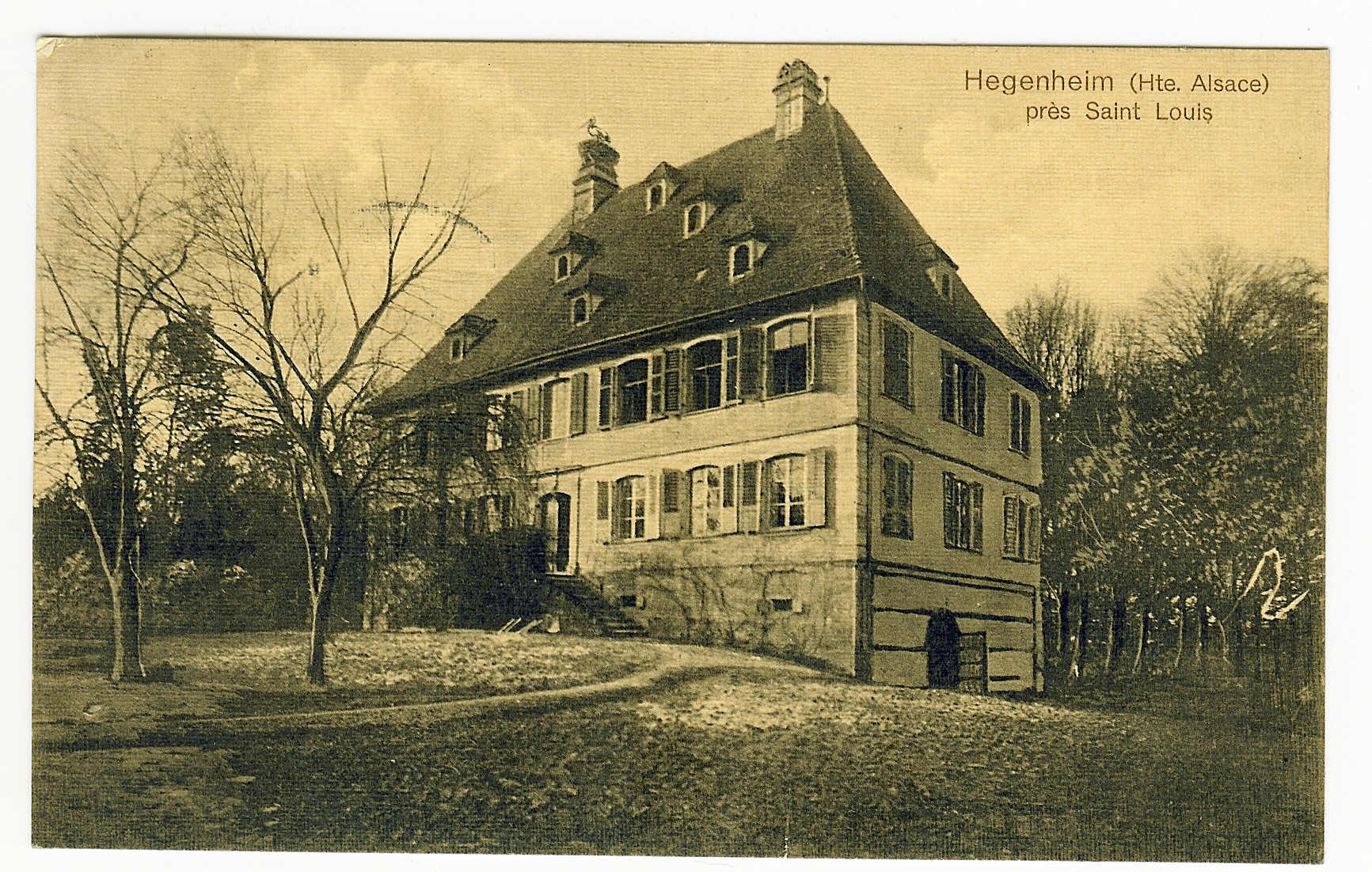
The Hegenheim Castle

The Château de Hegenheim is a castle in the commune of Hégenheim, in the department of Haut-Rhin, Alsace, France. It has been a listed historical monument since 1990.
