= Thielle-Wavre =

- Former municipality
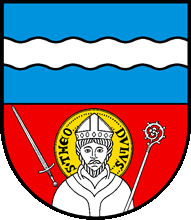
- Coat of arms
- Location of Thielle-Wavre
- Location within Switzerland Location within Canton of Neuchâtel
- Coordinates: 47°1′N 7°2′E
- Country: Switzerland
- Canton: Neuchâtel
- District: Neuchâtel

Area
  - Total: 2.09 km^{2} (0.81 sq mi)
- Elevation: 438 m (1,437 ft)

Population (December 2007)
  - Total: 680
  - Density: 330/km^{2} (840/sq mi)
- Time zone: UTC+01:00 (CET)
  - Summer (DST): UTC+02:00 (CEST)
- Postal code: 2075
- SFOS number: 6460
- ISO 3166 code: CH-NE
- Surrounded by: Cornaux, Gals (BE), Gampelen (BE), Marin-Epagnier, Saint-Blaise
- Website: thielle-wavre.ne.ch

Thielle-Wavre is a former municipality in the district of Neuchâtel in the Swiss canton of Neuchâtel. On 1 January 2009, Marin-Epagnier and Thielle-Wavre merged to form the new municipality of La Tène.

The hamlet of Montmirail lies within the territory of Thielle-Wavre.
