= Marin-Epagnier =

- Former municipality
- Coat of arms
- Location of Marin-Epagnier
- Location within Switzerland Location within Canton of Neuchâtel
- Coordinates: 47°01′N 7°01′E
- Country: Switzerland
- Canton: Neuchâtel
- District: Neuchâtel

Area
  - Total: 3.26 km^{2} (1.26 sq mi)
- Elevation: 450 m (1,480 ft)

Population (December 2007)
  - Total: 4,087
  - Density: 1,250/km^{2} (3,250/sq mi)
- Time zone: UTC+01:00 (CET)
  - Summer (DST): UTC+02:00 (CEST)
- Postal code: 2074
- SFOS number: 6457
- ISO 3166 code: CH-NE
- Surrounded by: Cudrefin (VD), Gampelen (BE), Ins (BE), Saint-Blaise, Thielle-Wavre
- Website: marin-epagnier.ne.ch

Marin-Epagnier was a municipality in the district of Neuchâtel in the Swiss canton of Neuchâtel. On 1 January 2009, Marin-Epagnier and Thielle-Wavre merged to form the new municipality of La Tène.

It is located at the northeastern tip of Lake Neuchâtel at an elevation of 455 meters, and, as of 2004, a population of 3,925 people. It lies close to Biel, at the boundary between French- and German-speaking regions, and at a knot of highways. Marin Epagnier has attracted numerous administrative offices and workshops of the micromechanics, electronics, and watchmaking industries, such as Métaux Précieux SA Métalor and TAG Heuer watches.

The blazon of Marin-Epagnier's coat-of-arms is: "Sable, a Lion rampant or langued and armed Gules".

The Iron Age archaeological site of La Tène is within Marin-Epagnier's communal boundaries; see La Tène culture for an account of the history of the site. La Tène was the name of the lakeside area south of Epagnier, at the eastern end of the Lake Neuchâtel. La Tène has a sandy beach, unique in Switzerland.
