= Jeanjaquet Castle =

Castle in the municipality of Cressier of the Canton of Neuchâtel in Switzerland

Coordinates: 47°02′55″N 7°01′34″E

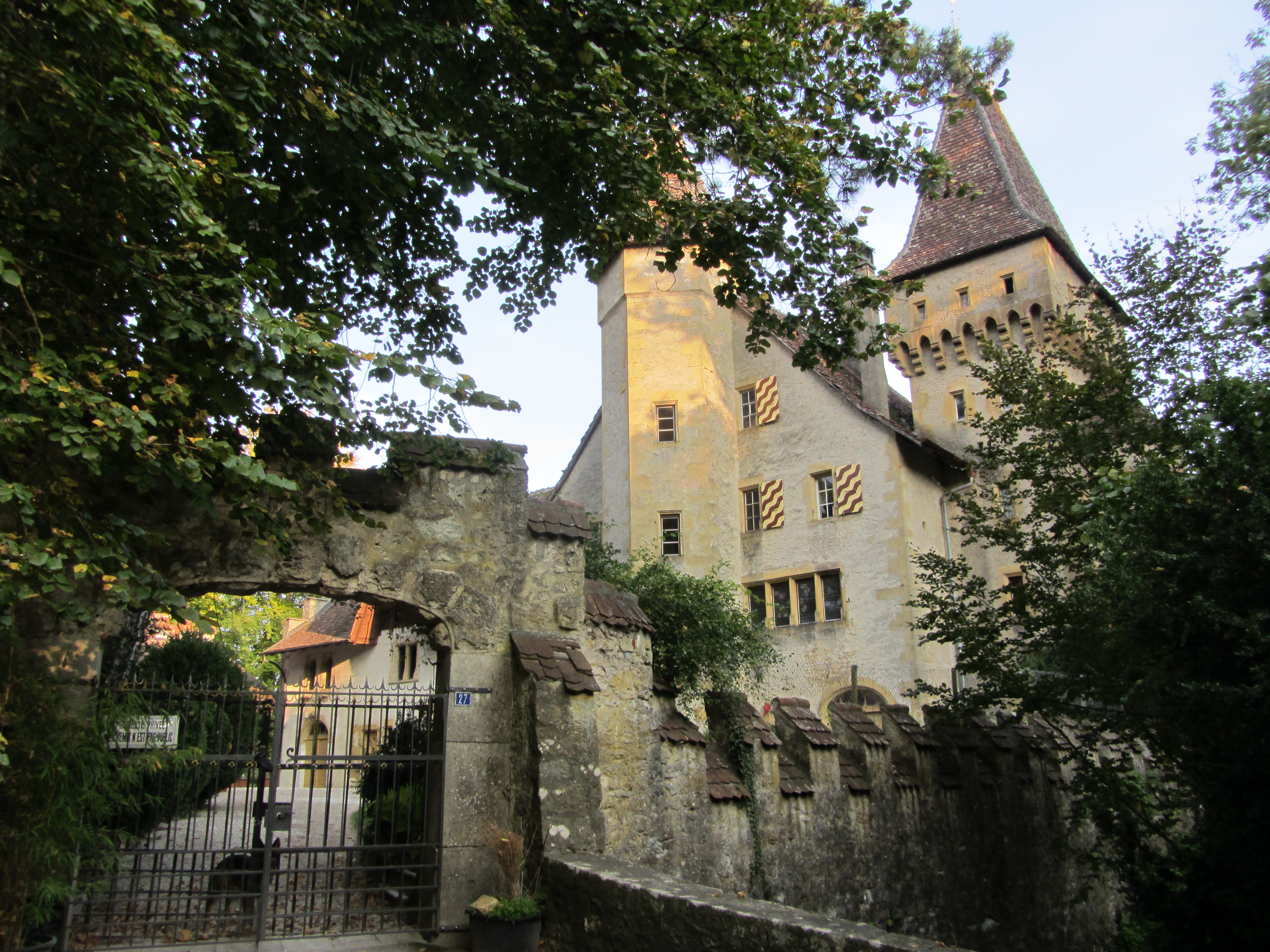
Jeanjaquet Castle

Jeanjaquet Castle is a castle in the municipality of Cressier of the Canton of Neuchâtel in Switzerland. It is a Swiss heritage site of national significance.

== See also ==
- List of castles in Switzerland
- Château
