= Souaillon Castle =

Castle in Cornaux, Switzerland

Coordinates: 47°01′28″N 7°00′20″E

Souaillon Castle is a castle in the municipality of Cornaux of the Canton of Neuchâtel in Switzerland. It is a Swiss heritage site of national significance.

== See also ==
- List of castles in Switzerland
- Château
