= Philip Sherman (cantor) =

American rabbi (1956–2023)

Personal life
- Born: Philip Lloyd Sherman; April 26, 1956 Syracuse, New York, U.S.
- Died: August 9, 2023 (aged 67) Englewood, New Jersey, U.S.
- Spouse: Dr. Naomi Freistat (m. 1980; div. 1993) Andrea Raab (m. 1994; div. 2022)
- Children: 3
- Education: Columbia University; Jewish Theological Seminary of America
- Occupation: Cantor; mohel; actor

Religious life
- Religion: Judaism
- Denomination: Orthodox Judaism
- Synagogue: Congregation Shearith Israel

Philip Lloyd Sherman (April 26, 1956 – August 9, 2023) was an American Orthodox Jewish cantor, mohel, and actor. Over a 45-year career, Sherman performed more than 26,000 brit milot (Jewish ritual circumcisions), for which he was called "America's Top Mohel" and "the busiest mohel in New York." As an actor, he made appearances in television shows such as The Marvelous Mrs. Maisel and Orange Is the New Black.

== Early life ==
Philip Lloyd Sherman was born on April 26, 1956, to a secular Jewish family in Syracuse, New York. His maternal grandfather Isadore Jacobs had been a rabbi, dayan, shochet, and mohel. His mother was an English teacher, and his father was a factory worker. He earned degrees in 1979 from a joint program at Columbia University and the Jewish Theological Seminary of America in music and Jewish studies.

== Religious career ==
While attending university, Sherman received certification as a mohel from Rabbi Yosef Hakohen Halperin, the former chief mohel of Jerusalem. Sherman performed his first brit milah (Jewish ritual circumcision) at the age of 21 in Brooklyn in February 1978. In 1997, he created a website for his mohel business, emoil.com, that earned a mention in the New York Post.

Over a 45-year career, Sherman conducted tens of thousands of circumcisions for Jews, Christians, and Muslims, and performed circumcisions in the United States, Hong Kong, Singapore, Japan, Bermuda, and in a bar on Third Avenue in New York City. Among the newborns he circumcised were two grandsons of Israeli prime ministers, the grandson of the chief mohel of Jerusalem, and the sons of actress Rachel Weisz and of New York City politician Scott Stringer. In 2012, he performed his first second-generation circumcision.

In 2009, New York Magazine dubbed Sherman the "busiest mohel in New York." The Jewish Telegraphic Agency named Sherman one of "America's Top Mohels". In 2012, he estimated that he had conducted 20,000 circumcisions, including nine in one day. By 2014, the estimate had risen to more than 26,000, including 11 in one day (included two sets of twins).

Sherman was a cantor at synagogues in Manhattan, including service as a cantor at Congregation Shearith Israel on the Upper West Side of New York City from 1985 to 2019.

== Acting career ==
Sherman also worked as an actor, and quipped on his website that he was "the only Modern Orthodox Jewish motorcycle-riding Mohel in SAG/AFTRA". His acting career began in 1987, when his voice was featured in a national commercial for Philip Morris. He starred alongside Whoopi Goldberg in a 1999 commercial for Flooz.com, a digital currency. He was also featured as an expert on Storage Wars. He was cast to play a mohel in the 2011 film Our Idiot Brother, but his role was cut. He also played a character known as "Aliyah Man" for an episode of The Marvelous Mrs. Maisel and played a judge in Orange Is the New Black. Sherman wore the robe he wore as a synagogue cantor at his audition to the latter.

== Views ==
Sherman disliked doctors performing ritual circumcisions, as he believed it blurred the lines between a medical procedure and a religious ceremony.

== Personal life and death ==
Sherman and his wife, Dr. Naomi Freistat, married in 1980, had a daughter and two sons, for whom he performed the circumcision. The marriage ended in divorce in 1993. Sherman remarried in 1994 to author Andrea Raab. The family lived on the Upper West Side. Sherman and his wife divorced in 2022 after 28 years of marriage.

Philip Sherman died from pancreatic cancer at his home in Englewood, New Jersey, on August 9, 2023, at the age of 67.
