= Cornaux =

- Municipality
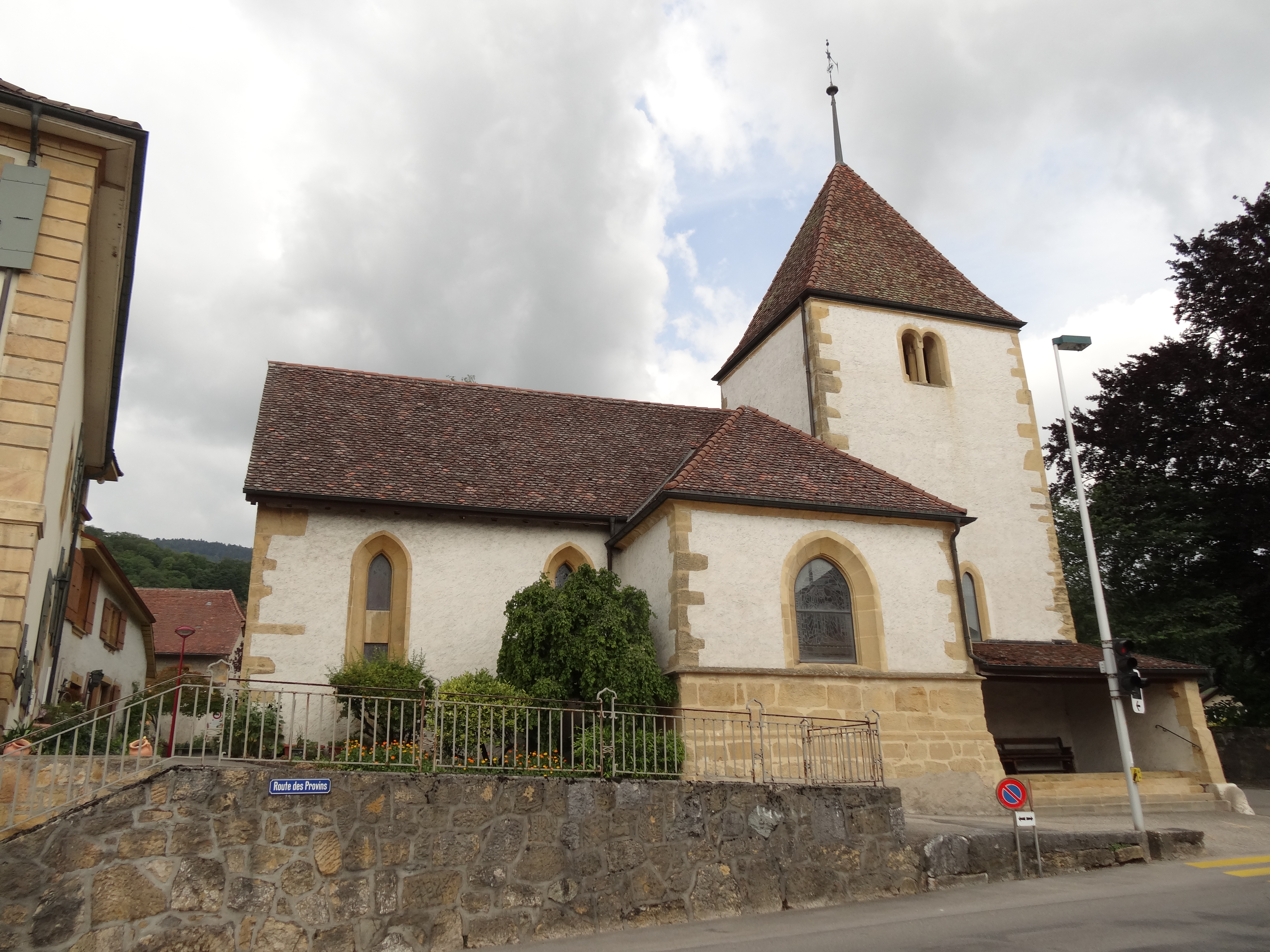
- Village church in Cornaux

- Flag Coat of arms
- Location of Cornaux
- Location within Switzerland Location within Canton of Neuchâtel
- Coordinates: 47°2′N 7°1′E
- Country: Switzerland
- Canton: Neuchâtel

Area
  - Total: 4.72 km^{2} (1.82 sq mi)
- Elevation: 440 m (1,440 ft)

Population (December 2007)
  - Total: 1,497
  - Density: 317/km^{2} (821/sq mi)
- Time zone: UTC+01:00 (CET)
  - Summer (DST): UTC+02:00 (CEST)
- Postal code: 2087
- SFOS number: 6451
- ISO 3166 code: CH-NE
- Surrounded by: Cressier, Gals (BE), Laténa, Thielle-Wavre
- Website: www.cornaux.ch

Cornaux is a municipality in the Swiss canton of Neuchâtel.

== History ==
Cornaux in 1954

Cornaux is first mentioned in 1212 as Curnaul.

== Geography ==
Cornaux has an area, as of 2009, of 4.7 square kilometers (1.8 mi^{2}). Of this area, 2.16 km^{2} (0.83 mi^{2}) or 45.8% is used for agricultural purposes, while 1.05 km^{2} (0.41 mi^{2}) or 22.2% is forested. Of the rest of the land, 1.47 km^{2} (0.57 mi^{2}) or 31.1% is settled (buildings or roads), 0.03 km^{2} (7.4 acres) or 0.6% is either rivers or lakes and 0.01 km^{2} (2.5 acres) or 0.2% is unproductive land.

Of the built up area, industrial buildings made up 9.7% of the total area while housing and buildings made up 4.4% and transportation infrastructure made up 8.7%. Power and water infrastructure as well as other special developed areas made up 7.2% of the area while parks, green belts and sports fields made up 1.1%. Out of the forested land, 20.3% of the total land area is heavily forested and 1.9% is covered with orchards or small clusters of trees. Of the agricultural land, 35.2% is used for growing crops and 5.7% is pastures, while 4.9% is used for orchards or vine crops. All the water in the municipality is flowing water.

The municipality is located at the foot of the Jura Mountains.

It was part of the Neuchâtel district until the district level was eliminated on 1 January 2018.

== Coat of arms ==
The blazon of the municipal coat of arms is Azure, a Sun in splendour Or, in chief two Trefoils Argent.

== Demographics ==
Cornaux has a population (as of December 2020) of 1,587. As of 2008, 19.4% of the population are resident foreign nationals. Over the last 10 years (2000–2010) the population has changed at a rate of 3.6%. It has changed at a rate of 0.1% due to migration and at a rate of 3.8% due to births and deaths.

Most of the population (as of 2000) speaks French (1,286 or 87.3%) as their first language, German is the second most common (76 or 5.2%) and Italian is the third (31 or 2.1%). There are 2 people who speak Romansh.

As of 2008, the population was 50.1% male and 49.9% female. The population was made up of 589 Swiss men (38.6% of the population) and 175 (11.5%) non-Swiss men. There were 636 Swiss women (41.7%) and 126 (8.3%) non-Swiss women. Of the population in the municipality, 357 or about 24.2% were born in Cornaux and lived there in 2000. There were 416 or 28.2% who were born in the same canton, while 377 or 25.6% were born somewhere else in Switzerland, and 281 or 19.1% were born outside of Switzerland.

As of 2000, children and teenagers (0–19 years old) make up 25.6% of the population, while adults (20–64 years old) make up 63.2% and seniors (over 64 years old) make up 11.2%.

As of 2000, there were 590 people who were single and never married in the municipality. There were 739 married individuals, 71 widows or widowers and 73 individuals who are divorced.

As of 2000, there were 603 private households in the municipality, and an average of 2.4 persons per household. There were 179 households that consist of only one person and 34 households with five or more people. In 2000, a total of 594 apartments (94.4% of the total) were permanently occupied, while 23 apartments (3.7%) were seasonally occupied and 12 apartments (1.9%) were empty. As of 2009, the construction rate of new housing units was 12.6 new units per 1000 residents. The vacancy rate for the municipality, in 2010, was 0.43%.

The historical population is given in the following chart:

== Heritage sites of national significance ==
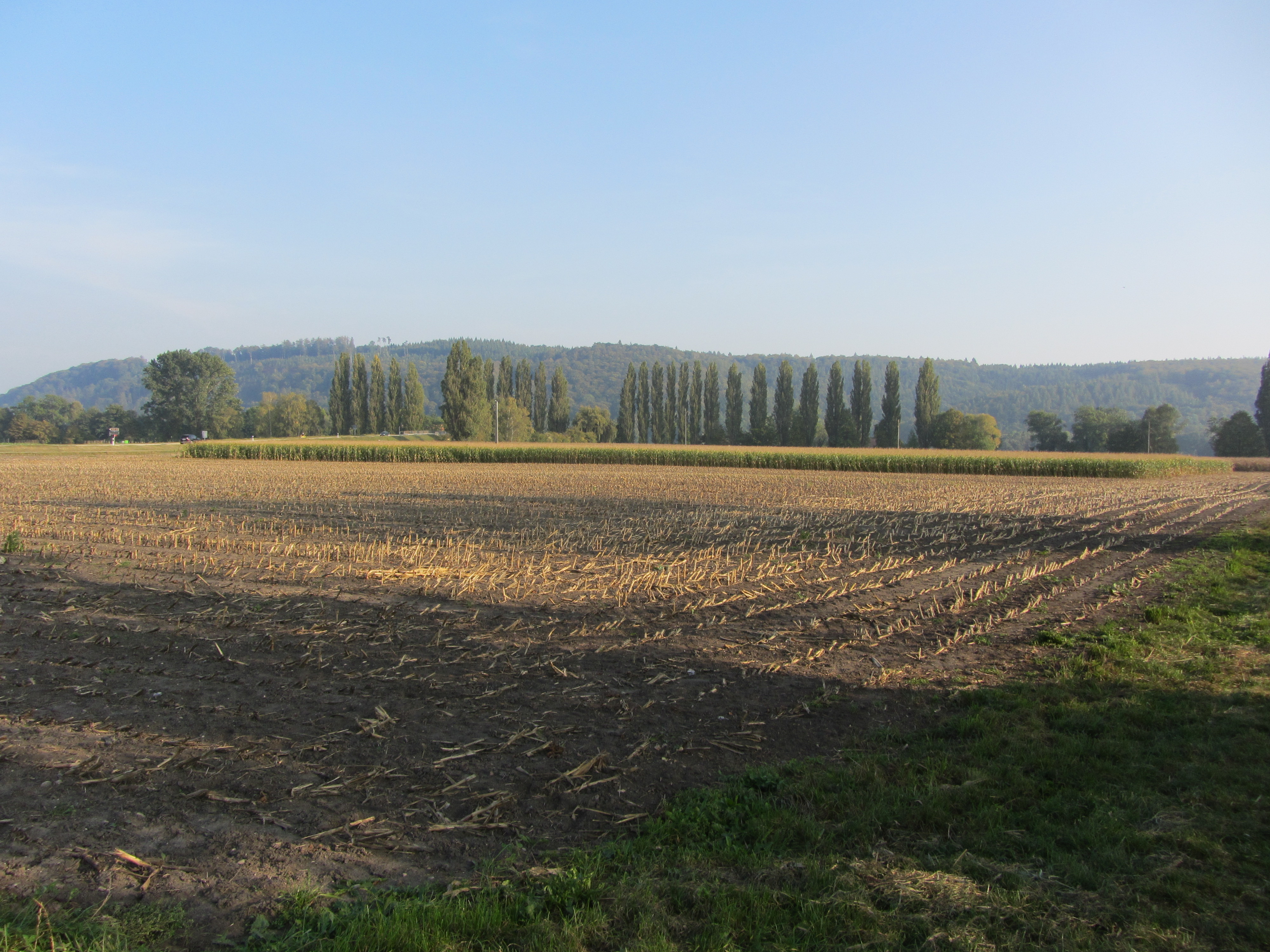
La Vieille Thielle, archeological site

The Neolithic and Roman era sites at the Ensemble De La Vieille and the gardens of Souaillon Castle are listed as Swiss heritage site of national significance.

== Politics ==
In the 2007 federal election the most popular party was the SVP which received 25.45% of the vote. The next three most popular parties were the SP (25.12%), the FDP (24.1%) and the LPS Party (9.54%). In the federal election, a total of 497 votes were cast, and the voter turnout was 50.7%.

== Economy ==
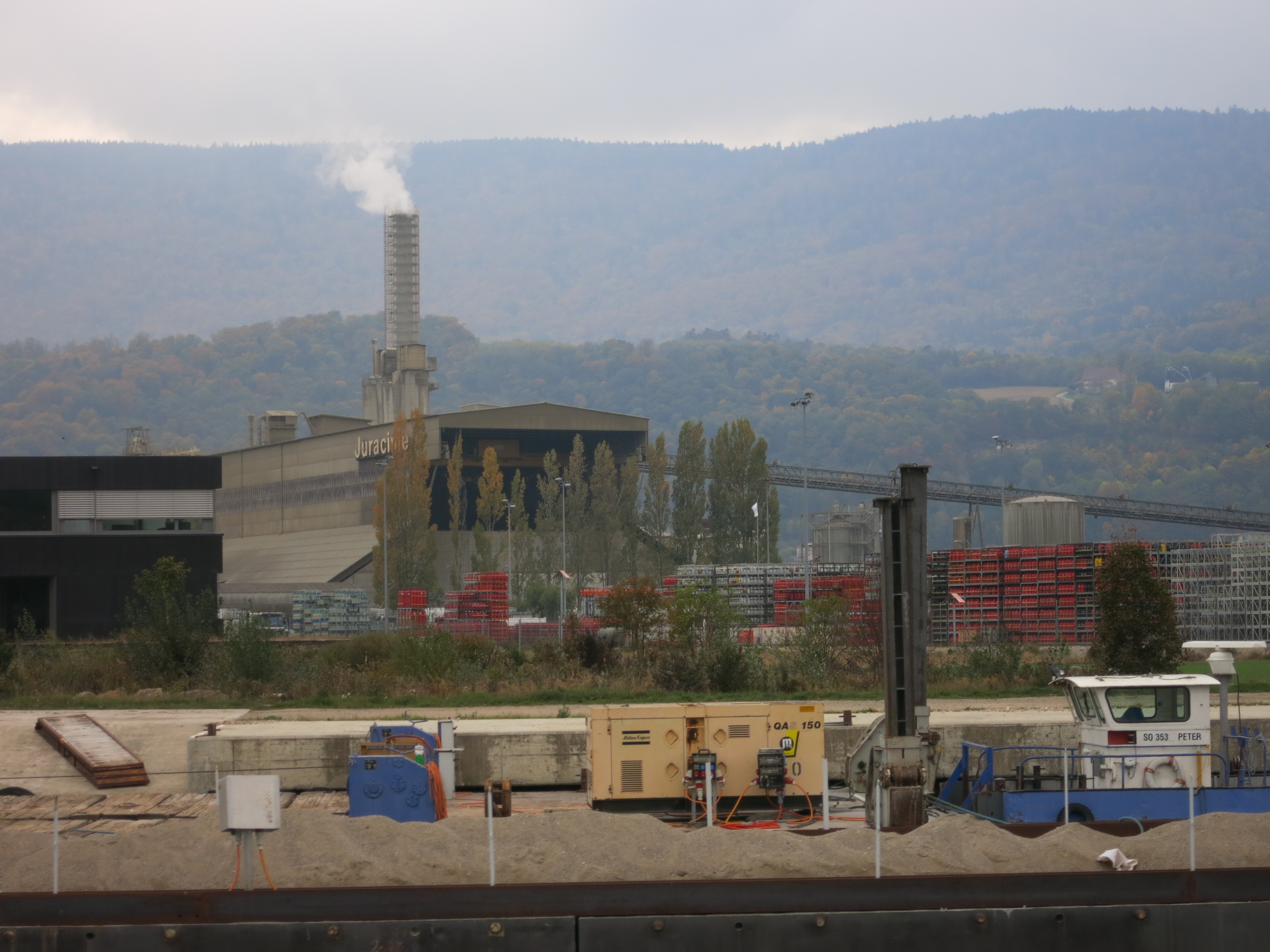
The Zihl canal near Cornaux

Its main industrial employers are a refinery, vineyards and a cement factory.

As of 2010, Cornaux had an unemployment rate of 5.4%. As of 2008, there were 20 people employed in the primary economic sector and about 7 businesses involved in this sector. 212 people were employed in the secondary sector and there were 22 businesses in this sector. 230 people were employed in the tertiary sector, with 50 businesses in this sector. There were 802 residents of the municipality who were employed in some capacity, of which females made up 43.8% of the workforce.

In 2008 the total number of full-time equivalent jobs was 413. The number of jobs in the primary sector was 14, all of which were in agriculture. The number of jobs in the secondary sector was 201 of which 179 or (89.1%) were in manufacturing and 12 (6.0%) were in construction. The number of jobs in the tertiary sector was 198. In the tertiary sector; 98 or 49.5% were in wholesale or retail sales or the repair of motor vehicles, 7 or 3.5% were in the movement and storage of goods, 11 or 5.6% were in a hotel or restaurant, 5 or 2.5% were in the information industry, 22 or 11.1% were technical professionals or scientists, 6 or 3.0% were in education and 3 or 1.5% were in health care.

In 2000, there were 387 workers who commuted into the municipality and 624 workers who commuted away. The municipality is a net exporter of workers, with about 1.6 workers leaving the municipality for every one entering. About 1.6% of the workforce coming into Cornaux are coming from outside Switzerland. Of the working population, 10.7% used public transportation to get to work, and 69.5% used a private car.

== Religion ==
From the 2000 census, 471 or 32.0% were Roman Catholic, while 594 or 40.3% belonged to the Swiss Reformed Church. Of the rest of the population, there were 2 members of an Orthodox church (or about 0.14% of the population), there were 14 individuals (or about 0.95% of the population) who belonged to the Christian Catholic Church, and there were 119 individuals (or about 8.08% of the population) who belonged to another Christian church. There were 33 (or about 2.24% of the population) who were Islamic. There were 6 individuals who were Buddhist. 228 (or about 15.48% of the population) belonged to no church, are agnostic or atheist, and 63 individuals (or about 4.28% of the population) did not answer the question.

== Education ==
In Cornaux about 617 or (41.9%) of the population have completed non-mandatory upper secondary education, and 136 or (9.2%) have completed additional higher education (either university or a Fachhochschule). Of the 136 who completed tertiary schooling, 60.3% were Swiss men, 16.9% were Swiss women, 16.2% were non-Swiss men and 6.6% were non-Swiss women.

In the canton of Neuchâtel most municipalities provide two years of non-mandatory kindergarten, followed by five years of mandatory primary education. The next four years of mandatory secondary education is provided at thirteen larger secondary schools, which many students travel out of their home municipality to attend. During the 2010-11 school year, there were 1.5 kindergarten classes with a total of 30 students in Cornaux. In the same year, there were 5 primary classes with a total of 84 students.

As of 2000, there was one student in Cornaux who came from another municipality, while 149 residents attended schools outside the municipality.
