= Villa Jeanneret-Perret =

House by Le Corbusier in La Chaux-de-Fonds, Switzerland

- Maison blanche
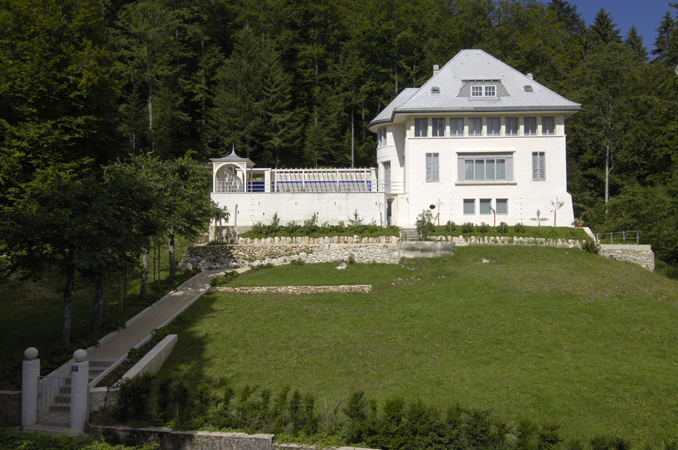
- Interactive map of the Villa Jeanneret-Perret area

General information
- Location: Switzerland, Chemin de Pouillerel 12, 2300 La Chaux-de-Fonds
- Coordinates: 47°6′22″N 6°48′57″E
- Completed: 1912
- Owner: Association Maison Blanche

Design and construction
- Architect: Le Corbusier

References
- www.maisonblache.ch

The Villa Jeanneret-Perret (also known as Maison blanche [mɛzɔ̃ blɑ̃ʃ]) is the first independent project by French-Swiss architect Le Corbusier. Built in 1912 in La Chaux-de-Fonds, Charles-Edouard Jeanneret's hometown, it was designed for his parents. Open to the public since 2005, the house is under the patronage of the Swiss National Commission for UNESCO and has been proposed by the Swiss Government for inscription on the World Heritage List.

== History ==
In February 1912, Charles-Edouard Jeanneret opened his own architectural office in La Chaux-de-Fonds, the city where he was born and where he began his career after completing his education at the advanced course of the Ecole d'Art. The architect who later took the name "Le Corbusier" was 25 years old. He had distanced himself from the spirit of Art Nouveau, travelled in Europe and in the Middle East, learned from the masters of modern architecture...The "Maison blanche" was his first independent project and a very personal creation. Jeanneret himself lived and worked in the house from 1912 to 1915. In 1919, the house was sold. It had many owners in the course of the century until 2000, when it was purchased and restored by the "Association Maison blanche" which opened it to the public in 2005.

== Design ==
The Villa Jeanneret-Perret is a witness to the pioneering architecture of the 20th century and the development of Le Corbusier; his characteristic neo-classic style breaks with the regional Art Nouveau and is based on his experience in Paris as a student of Auguste Perret and in Berlin with Peter Behrens.

== Bibliography ==
- Maison blanche. Charles-Edouard Jeanneret / Le Corbusier, Karl Spechtenhauser, Arthur Rüegg, Association Maison Blanche / Birkhäuser Verlag, 2020, ISBN 978-3-0356-2086-3 (French)
- Maison blanche. Charles-Edouard Jeanneret / Le Corbusier, Karl Spechtenhauser, Arthur Rüegg, Association Maison Blanche / Birkhäuser Verlag, 2020, ISBN 978-3-0356-2087-0 (English)
- Maison blanche. Charles-Edouard Jeanneret / Le Corbusier, Karl Spechtenhauser, Arthur Rüegg, Association Maison Blanche / Birkhäuser Verlag, 2020, ISBN 978-3-0356-2088-7 (German)
