= Villa Schwob =

House by Le Corbusier in La Chaux-de-Fonds, Switzerland

Coordinates: 47.0999°N 6.8170°E

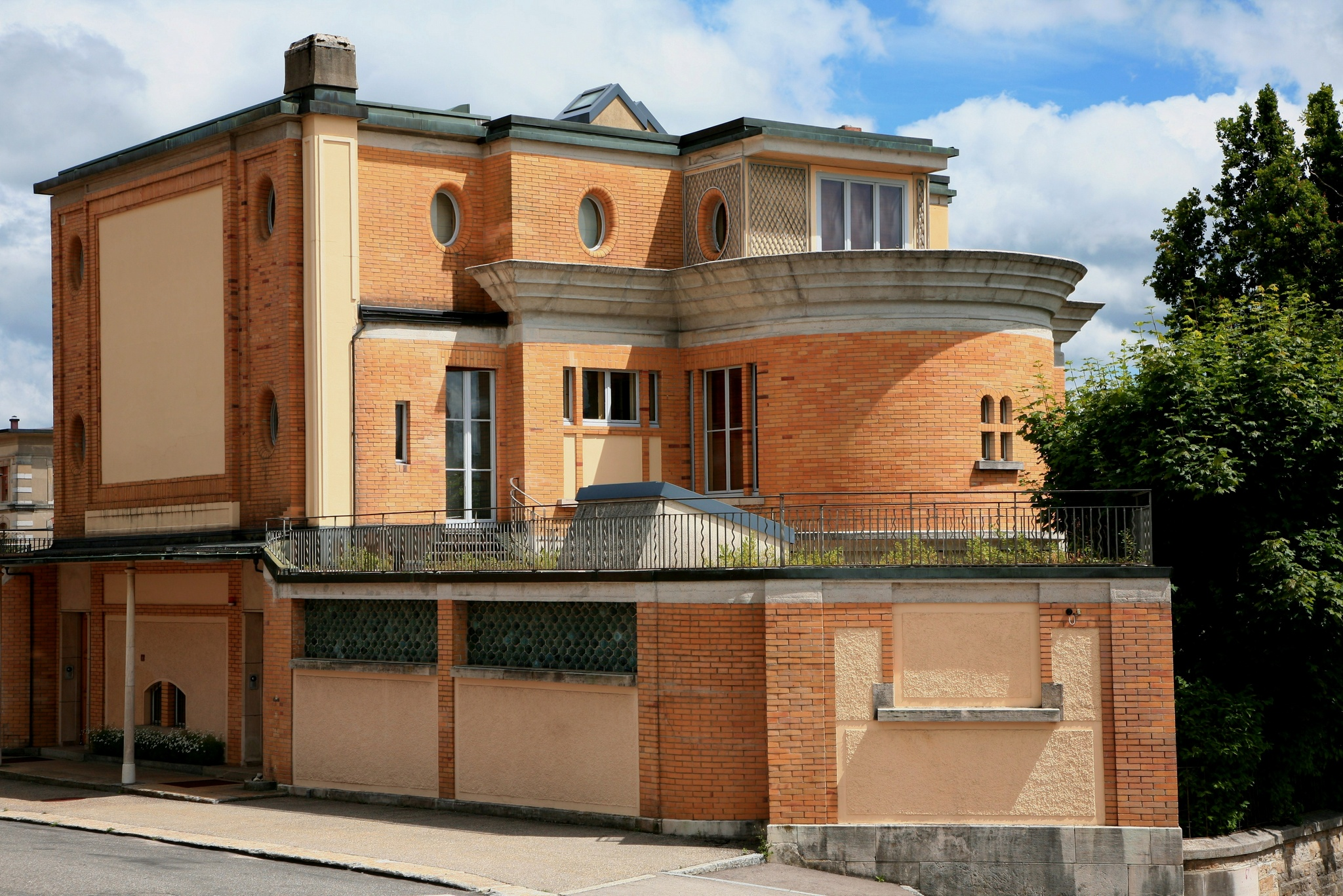

General information
- Location: Switzerland, La Chaux-de-Fonds
- Completed: 1912 -16

Design and construction
- Architect: Le Corbusier

Villa Schwob also Villa Turque is a house located in La Chaux-de-Fonds, Switzerland designed by noted architect Le Corbusier. It was commissioned in 1912 by the watchmaker Anatole Schwob, and completed in 1917. In 1986, this early masterpiece of Le Corbusier has been acquired by the group Ebel for its 75th anniversary to serve both as a reminder of its core values and as an inexhaustible source of inspiration for the brand.

== Design and construction ==
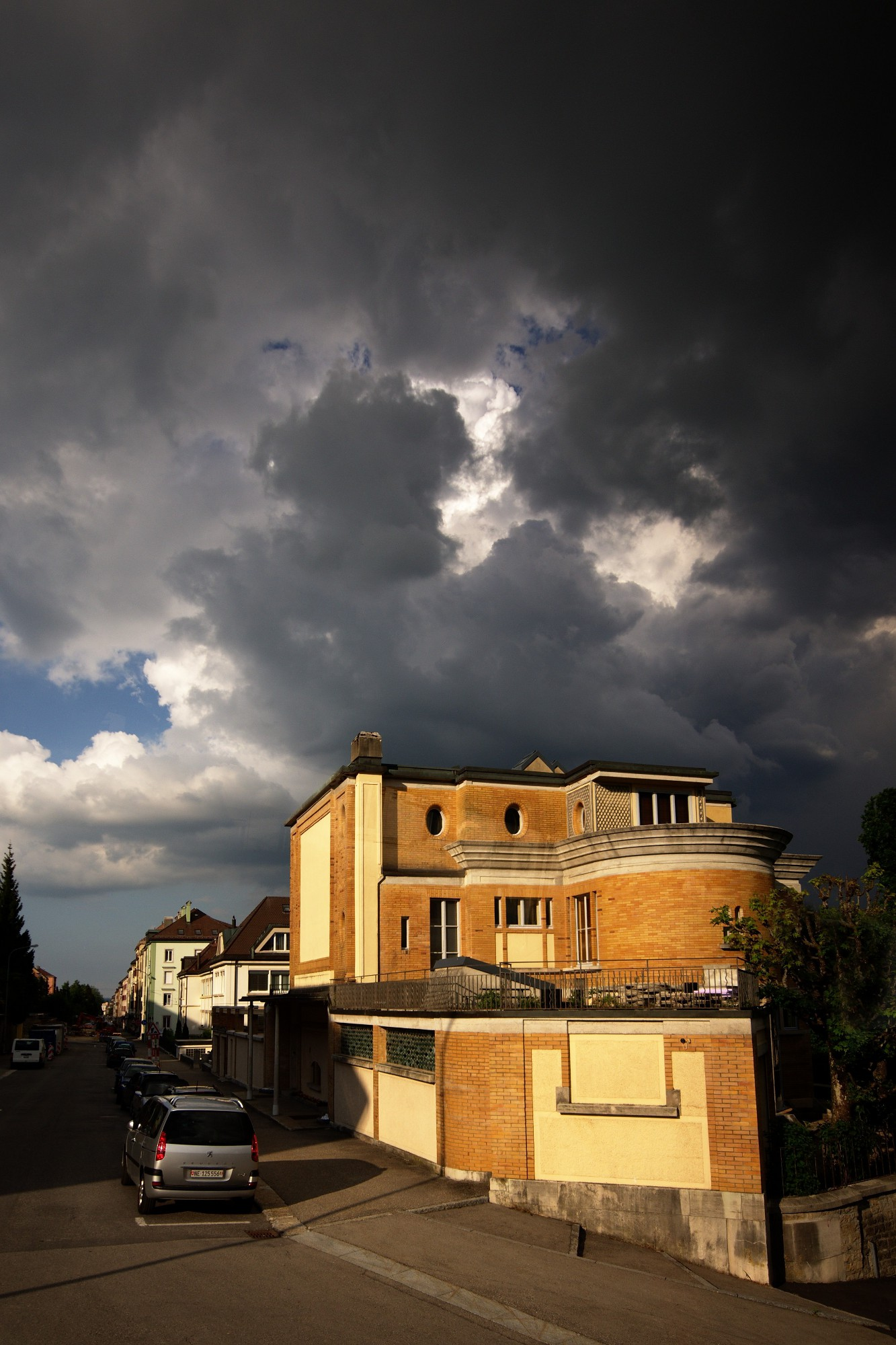
Villa Schwob

Le Corbusier used the Regulating Lines design principle in this building for the first time. This is the most known of his creations in La Chaux-de-Fonds. The villa includes symbols, technical and aesthetic aspects. It was completed before his move to Paris. The brick-work associated with concrete accentuates the oriental character of the house.

== Architectural Overview ==
Enclosed by high surrounding walls that ensure privacy, the house is integrated into its sloping plot. The structural composition spans three full primary stories in addition to a subterranean basement. Its interior organization and spatial flow are carefully arranged across several distinct levels, each serving dedicated functional zones:

- Ground Floor: Functions as the main public and social hub of the residence, featuring an expansive living room, a private office, a comprehensive library, a dedicated game room, and a formal dining room designed for hosting and family gatherings.
- Second Floor (First Floor in European Convention): Serves as the private family sanctuary, encompassing the primary family bedrooms alongside an open interior gallery that overlooks the main living area below.
- Top Floor: Originally designated as service and living quarters specifically for the household staff.

== Restoration Chronology & Heritage Preservation ==
Over the course of its history, the property underwent two major renovation and architectural restoration projects that transformed and preserved its structural integrity:

- 1957–1958 Restoration: Prominent Milanese architect Angelo Mangiarotti directed an extensive restoration, primarily focusing the interior while respecting the building's original framework.
- 1987 Onward Rehabilitation: Société Ebel commissioned and initiated a comprehensive, full-scale restoration of the estate. This featured interior design and conceptual work by French architect and designer Andrée Putman.

Recognizing its significant architectural value the house achieved formal designation as an official historical monument in 1995.
