= Cressier, Neuchâtel =

Cressier
- Municipality
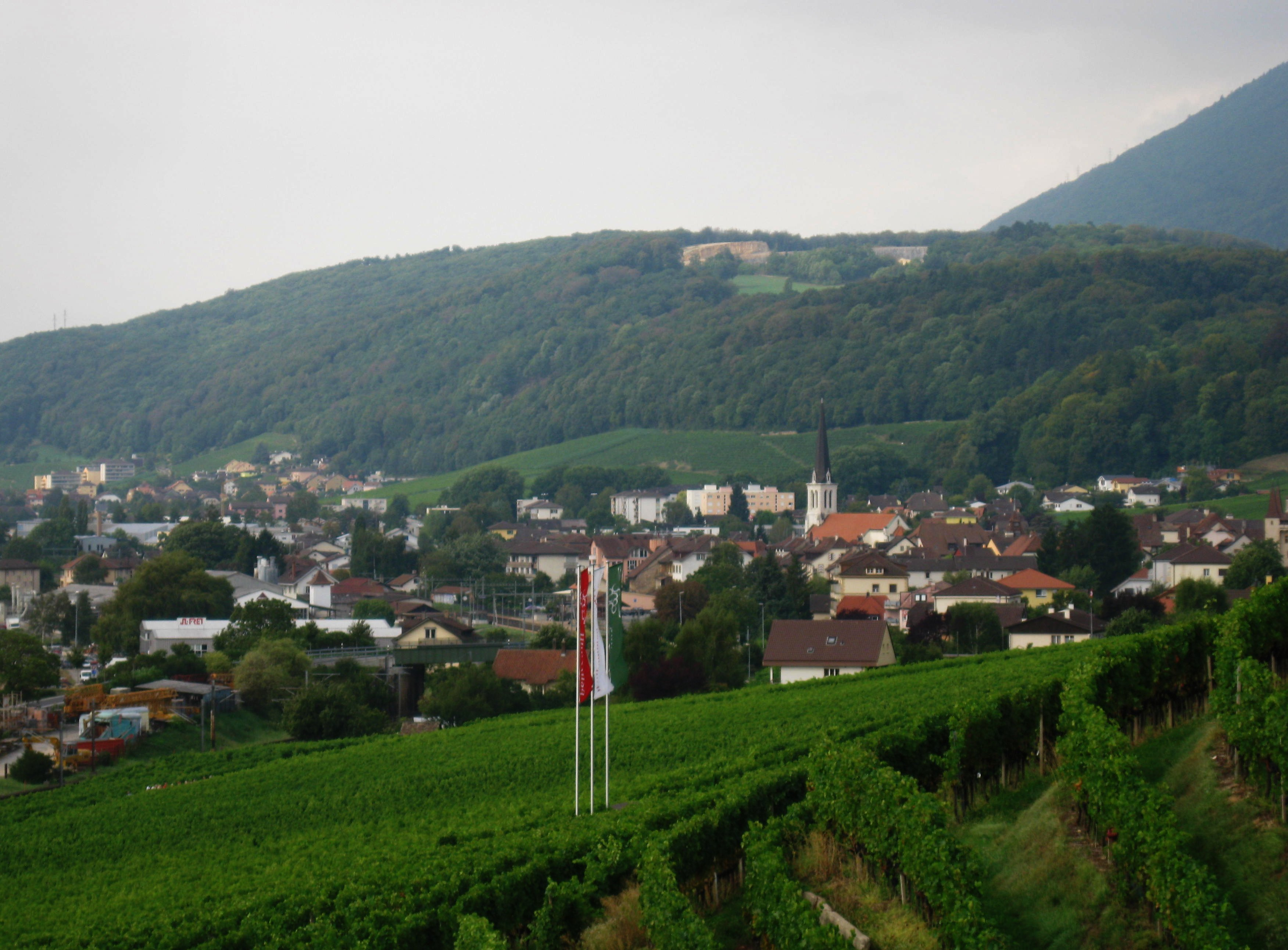
- Cressier village

- Coat of arms
- Location of Cressier
- Location within Switzerland Location within Canton of Neuchâtel
- Coordinates: 47°3′N 7°2′E
- Country: Switzerland
- Canton: Neuchâtel

Area
  - Total: 8.55 km^{2} (3.30 sq mi)
- Elevation: 436 m (1,430 ft)

Population (December 2007)
  - Total: 1,879
  - Density: 220/km^{2} (569/sq mi)
- Time zone: UTC+01:00 (CET)
  - Summer (DST): UTC+02:00 (CEST)
- Postal code: 2088
- SFOS number: 6452
- ISO 3166 code: CH-NE
- Surrounded by: Cornaux, Gals (BE), Laténa, Le Landeron, Neuchâtel
- Twin towns: Fegersheim (France)
- Website: www.cressier-ne.ch

Cressier is a municipality in the Swiss canton of Neuchâtel.

== History ==
Cressier is first mentioned in 1180 as Crisciaco.

== Geography ==
Aerial view (1965)

Cressier has an area, as of 2009, of 8.6 square kilometers (3.3 mi^{2}). Of this area, 2.4 km^{2} (0.93 mi^{2}) or 28.1% is used for agricultural purposes, while 4.67 km^{2} (1.80 mi^{2}) or 54.6% is forested. Of the rest of the land, 1.37 km^{2} (0.53 mi^{2}) or 16.0% is settled (buildings or roads), 0.1 km^{2} (25 acres) or 1.2% is either rivers or lakes and 0.06 km^{2} (15 acres) or 0.7% is unproductive land.

Of the built up area, industrial buildings made up 7.0% of the total area while housing and buildings made up 4.0% and transportation infrastructure made up 4.1%. Out of the forested land, 53.5% of the total land area is heavily forested and 1.2% is covered with orchards or small clusters of trees. Of the agricultural land, 14.2% is used for growing crops and 7.6% is pastures, while 6.3% is used for orchards or vine crops. All the water in the municipality is flowing water.

The municipality was located in the Neuchâtel district until the district level was eliminated on 1 January 2018. It is at the foot of the Jura Mountains and near the, flood-prone, Thielle river. It consists of the village of Cressier and the hamlet of Frochaux.

== Coat of arms ==
The blazon of the municipal coat of arms is Per fess, Or on a pale Gules three Chevrons Argent and Azure a Letter C Argent.

== Demographics ==
Cressier has a population (as of December 2020) of 1,892. As of 2008, 28.1% of the population are resident foreign nationals. Over the last 10 years (2000–2010) the population has changed at a rate of 3.4%. It has changed at a rate of 0.4% due to migration and at a rate of 3.6% due to births and deaths.

Most of the population (as of 2000) speaks French (1,537 or 79.9%) as their first language, Italian is the second most common (105 or 5.5%) and German is the third (99 or 5.1%). There are 2 people who speak Romansh.

As of 2008, the population was 50.3% male and 49.7% female. The population was made up of 676 Swiss men (35.6% of the population) and 279 (14.7%) non-Swiss men. There were 724 Swiss women (38.1%) and 219 (11.5%) non-Swiss women. Of the population in the municipality, 489 or about 25.4% were born in Cressier and lived there in 2000. There were 467 or 24.3% who were born in the same canton, while 390 or 20.3% were born somewhere else in Switzerland, and 512 or 26.6% were born outside of Switzerland.

As of 2000, children and teenagers (0–19 years old) make up 26.3% of the population, while adults (20–64 years old) make up 59.9% and seniors (over 64 years old) make up 13.8%.

As of 2000, there were 790 people who were single and never married in the municipality. There were 943 married individuals, 110 widows or widowers and 80 individuals who are divorced.

As of 2000, there were 699 private households in the municipality, and an average of 2.6 persons per household. There were 178 households that consist of only one person and 52 households with five or more people. In 2000, a total of 689 apartments (92.0% of the total) were permanently occupied, while 38 apartments (5.1%) were seasonally occupied and 22 apartments (2.9%) were empty. As of 2009, the construction rate of new housing units was 1 new units per 1000 residents. The vacancy rate for the municipality, in 2010, was 0.12%.

The historical population is given in the following chart:

== Heritage sites of national significance ==
The Former Church of St-Martin and Jeanjaquet Castle and the collection of Neolithic and Roman sites at the Ensemble de la Vieille Thielle are listed as Swiss heritage site of national significance. The entire village of Cressier is part of the Inventory of Swiss Heritage Sites.

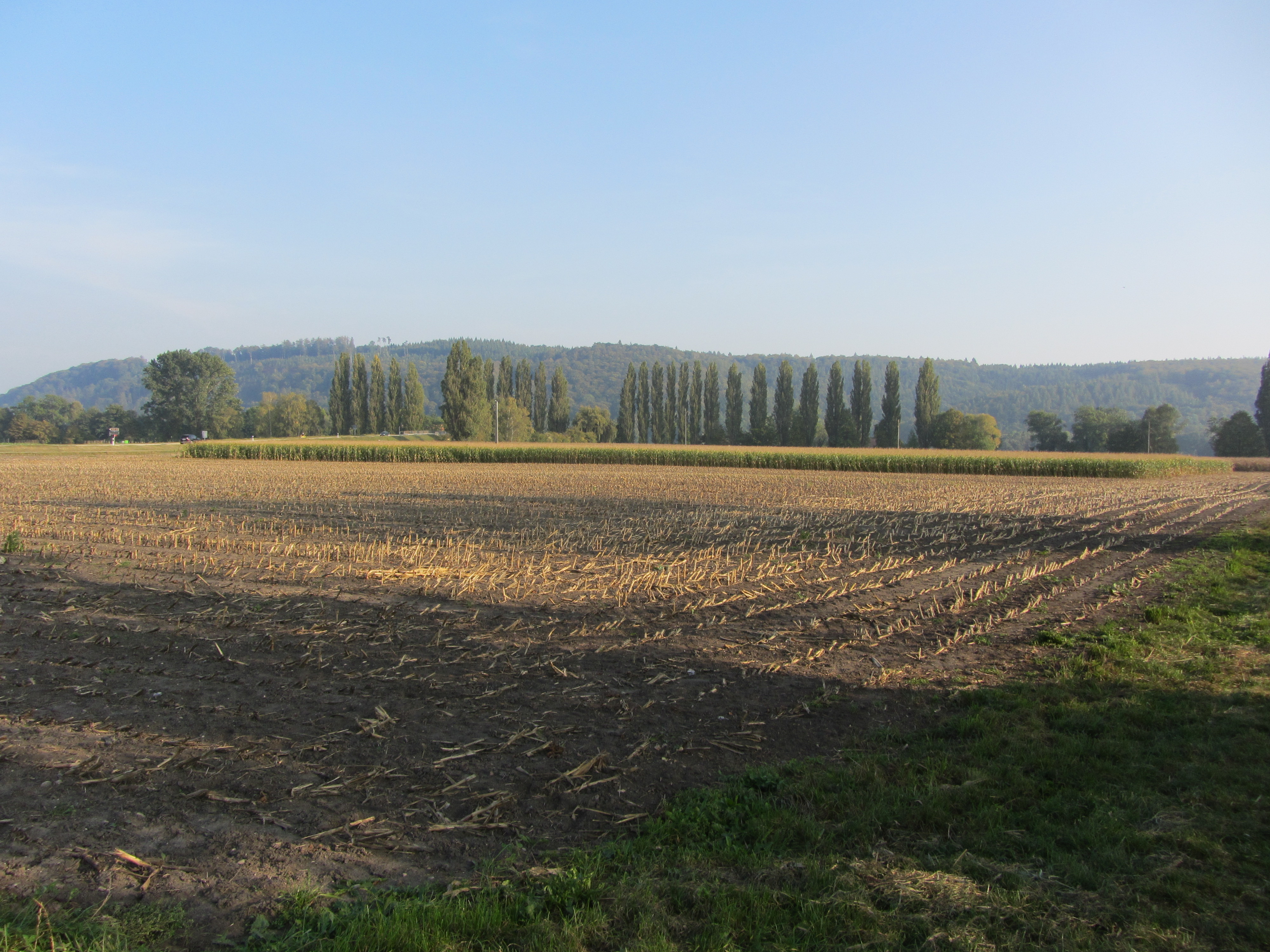
La Vieille Thielle, archeological site

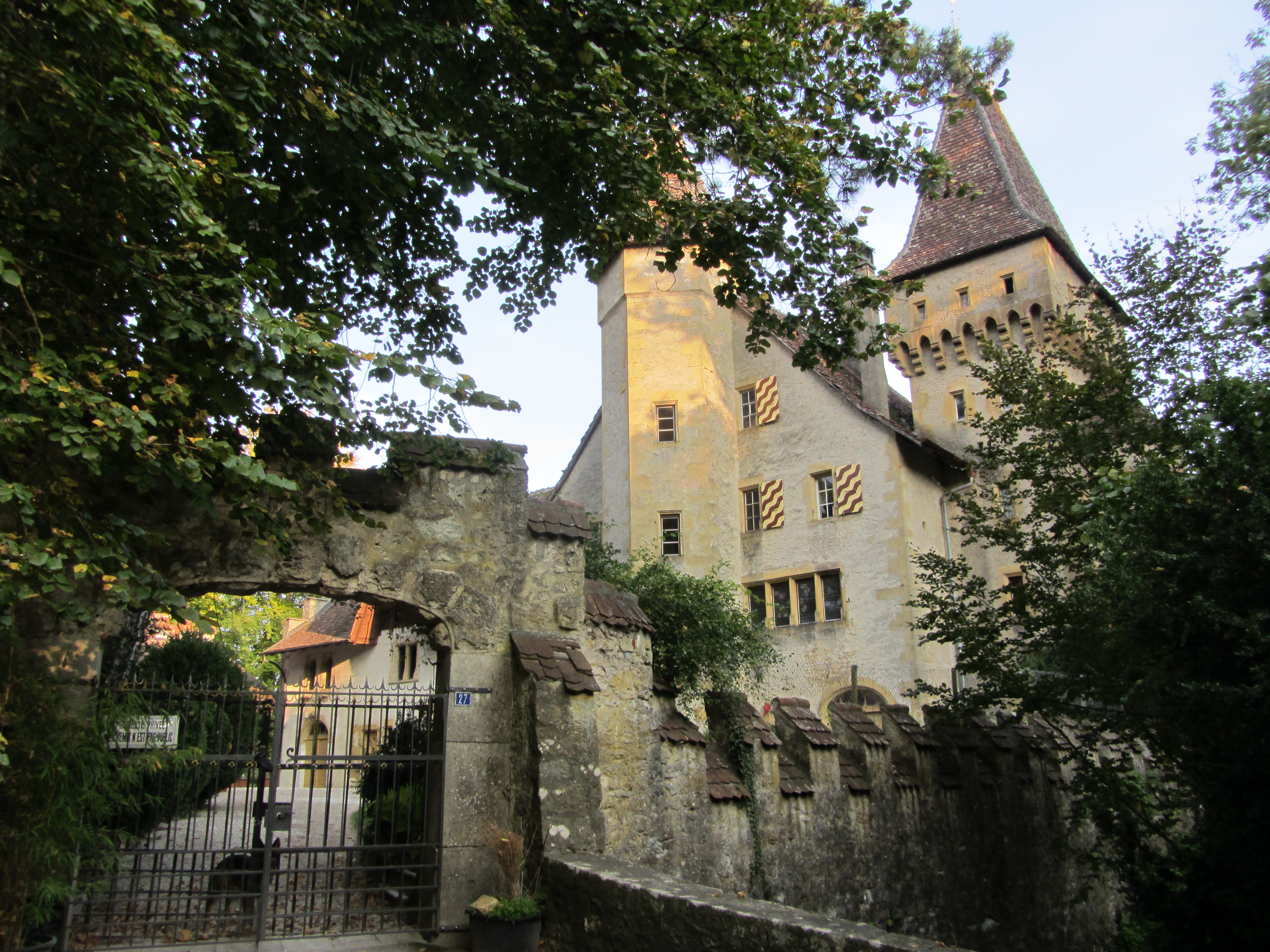
Jeanjaquet Castle

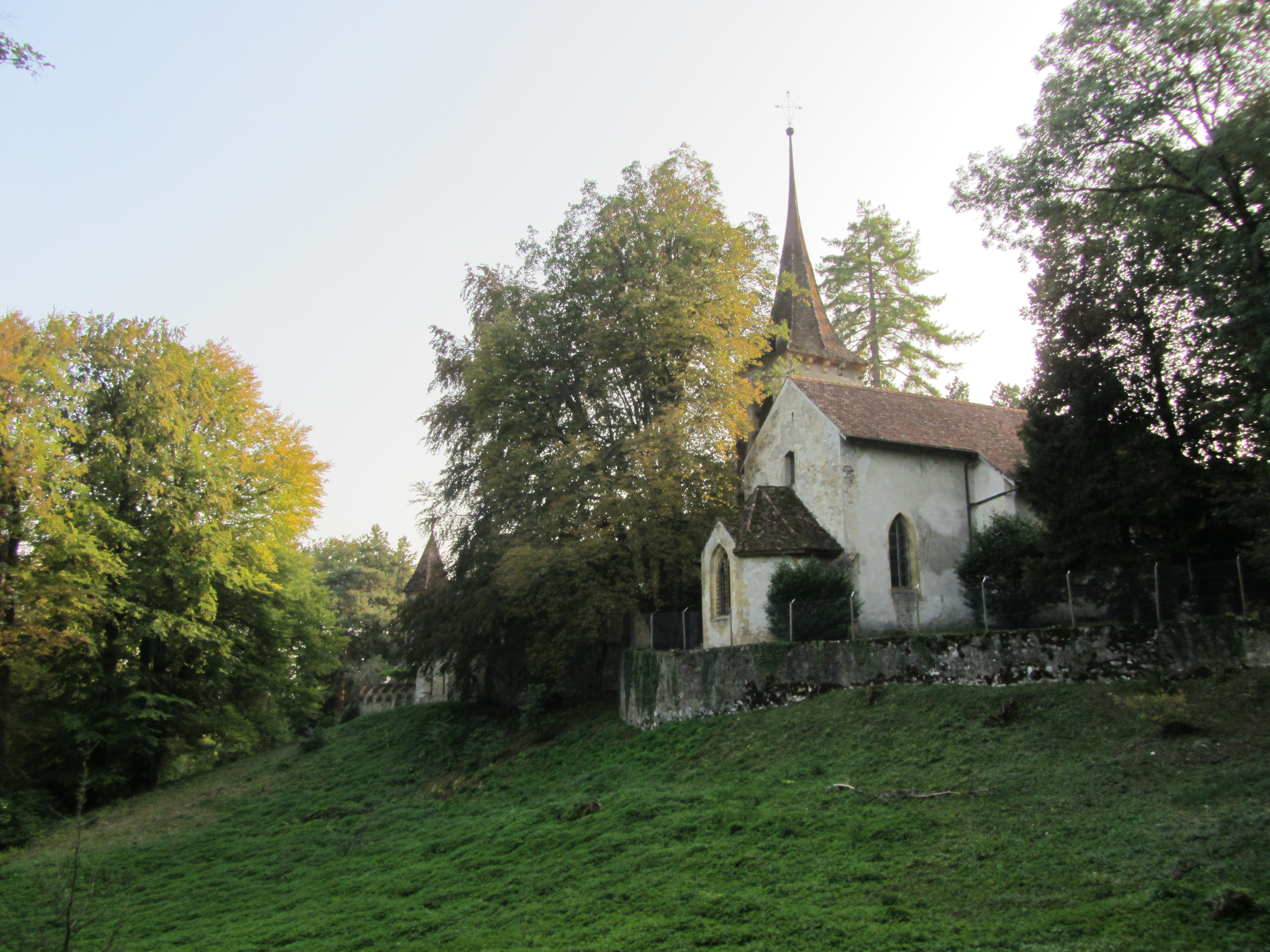
Former Church of St-Martin

== Politics ==
In the 2007 federal election the most popular party was the SP which received 26.22% of the vote. The next three most popular parties were the FDP (22.2%), the SVP (17.07%) and the LPS Party (11.86%). In the federal election, a total of 505 votes were cast, and the voter turnout was 48.9%.

== Economy ==
As of 2010, Cressier had an unemployment rate of 5%. As of 2008, there were 33 people employed in the primary economic sector and about 11 businesses involved in this sector. 750 people were employed in the secondary sector and there were 14 businesses in this sector. 303 people were employed in the tertiary sector, with 37 businesses in this sector. There were 987 residents of the municipality who were employed in some capacity, of which females made up 42.6% of the workforce.

In 2008 the total number of full-time equivalent jobs was 983. The number of jobs in the primary sector was 27, all of which were in agriculture. The number of jobs in the secondary sector was 704 of which 636 or (90.3%) were in manufacturing and 68 (9.7%) were in construction. The number of jobs in the tertiary sector was 252. In the tertiary sector; 99 or 39.3% were in wholesale or retail sales or the repair of motor vehicles, 6 or 2.4% were in the movement and storage of goods, 13 or 5.2% were in a hotel or restaurant, 1 was in the information industry, 6 or 2.4% were technical professionals or scientists, 11 or 4.4% were in education and 100 or 39.7% were in health care.

In 2000, there were 685 workers who commuted into the municipality and 604 workers who commuted away. The municipality is a net importer of workers, with about 1.1 workers entering the municipality for every one leaving. Of the working population, 10% used public transportation to get to work, and 60.6% used a private car.

== Religion ==
From the 2000 census, 895 or 46.5% were Roman Catholic, while 501 or 26.1% belonged to the Swiss Reformed Church. Of the rest of the population, there were 9 members of an Orthodox church (or about 0.47% of the population), there was 1 individual who belongs to the Christian Catholic Church, and there were 80 individuals (or about 4.16% of the population) who belonged to another Christian church. There were 39 (or about 2.03% of the population) who were Islamic. There were 2 individuals who were Hindu and 1 individual who belonged to another church. 343 (or about 17.84% of the population) belonged to no church, are agnostic or atheist, and 89 individuals (or about 4.63% of the population) did not answer the question.

== Education ==
In Cressier about 659 or (34.3%) of the population have completed non-mandatory upper secondary education, and 189 or (9.8%) have completed additional higher education (either university or a Fachhochschule). Of the 189 who completed tertiary schooling, 55.6% were Swiss men, 24.9% were Swiss women, 12.7% were non-Swiss men and 6.9% were non-Swiss women.

In the canton of Neuchâtel most municipalities provide two years of non-mandatory kindergarten, followed by five years of mandatory primary education. The next four years of mandatory secondary education is provided at thirteen larger secondary schools, which many students travel out of their home municipality to attend. During the 2010–11 school year, there were 2.5 kindergarten classes with a total of 44 students in Cressier. In the same year, there were 7 primary classes with a total of 122 students.

As of 2000, there were 18 students in Cressier who came from another municipality, while 150 residents attended schools outside the municipality.
