= Hégenheim =

Commune in Grand Est, France

- Commune
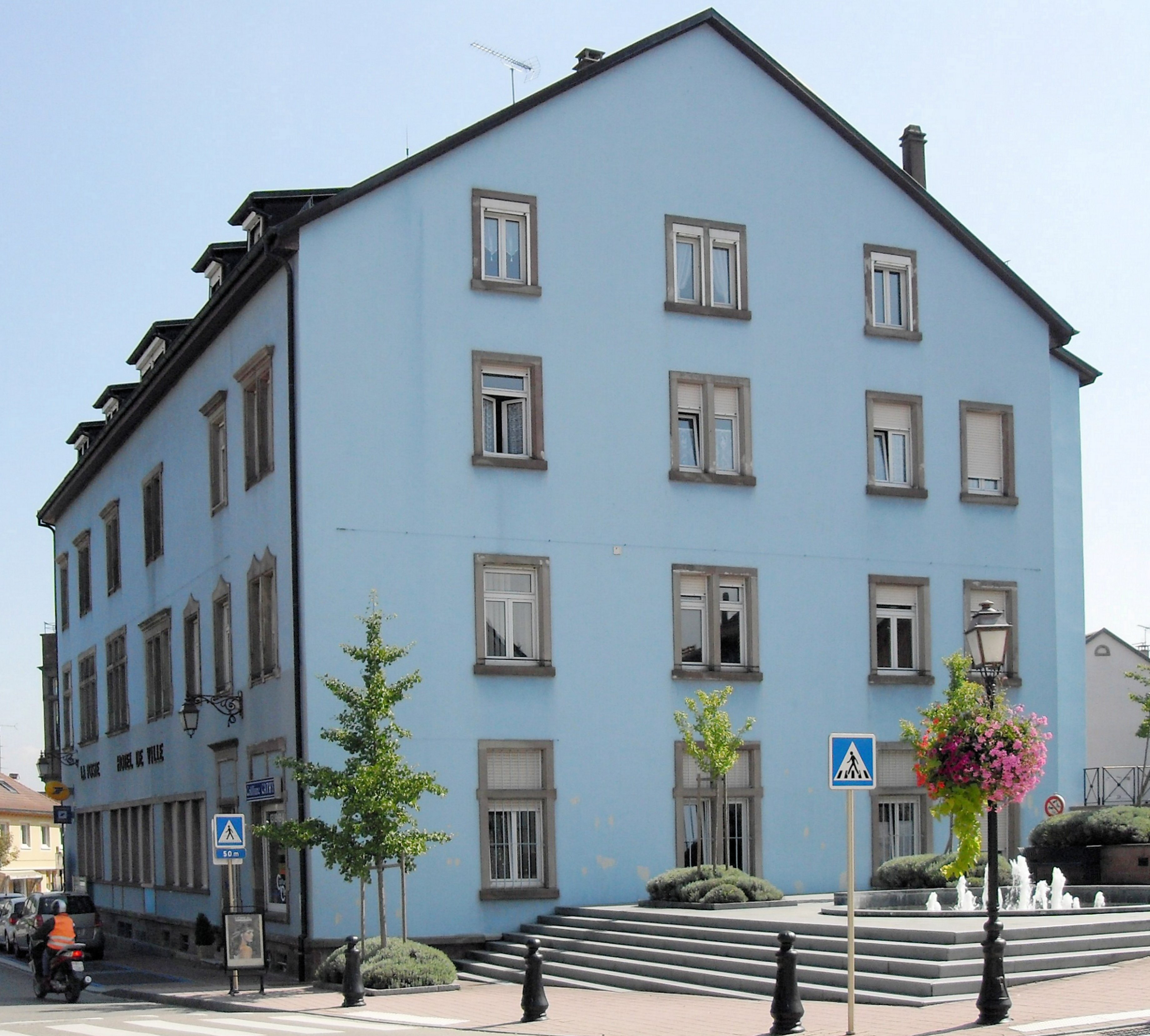
- The town hall in Hégenheim

- Coat of arms
- Location of Hégenheim
- Location within France Location within Grand Est
- Coordinates: 47°33′41″N 7°31′37″E
- Country: France
- Region: Grand Est
- Department: Haut-Rhin
- Arrondissement: Mulhouse
- Canton: Saint-Louis
- Intercommunality: Saint-Louis Agglomération

Government
  - Mayor (2020–2026): Thomas Zeller
- Area^{1}: 6.7 km^{2} (2.6 sq mi)
- Elevation: 275 m (902 ft)
- Highest elevation: 347 m (1,138 ft)
- Lowest elevation: 254 m (833 ft)
- Population (2023): 3,410
  - Density: 510/km^{2} (1,300/sq mi)
- Time zone: UTC+01:00 (CET)
  - Summer (DST): UTC+02:00 (CEST)
- INSEE/Postal code: 68126 /68220
- ^{1} French Land Register data, which excludes lakes, ponds, glaciers > 1 km^{2} (0.386 sq mi or 247 acres) and river estuaries.

Hégenheim (French pronunciation: [eɡənaim]; German: Hegenheim; Alsatian: Hagena) is a commune in Haut-Rhin, a department in Alsace in northeastern France. It is adjacent to the Swiss town of Allschwil, and is part of the Basel urban area.

== History ==
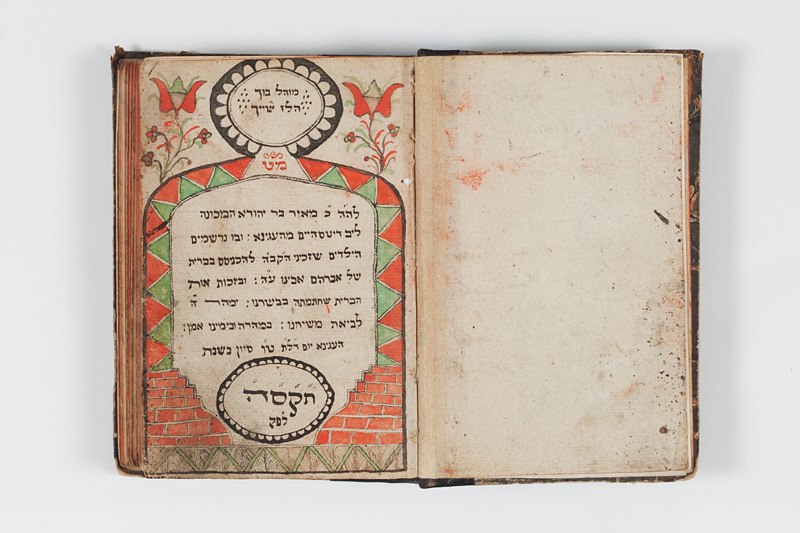
Mohel book, Hegenheim, 1805-1849.

In Roman important Roman roads crossed the district leading from Porrentruy to Augst and from Binningen to Rixheim. The village was under the control of the Diocese of Basel. The bishops granted the estate to vassals, among them the Baerenfels family in 1482, who kept it until 1700.

Louis XIV handed the domain to Laurent de Barbier, who commanded the fort Saint-Pierre in Freiburg im Breisgau and later directed the construction of the fortress of Huningue. He ended his life in Oleron as commander of the fortress. His sons, Laurent-Amable and Pierre undertook the construction of the castle, which was completed in 1737.

In the 17th century a strong Jewish community was established at the gates of Basel, where they were not tolerated. In 1673, Hannibal of Baerenfels sold the Jews a plot of land to be used as a synagogue, but it was instead used as a cemetery.

Due to restrictive laws in the region (notably in many Swiss cantons), Jews had trouble finding a place to bury their dead, so the cemetery of Hegenheim gained considerable importance. It contains about 8,000 graves. A synagogue was built in 1723, which invading troops burned down in June 1815. It was rebuilt in 1821 and a Jewish care home for the elderly opened in 1874. In 1838, there were 845 Jews living in Hegenheim.

Rising anti-Jewish sentiment came to a head in 1848, the year of revolutions. On April 23, 1848, a quarrel broke out because Hagenthal peasants had sung anti-Jewish songs. In a scuffle, a finger of a non-Jew was cut off. As a result the Jewish National Guard was disarmed by an angry mob, the Jews were attacked and several Jewish houses were stormed and completely devastated. One child was killed. Only the deployment of troops was able to end the riots on April 25.

== Climate ==
The climate in Hégenheim is an oceanic climate (Cfb under the Köppen climate classification), owing to its mild median temperatures and year-round precipitation. However, significant deviations from seasonal medians occur throughout the year, even without approaching record highs or lows. As a result, periods of severe cold can occur in winter despite relatively mild medians, while summer may experience scorching and dry spells. This variability reflects the village's continental location despite its oceanic climate, its exposure to Central European air masses, and the effects of climate change.

Climate data for Hégenheim, Alsace, France (medians and extremes 2024-present)
Month	Jan	Feb	Mar	Apr	May	Jun	Jul	Aug	Sep	Oct	Nov	Dec	Year
Record high °C (°F)	15.5 (59.9)	21.0 (69.8)	21.5 (70.7)	29.3 (84.7)	34.2 (93.6)	34.8 (94.6)	38.8 (101.8)	36.5 (97.7)	33.2 (91.8)	24.6 (76.3)	18.3 (64.9)	15.5 (59.9)	38.8 (101.8)
Mean maximum °C (°F)	13.9 (57.0)	14.8 (58.6)	21.0 (69.8)	26.2 (79.2)	33.2 (91.8)	32.1 (89.8)	37.6 (99.7)	36.1 (97.0)	32.7 (90.9)	23.0 (73.4)	17.6 (63.7)	15.0 (59.0)	37.6 (99.7)
Daily mean °C (°F)	1.9 (35.4)	6.0 (42.8)	8.1 (46.6)	11.9 (53.4)	14.6 (58.3)	19.7 (67.5)	20.6 (69.1)	21.4 (70.5)	15.9 (60.6)	11.6 (52.9)	5.9 (42.6)	3.3 (37.9)	11.0 (51.8)
Mean minimum °C (°F)	−8.3 (17.1)	−2.5 (27.5)	−3.5 (25.7)	−1.6 (29.1)	3.1 (37.6)	7.4 (45.3)	9.8 (49.6)	9.1 (48.4)	4.0 (39.2)	2.8 (37.0)	−6.5 (20.3)	−7.5 (18.5)	−9.5 (14.9)
Record low °C (°F)	−10.9 (12.4)	−5.4 (22.3)	−4.6 (23.7)	−2.0 (28.4)	3.1 (37.6)	7.3 (45.1)	8.5 (47.3)	8.4 (47.1)	2.2 (36.0)	1.1 (34.0)	−8.1 (17.4)	−9.5 (14.9)	−10.9 (12.4)
Average precipitation mm (inches)	71 (2.8)	46 (1.8)	38 (1.5)	53 (2.1)	68 (2.7)	94 (3.7)	67 (2.6)	114 (4.5)	143 (5.6)	104 (4.1)	80 (3.1)	43 (1.7)	929 (36.6)
Average snowfall cm (inches)	9.0 (3.5)	0.5 (0.2)	trace	trace	trace	0 (0)	0 (0)	0 (0)	0 (0)	trace	15.0 (5.9)	1.0 (0.4)	9.0 (3.5)
Average rainy days	12	9	8	10	11	11	13	7	12	13	11	6	117
Source: Weather Underground

== Population ==
Historical population
Year	Pop.	±% p.a.
1968	2,059	—
1975	2,226	+1.12%
1982	2,162	−0.42%
1990	2,310	+0.83%
1999	2,576	+1.22%
2007	3,005	+1.94%
2012	3,265	+1.67%
2017	3,420	+0.93%
2023	3,410	−0.05%
Source: INSEE

== See also ==
- Communes of the Haut-Rhin département
- Château de Hegenheim
