= Les Hauts-Geneveys =

- Former municipality
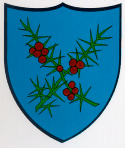
- Coat of arms
- Location of Les Hauts-Geneveys
- Location within Switzerland Location within Canton of Neuchâtel
- Coordinates: 47°3′N 6°53′E
- Country: Switzerland
- Canton: Neuchâtel
- District: Val-de-Ruz

Area
  - Total: 7.95 km^{2} (3.07 sq mi)
- Elevation: 986 m (3,235 ft)

Population (December 2011)
  - Total: 909
  - Density: 114/km^{2} (296/sq mi)
- Time zone: UTC+01:00 (CET)
  - Summer (DST): UTC+02:00 (CEST)
- Postal code: 2208
- SFOS number: 6481
- ISO 3166 code: CH-NE
- Surrounded by: Boudevilliers, Fontainemelon, Fontaines, La Chaux-de-Fonds, La Sagne
- Website: SFSO statistics

Les Hauts-Geneveys is a former municipality in the district of Val-de-Ruz in the canton of Neuchâtel in Switzerland.

The municipalities of Boudevilliers, Cernier, Chézard-Saint-Martin, Coffrane, Dombresson, Engollon, Fenin-Vilars-Saules, Fontainemelon, Fontaines, Les Geneveys-sur-Coffrane, Les Hauts-Geneveys, Montmollin, Le Pâquier, Savagnier and Villiers merged on 1 January 2013 into the new municipality of Val-de-Ruz.

== History ==
Les Hauts-Geneveys is first mentioned in 1342 as Geneveis sus Fontannes. In 1599 it was mentioned as Haultz Geneveys.

== Geography ==
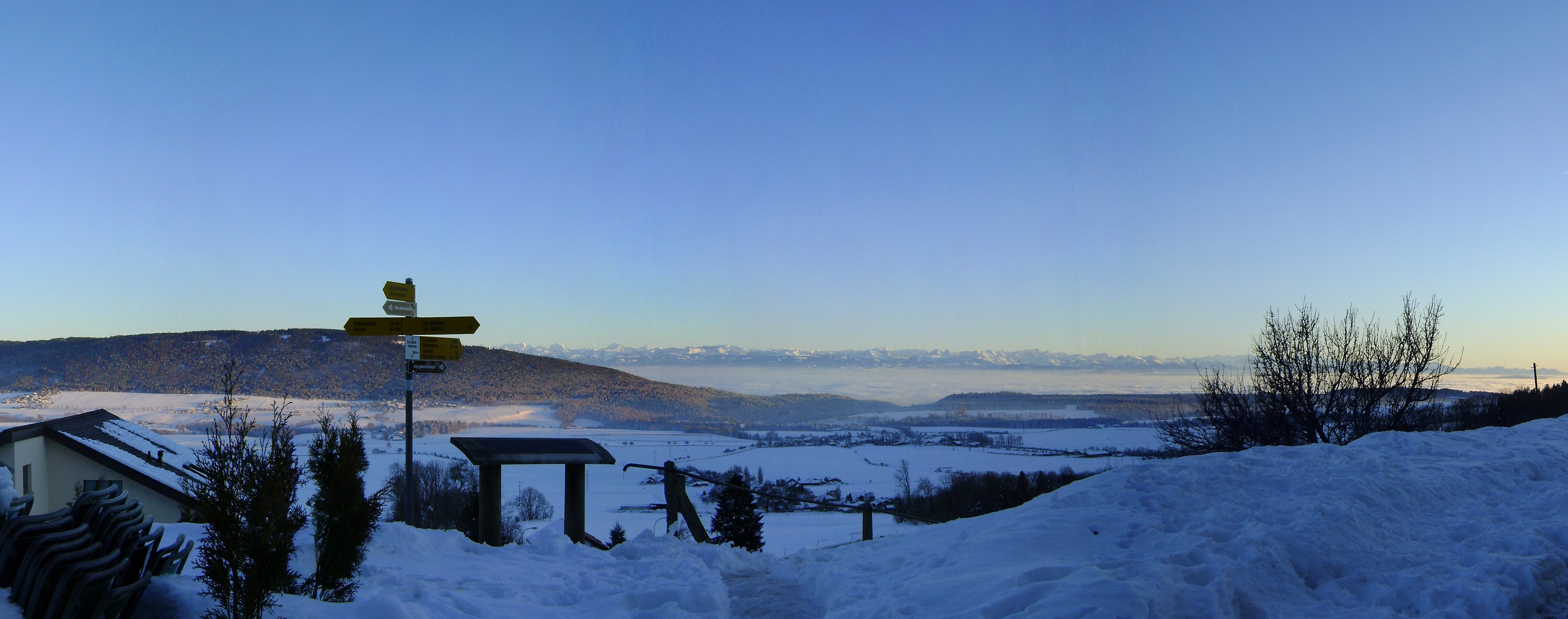
Les Hauts Geneveys

Aerial view (1949)

Les Hauts-Geneveys had an area, as of 2009, of 8 square kilometers (3.1 mi^{2}). Of this area, 3.88 km^{2} (1.50 mi^{2}) or 48.8% is used for agricultural purposes, while 3.59 km^{2} (1.39 mi^{2}) or 45.2% is forested. Of the rest of the land, 0.5 km^{2} (0.19 mi^{2}) or 6.3% is settled (buildings or roads).

Of the built up area, housing and buildings made up 2.8% and transportation infrastructure made up 3.3%. Out of the forested land, 39.4% of the total land area is heavily forested and 5.8% is covered with orchards or small clusters of trees. Of the agricultural land, 3.6% is used for growing crops and 12.3% is pastures and 32.7% is used for alpine pastures.

Les Hauts-Geneveys lies at an altitude of 986 meters (3,235 ft), 8 kilometers (5.0 mi) directly northwest of the canton capital, Neuchâtel. This high-altitude village in the Val-de-Ruz lies on the eastern slope of the Tête de Ran peak in the Jura Mountains. This location provides a view of the basin of the Val de Ruz, of the Swiss Plateau and a clear view up to the Swiss Alps.

The former municipality covers a small portion of the northwest part of the Val de Ruz syncline, and extends west up and over the wooded slope, called Forêt de la Baume, of the Tête de Ran anticline and down the slope of Tête de Ran peak to the heights known as Derrière Tête de Ran. On these Jura highlands are expansive meadows and isolated stands of spruce (Picea abies). In the far western part of the municipality there are two small basins at the northeastern edge of the Vallée des Ponts. The highest point of Les Hauts-Geneveys is 1,422 m (4,665 ft) on the southwest part of the Tête de Ran ridge on the Rochers Bruns.

== Coat of arms ==
The blazon of the municipal coat of arms is Azure, two Branches of Juniper tree Vert fructed Gules in saltire.

== Demographics ==
Les Hauts-Geneveys had a population (as of 2011) of 909. As of 2008, 10.0% of the population are resident foreign nationals. Over the last 10 years (2000–2010) the population has changed at a rate of -3.4%. It has changed at a rate of -9.4% due to migration and at a rate of 4.3% due to births and deaths.

Most of the population (as of 2000) speaks French (907 or 92.3%) as their first language, German is the second most common (34 or 3.5%) and Italian is the third (17 or 1.7%).

As of 2008, the population was 49.5% male and 50.5% female. The population was made up of 378 Swiss men (44.0% of the population) and 47 (5.5%) non-Swiss men. There were 388 Swiss women (45.2%) and 46 (5.4%) non-Swiss women. Of the population in the municipality, 148 or about 15.1% were born in Les Hauts-Geneveys and lived there in 2000. There were 435 or 44.3% who were born in the same canton, while 201 or 20.4% were born somewhere else in Switzerland, and 148 or 15.1% were born outside of Switzerland.

As of 2000, children and teenagers (0–19 years old) make up 22.5% of the population, while adults (20–64 years old) make up 66.6% and seniors (over 64 years old) make up 10.9%.

As of 2000, there were 455 people who were single and never married in the municipality. There were 423 married individuals, 36 widows or widowers and 69 individuals who are divorced.

As of 2000, there were 384 private households in the municipality, and an average of 2.3 persons per household. There were 125 households that consist of only one person and 23 households with five or more people. In 2000, a total of 375 apartments (86.0% of the total) were permanently occupied, while 50 apartments (11.5%) were seasonally occupied and 11 apartments (2.5%) were empty. As of 2009, the construction rate of new housing units was 14.6 new units per 1000 residents.

The historical population is given in the following chart:

== Politics ==
In the 2007 federal election the most popular party was the SP which received 28.22% of the vote. The next three most popular parties were the SVP (27.24%), the LPS Party (14.48%) and the FDP (12.41%). In the federal election, a total of 352 votes were cast, and the voter turnout was 57.1%.

== Economy ==
As of 2010, Les Hauts-Geneveys had an unemployment rate of 3.8%. As of 2008, there were 8 people employed in the primary economic sector and about 5 businesses involved in this sector. 44 people were employed in the secondary sector and there were 17 businesses in this sector. 196 people were employed in the tertiary sector, with 18 businesses in this sector. There were 482 residents of the municipality who were employed in some capacity, of which females made up 42.5% of the workforce.

In 2008 the total number of full-time equivalent jobs was 196. The number of jobs in the primary sector was 4, all of which were in agriculture. The number of jobs in the secondary sector was 42 of which 18 or (42.9%) were in manufacturing and 24 (57.1%) were in construction. The number of jobs in the tertiary sector was 150. In the tertiary sector; 3 or 2.0% were in wholesale or retail sales or the repair of motor vehicles, 1 was in the movement and storage of goods, 9 or 6.0% were in a hotel or restaurant, 1 was the insurance or financial industry, 3 or 2.0% were technical professionals or scientists, 5 or 3.3% were in education and 121 or 80.7% were in health care.

In 2000, there were 177 workers who commuted into the municipality and 376 workers who commuted away. The municipality is a net exporter of workers, with about 2.1 workers leaving the municipality for every one entering. Of the working population, 11.2% used public transportation to get to work, and 69.3% used a private car.

== Religion ==
From the 2000 census, 242 or 24.6% were Roman Catholic, while 417 or 42.4% belonged to the Swiss Reformed Church. Of the rest of the population, there was 1 individual who belongs to the Christian Catholic Church, and there were 70 individuals (or about 7.12% of the population) who belonged to another Christian church. There was 1 individual who was Jewish, and 4 (or about 0.41% of the population) who were Islamic. There were 3 individuals who belonged to another church. 225 (or about 22.89% of the population) belonged to no church, are agnostic or atheist, and 54 individuals (or about 5.49% of the population) did not answer the question.

== Education ==
In Les Hauts-Geneveys about 347 or (35.3%) of the population have completed non-mandatory upper secondary education, and 156 or (15.9%) have completed additional higher education (either university or a Fachhochschule). Of the 156 who completed tertiary schooling, 54.5% were Swiss men, 28.2% were Swiss women, 14.7% were non-Swiss men.

In the canton of Neuchâtel most municipalities provide two years of non-mandatory kindergarten, followed by five years of mandatory primary education. The next four years of mandatory secondary education is provided at thirteen larger secondary schools, which many students travel out of their home municipality to attend. During the 2010-11 school year, there was one kindergarten class with a total of 16 students in Les Hauts-Geneveys. In the same year, there were 2 primary classes with a total of 29 students.

As of 2000, there were 13 students in Les Hauts-Geneveys who came from another municipality, while 97 residents attended schools outside the municipality.
