= Alexis Maridor =

Swiss writer and publisher (1848-1909)

- Born: July 15, 1848; Fenin, Switzerland
- Died: 1909 (aged 60–61); Paris, France
- Occupations: Novelist, Publisher

Alexis Maridor (July 15, 1848 – 1909) was a French-speaking Swiss writer and publisher.

== Life ==
Maridor was born in Fenin in the canton of Neuchâtel.

He was editor of the radical political journal National Suisse, and in 1889 was elected to the grand council of La Chaux-de-Fonds, on the radical party list.

In 1899 his publishing house A. Maridor, located in La Chaux-de-Fonds, was liquidated.

Maridor died in Paris in 1909.

== Works (selection) ==
- La Récréation. Journal littéraire hebdomadaire. 1869.
- Le colonel (Jules) Philippin. Esquisse biographique par Alexis Maridor, Rédacteur du National Suisse. Suivie des Mémoires du colonel (autobiographie) rédigés par lui-même en 1881–1882, (avec son portrait). 1883.
- La Muse romande. Première année, 1890–1891. Avec pröface de Virgile Rossel. Zahn, La Chaux-de-Fonds 1891.
- Quelques notes sur la future organisation de l'établissement des jeunes garçons projeté à La Chaux-de-Fonds. Conseil général, La Chaux-de-Fonds 1891, OCLC 79692230.
- Le colonel Philippin. Esquisse biographique suivie des mémoires du colonel. 1893.
- mit E. Doutrebande: La Muse romande. Deuxième année, 1890–1893. Mit einem Vorwort von Henry Warnery. La Chaux-de-Fonds 1893.
- Nos fêtes. 1894–1897.
- Maître Brosse. Roman de mœurs suisses. Maridor, La Chaux-de-Fonds 1897, OCLC 718144990.

=== Editing of periodicals ===
- La Récréation : journal littéraire hebdomadaire. 1869
- La Muse romande. 1890-1893
- Nos fêtes. 1894-1897

== See also ==
- Swiss literature
