= Dombresson =

- Former municipality
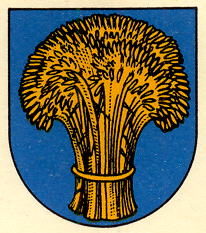
- Coat of arms
- Location of Dombresson
- Location within Switzerland Location within Canton of Neuchâtel
- Coordinates: 47°4′N 6°58′E
- Country: Switzerland
- Canton: Neuchâtel
- District: Val-de-Ruz

Area
  - Total: 12.77 km^{2} (4.93 sq mi)
- Elevation: 742 m (2,434 ft)

Population (December 2011)
  - Total: 1,607
  - Density: 125.8/km^{2} (325.9/sq mi)
- Time zone: UTC+01:00 (CET)
  - Summer (DST): UTC+02:00 (CEST)
- Postal code: 2056
- SFOS number: 6475
- ISO 3166 code: CH-NE
- Surrounded by: Chézard-Saint-Martin, Le Pâquier, Savagnier, Sonvilier (BE), Villiers
- Website: www.dombresson.ch

Dombresson is a former municipality in the district of Val-de-Ruz in the canton of Neuchâtel in Switzerland.

The municipalities of Boudevilliers, Cernier, Chézard-Saint-Martin, Coffrane, Dombresson, Engollon, Fenin-Vilars-Saules, Fontainemelon, Fontaines, Les Geneveys-sur-Coffrane, Les Hauts-Geneveys, Montmollin, Le Pâquier, Savagnier and Villiers merged on 1 January 2013 into the new municipality of Val-de-Ruz.

== History ==
Dombresson is first mentioned in 1178 as ecclesiam de Danbrizun.

== Geography ==
Aerial view (1949)

Dombresson had an area, as of 2009, of 12.8 square kilometers (4.9 mi^{2}). Of this area, 7.49 km^{2} (2.89 mi^{2}) or 58.7% is used for agricultural purposes, while 4.6 km^{2} (1.8 mi^{2}) or 36.0% is forested. Of the rest of the land, 0.66 km^{2} (0.25 mi^{2}) or 5.2% is settled (buildings or roads), 0.04 km^{2} (9.9 acres) or 0.3% is either rivers or lakes.

Of the built up area, housing and buildings made up 3.4% and transportation infrastructure made up 0.8%. Out of the forested land, 33.0% of the total land area is heavily forested and 3.1% is covered with orchards or small clusters of trees. Of the agricultural land, 20.7% is used for growing crops and 35.2% is pastures and 2.6% is used for alpine pastures. All the water in the municipality is flowing water.

The former municipality is located in the Val-de-Ruz district, along the old course of the Seyon river (before it was moved into a canal and covered in 1928) and on the Neuchâtel-Saint-Imier road. It consists of the village of Dombresson on the valley floor and the hamlet of Les Vieux Prés at an elevation of 1,030 m (3,380 ft) as well as scattered farm houses.

== Coat of arms ==
The blazon of the municipal coat of arms is Azure, a Garb Or.

== Demographics ==
Dombresson had a population (as of 2011) of 1,607. As of 2008, 9.3% of the population are resident foreign nationals. Over the last 10 years (2000–2010) the population has changed at a rate of 9.6%. It has changed at a rate of 5.8% due to migration and at a rate of 10.9% due to births and deaths.

Most of the population (as of 2000) speaks French (1,395 or 91.7%) as their first language, German is the second most common (44 or 2.9%) and Italian is the third (26 or 1.7%). There are 2 people who speak Romansh.

As of 2008, the population was 50.2% male and 49.8% female. The population was made up of 716 Swiss men (45.3% of the population) and 77 (4.9%) non-Swiss men. There were 725 Swiss women (45.9%) and 63 (4.0%) non-Swiss women. Of the population in the municipality, 403 or about 26.5% were born in Dombresson and lived there in 2000. There were 535 or 35.2% who were born in the same canton, while 318 or 20.9% were born somewhere else in Switzerland, and 221 or 14.5% were born outside of Switzerland.

As of 2000, children and teenagers (0–19 years old) make up 31.4% of the population, while adults (20–64 years old) make up 56.9% and seniors (over 64 years old) make up 11.8%.

As of 2000, there were 680 people who were single and never married in the municipality. There were 698 married individuals, 73 widows or widowers and 70 individuals who are divorced.

As of 2000, there were 567 private households in the municipality, and an average of 2.5 persons per household. There were 164 households that consist of only one person and 51 households with five or more people. In 2000, a total of 544 apartments (91.1% of the total) were permanently occupied, while 36 apartments (6.0%) were seasonally occupied and 17 apartments (2.8%) were empty. The vacancy rate for the municipality, in 2010, was 0.76%.

The historical population is given in the following chart:

== Heritage sites of national significance ==
The Farm House Aux Planches is listed as Swiss heritage site of national significance. The entire village of Dombresson is part of the Inventory of Swiss Heritage Sites.

== Politics ==
In the 2007 federal election the most popular party was the SVP which received 26.75% of the vote. The next three most popular parties were the SP (24.09%), the FDP (16.44%) and the LPS Party (13.17%). In the federal election, a total of 544 votes were cast, and the voter turnout was 48.8%.

== Economy ==
As of 2010, Dombresson had an unemployment rate of 3.3%. As of 2008, there were 55 people employed in the primary economic sector and about 25 businesses involved in this sector. 149 people were employed in the secondary sector and there were 18 businesses in this sector. 213 people were employed in the tertiary sector, with 38 businesses in this sector. There were 761 residents of the municipality who were employed in some capacity, of which females made up 42.4% of the workforce.

In 2008 the total number of full-time equivalent jobs was 329. The number of jobs in the primary sector was 43, of which 36 were in agriculture and 7 were in forestry or lumber production. The number of jobs in the secondary sector was 136 of which 92 or (67.6%) were in manufacturing and 44 (32.4%) were in construction. The number of jobs in the tertiary sector was 150. In the tertiary sector; 37 or 24.7% were in wholesale or retail sales or the repair of motor vehicles, 5 or 3.3% were in the movement and storage of goods, 14 or 9.3% were in a hotel or restaurant, 3 or 2.0% were in the information industry, 4 or 2.7% were technical professionals or scientists, 18 or 12.0% were in education and 22 or 14.7% were in health care.

In 2000, there were 143 workers who commuted into the municipality and 518 workers who commuted away. The municipality is a net exporter of workers, with about 3.6 workers leaving the municipality for every one entering. About 3.5% of the workforce coming into Dombresson are coming from outside Switzerland. Of the working population, 10.6% used public transportation to get to work, and 64.7% used a private car.

== Religion ==
From the 2000 census, 365 or 24.0% were Roman Catholic, while 712 or 46.8% belonged to the Swiss Reformed Church. Of the rest of the population, there were 3 members of an Orthodox church (or about 0.20% of the population), and there were 47 individuals (or about 3.09% of the population) who belonged to another Christian church. There were 33 (or about 2.17% of the population) who were Islamic. There were 1 individual who belonged to another church. 328 (or about 21.56% of the population) belonged to no church, are agnostic or atheist, and 52 individuals (or about 3.42% of the population) did not answer the question.

== Education ==
In Dombresson about 558 or (36.7%) of the population have completed non-mandatory upper secondary education, and 159 or (10.5%) have completed additional higher education (either university or a Fachhochschule). Of the 159 who completed tertiary schooling, 56.6% were Swiss men, 30.2% were Swiss women, 6.3% were non-Swiss men and 6.9% were non-Swiss women.

In the canton of Neuchâtel most municipalities provide two years of non-mandatory kindergarten, followed by five years of mandatory primary education. The next four years of mandatory secondary education is provided at thirteen larger secondary schools, which many students travel out of their home municipality to attend. The kindergarten is combined with Villiers and Le Pâquier while the primary school is combined with Villiers. During the 2010–11 school year, there were 3 kindergarten classes with a total of 50 students between the municipalities. In the same year, there were 8 primary classes with a total of 156 students.

As of 2000, there were 44 students in Dombresson who came from another municipality, while 145 residents attended schools outside the municipality.
