= Fontainemelon =

- Former municipality
- Coat of arms
- Location of Fontainemelon
- Location within Switzerland Location within Canton of Neuchâtel
- Coordinates: 47°3′N 6°53′E
- Country: Switzerland
- Canton: Neuchâtel
- District: Val-de-Ruz

Area
  - Total: 2.45 km^{2} (0.95 sq mi)
- Elevation: 864 m (2,835 ft)

Population (December 2011)
  - Total: 1,625
  - Density: 663/km^{2} (1,720/sq mi)
- Time zone: UTC+01:00 (CET)
  - Summer (DST): UTC+02:00 (CEST)
- Postal code: 2052
- SFOS number: 6478
- ISO 3166 code: CH-NE
- Surrounded by: Cernier, Fontaines, Les Hauts-Geneveys
- Website: www.fontainemelon.ch

Fontainemelon is a former municipality in the district of Val-de-Ruz in the canton of Neuchâtel in Switzerland.

The municipalities of Boudevilliers, Cernier, Chézard-Saint-Martin, Coffrane, Dombresson, Engollon, Fenin-Vilars-Saules, Fontainemelon, Fontaines, Les Geneveys-sur-Coffrane, Les Hauts-Geneveys, Montmollin, Le Pâquier, Savagnier and Villiers merged on 1 January 2013 into the new municipality of Val-de-Ruz.

== History ==
Fontainemelon is first mentioned about 1350 as Fontainnemelom. In 1358 it was mentioned as Fontannamillon.

== Geography ==
Aerial view (1949)

Fontainemelon had an area, as of 2009, of 2.5 square kilometers (0.97 mi^{2}). Of this area, 0.99 km^{2} (0.38 mi^{2}) or 40.4% is used for agricultural purposes, while 0.98 km^{2} (0.38 mi^{2}) or 40.0% is forested. Of the rest of the land, 0.52 km^{2} (0.20 mi^{2}) or 21.2% is settled (buildings or roads).

Of the built up area, housing and buildings made up 13.1% and transportation infrastructure made up 5.7%. while parks, green belts and sports fields made up 1.2%. Out of the forested land, 35.5% of the total land area is heavily forested and 4.5% is covered with orchards or small clusters of trees. Of the agricultural land, 11.0% is used for growing crops and 11.0% is pastures and 18.0% is used for alpine pastures.

The former municipality is located in the Val-de-Ruz district. It consists of the village of Fontainemelon and a portion of the hamlet of Les Loges, at an elevation of 1,230 m (4,040 ft).

== Coat of arms ==
The blazon of the municipal coat of arms is Tierced in pale, Gules, a Barulet wavy Argent, in chief a Mullet of Five Or, and in base a Watch of the same, Or, three Chevrons Sable, and Vert a Barulet wavy Argent, in chief a Mullet of Five Or, and in base a Plough of the same.

== Demographics ==
Fontainemelon had a population (as of 2011) of 1,625. As of 2008, 19.3% of the population are resident foreign nationals. Over the last 10 years (2000–2010) the population has changed at a rate of -0.4%. It has changed at a rate of -4.6% due to migration and at a rate of 3.3% due to births and deaths.

Most of the population (as of 2000) speaks French (1,427 or 88.9%) as their first language, Serbo-Croatian is the second most common (46 or 2.9%) and German is the third (40 or 2.5%). There are 38 people who speak Italian and 1 person who speaks Romansh.

As of 2008, the population was 48.5% male and 51.5% female. The population was made up of 630 Swiss men (38.2% of the population) and 169 (10.3%) non-Swiss men. There were 720 Swiss women (43.7%) and 129 (7.8%) non-Swiss women. Of the population in the municipality, 327 or about 20.4% were born in Fontainemelon and lived there in 2000. There were 601 or 37.4% who were born in the same canton, while 326 or 20.3% were born somewhere else in Switzerland, and 304 or 18.9% were born outside of Switzerland.

As of 2000, children and teenagers (0–19 years old) make up 24.2% of the population, while adults (20–64 years old) make up 60.1% and seniors (over 64 years old) make up 15.8%.

As of 2000, there were 643 people who were single and never married in the municipality. There were 787 married individuals, 85 widows or widowers and 90 individuals who are divorced.

As of 2000, there were 681 private households in the municipality, and an average of 2.3 persons per household. There were 218 households that consist of only one person and 39 households with five or more people. In 2000, a total of 668 apartments (92.1% of the total) were permanently occupied, while 40 apartments (5.5%) were seasonally occupied and 17 apartments (2.3%) were empty. As of 2009, the construction rate of new housing units was 8.8 new units per 1000 residents. The vacancy rate for the municipality, in 2010, was 0.64%.

The historical population is given in the following chart:

== Politics ==
In the 2007 federal election the most popular party was the SP which received 25.85% of the vote. The next three most popular parties were the SVP (25.23%), the LPS Party (14.07%) and the FDP (13.8%). In the federal election, a total of 527 votes were cast, and the voter turnout was 51.6%.

== Economy ==
As of 2010, Fontainemelon had an unemployment rate of 3.3%. As of 2008, there were 7 people employed in the primary economic sector and about 2 businesses involved in this sector. 653 people were employed in the secondary sector and there were 9 businesses in this sector. 276 people were employed in the tertiary sector, with 46 businesses in this sector. There were 818 residents of the municipality who were employed in some capacity, of which females made up 44.9% of the workforce.

In 2008 the total number of full-time equivalent jobs was 827. The number of jobs in the primary sector was 5, all of which were in agriculture. The number of jobs in the secondary sector was 640 of which 579 or (90.5%) were in manufacturing and 61 (9.5%) were in construction. The number of jobs in the tertiary sector was 182. In the tertiary sector; 68 or 37.4% were in wholesale or retail sales or the repair of motor vehicles, 8 or 4.4% were in the movement and storage of goods, 5 or 2.7% were in a hotel or restaurant, 1 was in the information industry, 4 or 2.2% were the insurance or financial industry, 6 or 3.3% were technical professionals or scientists, 16 or 8.8% were in education and 37 or 20.3% were in health care.

In 2000, there were 648 workers who commuted into the municipality and 609 workers who commuted away. The municipality is a net importer of workers, with about 1.1 workers entering the municipality for every one leaving. About 12.5% of the workforce coming into Fontainemelon are coming from outside Switzerland. Of the working population, 15.3% used public transportation to get to work, and 62.2% used a private car.

== Religion ==
From the 2000 census, 407 or 25.4% were Roman Catholic, while 741 or 46.2% belonged to the Swiss Reformed Church. Of the rest of the population, there were 2 members of an Orthodox church (or about 0.12% of the population), there was 1 individual who belongs to the Christian Catholic Church, and there were 73 individuals (or about 4.55% of the population) who belonged to another Christian church. There were 83 (or about 5.17% of the population) who were Islamic. There were 3 individuals who were Buddhist and 2 individuals who belonged to another church. 265 (or about 16.51% of the population) belonged to no church, are agnostic or atheist, and 64 individuals (or about 3.99% of the population) did not answer the question.

== Education ==
In Fontainemelon about 582 or (36.3%) of the population have completed non-mandatory upper secondary education, and 194 or (12.1%) have completed additional higher education (either university or a Fachhochschule). Of the 194 who completed tertiary schooling, 56.2% were Swiss men, 27.3% were Swiss women, 11.3% were non-Swiss men and 5.2% were non-Swiss women.

In the canton of Neuchâtel most municipalities provide two years of non-mandatory kindergarten, followed by five years of mandatory primary education. The next four years of mandatory secondary education is provided at thirteen larger secondary schools, which many students travel out of their home municipality to attend. During the 2010–11 school year, there were 2 kindergarten classes with a total of 38 students in Fontainemelon. In the same year, there were 6 primary classes with a total of 91 students.

As of 2000, there were 2 students in Fontainemelon who came from another municipality, while 140 residents attended schools outside the municipality.
