= Cernier =

- Former municipality
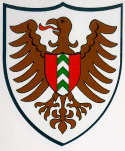
- Coat of arms
- Location of Cernier
- Location within Switzerland Location within Canton of Neuchâtel
- Coordinates: 47°3.45′N 6°54′E
- Country: Switzerland
- Canton: Neuchâtel
- District: Val-de-Ruz

Area
  - Total: 9.11 km^{2} (3.52 sq mi)
- Elevation: 820 m (2,690 ft)

Population (December 2011)
  - Total: 2,223
  - Density: 244/km^{2} (632/sq mi)
- Time zone: UTC+01:00 (CET)
  - Summer (DST): UTC+02:00 (CEST)
- Postal code: 2053
- SFOS number: 6472
- ISO 3166 code: CH-NE
- Surrounded by: Chézard-Saint-Martin, Engollon, Fontainemelon, Fontaines, Renan (BE)
- Website: www.cernier.ch

Cernier (French pronunciation: [sɛʁnje]) is the former capital of the district of Val-de-Ruz in the canton of Neuchâtel in Switzerland.

The municipalities of Boudevilliers, Cernier, Chézard-Saint-Martin, Coffrane, Dombresson, Engollon, Fenin-Vilars-Saules, Fontainemelon, Fontaines, Les Geneveys-sur-Coffrane, Les Hauts-Geneveys, Montmollin, Le Pâquier, Savagnier and Villiers merged on 1 January 2013 into the new municipality of Val-de-Ruz.

== History ==
Cernier is first mentioned in 1324 (702 years ago) as Cernies.

== Geography ==
Aerial view (1949)

Cernier had an area, as of 2009, of 9.1 square kilometers (3.5 mi^{2}). Of this area, 4.98 km^{2} (1.92 mi^{2}) or 54.7% is used for agricultural purposes, while 3.44 km^{2} (1.33 mi^{2}) or 37.8% is forested. Of the rest of the land, 0.68 km^{2} (0.26 mi^{2}) or 7.5% is settled (buildings or roads) and 0.01 km^{2} (2.5 acres) or 0.1% is unproductive land.

Of the built up area, housing and buildings made up 4.2% and transportation infrastructure made up 2.0%. Out of the forested land, 33.4% of the total land area is heavily forested and 4.4% is covered with orchards or small clusters of trees. Of the agricultural land, 12.4% is used for growing crops and 10.4% is pastures and 31.4% is used for alpine pastures.

The former municipality is located in the Val-de-Ruz district. It consists of the village of Cernier on the valley floor at an elevation of 750–800 m (2,460–2,620 ft) and the hamlet of Montagne de Cernier at an elevation of 1,190 m (3,900 ft).

== Coat of arms ==
The blazon of the municipal coat of arms is Argent, an Sparrow Hawk displayed Proper langued Gules, escutcheon Gules, on a pale Argent three Chevrons Vert.

== Demographics ==
Cernier had a population (as of 2011) of 2,223. As of 2008, 14.6% of the population are resident foreign nationals. Over the last 10 years (2000–2010) the population has changed at a rate of 14.7%. It has changed at a rate of 16% due to migration and at a rate of 1.3% due to births and deaths.

Most of the population (as of 2000) speaks French (1,727 or 89.9%) as their first language, German is the second most common (63 or 3.3%) and Italian is the third (49 or 2.6%). There is 1 person who speaks Romansh.

As of 2008, the population was 48.0% male and 52.0% female. The population was made up of 880 Swiss men (39.6% of the population) and 187 (8.4%) non-Swiss men. There were 1,016 Swiss women (45.7%) and 138 (6.2%) non-Swiss women. Of the population in the municipality, 399 or about 20.8% were born in Cernier and lived there in 2000. There were 709 or 36.9% who were born in the same canton, while 408 or 21.2% were born somewhere else in Switzerland, and 332 or 17.3% were born outside of Switzerland.

As of 2000, children and teenagers (0–19 years old) make up 24.5% of the population, while adults (20–64 years old) make up 59.5% and seniors (over 64 years old) make up 16%.

As of 2000, there were 738 people who were single and never married in the municipality. There were 946 married individuals, 117 widows or widowers and 120 individuals who are divorced.

As of 2000, there were 859 private households in the municipality, and an average of 2.2 persons per household. There were 310 households that consist of only one person and 49 households with five or more people. In 2000, a total of 835 apartments (90.3% of the total) were permanently occupied, while 72 apartments (7.8%) were seasonally occupied and 18 apartments (1.9%) were empty. As of 2009, the construction rate of new housing units was 18.2 new units per 1000 residents. The vacancy rate for the municipality, in 2010, was 0.77%.

The historical population is given in the following chart:

== Politics ==
In the 2007 federal election the most popular party was the SP which received 26.5% of the vote. The next three most popular parties were the SVP (21.39%), the LPS Party (16.47%) and the FDP (13.85%). In the federal election, a total of 736 votes were cast, and the voter turnout was 51.5%.

== Economy ==
As of 2010, Cernier had an unemployment rate of 5%. As of 2008, there were 13 people employed in the primary economic sector and about 7 businesses involved in this sector. 111 people were employed in the secondary sector and there were 28 businesses in this sector. 737 people were employed in the tertiary sector, with 101 businesses in this sector. There were 948 residents of the municipality who were employed in some capacity, of which females made up 45.5% of the workforce.

In 2008 the total number of full-time equivalent jobs was 673. The number of jobs in the primary sector was 10, all of which were in agriculture. The number of jobs in the secondary sector was 101 of which 60 or (59.4%) were in manufacturing and 41 (40.6%) were in construction. The number of jobs in the tertiary sector was 562. In the tertiary sector; 138 or 24.6% were in wholesale or retail sales or the repair of motor vehicles, 31 or 5.5% were in the movement and storage of goods, 11 or 2.0% were in a hotel or restaurant, 4 or 0.7% were in the information industry, 11 or 2.0% were the insurance or financial industry, 46 or 8.2% were technical professionals or scientists, 84 or 14.9% were in education and 93 or 16.5% were in health care.

In 2000, there were 542 workers who commuted into the municipality and 708 workers who commuted away. The municipality is a net exporter of workers, with about 1.3 workers leaving the municipality for every one entering. Of the working population, 15.5% used public transportation to get to work, and 63.1% used a private car.

== Religion ==
From the 2000 census, 794 or 41.3% belonged to the Swiss Reformed Church, while 553 or 28.8% were Roman Catholic. Of the rest of the population, there was one member of an Orthodox church, there were three individuals who belonged to the Christian Catholic Church, and there were 129 individuals (or about 6.72% of the population) who belonged to another Christian church. There were three individuals who were Jewish, and 56 (or about 2.92% of the population) who were Muslim. There were three individuals who were Buddhist and two individuals who belonged to another church. 350 (or about 18.22% of the population) belonged to no church, are agnostic or atheist, and 91 individuals (or about 4.74% of the population) did not answer the question.

== Education ==
In Cernier about 708 or (36.9%) of the population have completed non-mandatory upper secondary education, and 221 or (11.5%) have completed additional higher education (either university or a Fachhochschule). Of the 221 who completed tertiary schooling, 54.3% were Swiss men, 30.8% were Swiss women, 7.7% were non-Swiss men and 7.2% were non-Swiss women.

In the canton of Neuchâtel most municipalities provide two years of non-mandatory kindergarten, followed by five years of mandatory primary education. The next four years of mandatory secondary education is provided at thirteen larger secondary schools, which many students travel out of their home municipality to attend. During the 2010–11 school year, there were 3 kindergarten classes with a total of 56 students in Cernier. In the same year, there were 8 primary classes with a total of 153 students.

As of 2000, there were 580 students in Cernier who came from another municipality, while 69 residents attended schools outside the municipality.
