= Le Pâquier, Neuchâtel =

Le Pâquier
- Former municipality
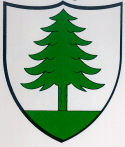
- Coat of arms
- Location of Le Pâquier
- Location within Switzerland Location within Canton of Neuchâtel
- Coordinates: 47°6′N 6°59′E
- Country: Switzerland
- Canton: Neuchâtel
- District: Val-de-Ruz

Area
  - Total: 9.58 km^{2} (3.70 sq mi)
- Elevation: 895 m (2,936 ft)

Population (December 2011)
  - Total: 198
  - Density: 20.7/km^{2} (53.5/sq mi)
- Time zone: UTC+01:00 (CET)
  - Summer (DST): UTC+02:00 (CEST)
- Postal code: 2058
- SFOS number: 6483
- ISO 3166 code: CH-NE
- Surrounded by: Dombresson, Saint-Imier (BE), Sonvilier (BE), Villiers
- Website: SFSO statistics

Le Pâquier (French pronunciation: [lə pakje]) is a former municipality in the district of Val-de-Ruz in the canton of Neuchâtel in Switzerland.

The municipalities of Boudevilliers, Cernier, Chézard-Saint-Martin, Coffrane, Dombresson, Engollon, Fenin-Vilars-Saules, Fontainemelon, Fontaines, Les Geneveys-sur-Coffrane, Les Hauts-Geneveys, Montmollin, Le Pâquier, Savagnier and Villiers merged on 1 January 2013 into the new municipality of Val-de-Ruz.

== History ==
Le Pâquier is first mentioned in 1328 as Pasquier.

== Geography ==
Le Pâquier had an area, as of 2009, of 9.6 square kilometers (3.7 mi^{2}). Of this area, 4.4 km^{2} (1.7 mi^{2}) or 45.9% is used for agricultural purposes, while 4.89 km^{2} (1.89 mi^{2}) or 51.0% is forested. Of the rest of the land, 0.26 km^{2} (0.10 mi^{2}) or 2.7% is settled (buildings or roads) and 0.03 km^{2} (7.4 acres) or 0.3% is unproductive land.

Of the built up area, housing and buildings made up 1.5% and transportation infrastructure made up 1.0%. Out of the forested land, 45.6% of the total land area is heavily forested and 5.4% is covered with orchards or small clusters of trees. Of the agricultural land, 0.9% is used for growing crops and 36.2% is pastures and 8.8% is used for alpine pastures.

The former municipality is located in the Val-de-Ruz district, in the north-east portion of the valley near the Neuchâtel-Saint-Imier road.

== Coat of arms ==
The blazon of the municipal coat of arms is Argent, issuant from a Base Vert a Pine-tree of the same.

== Demographics ==
Le Pâquier had a population (as of 2011) of 198. As of 2008, 5.6% of the population are resident foreign nationals. Over the last 10 years (2000–2010) the population has changed at a rate of -4.4%. It has changed at a rate of -5.8% due to migration and at a rate of 2.7% due to births and deaths.

Most of the population (as of 2000) speaks French (207 or 89.6%) as their first language, German is the second most common (22 or 9.5%) and Portuguese is the third (2 or 0.9%).

As of 2008, the population was 53.4% male and 46.6% female. The population was made up of 103 Swiss men (49.5% of the population) and 8 (3.8%) non-Swiss men. There were 93 Swiss women (44.7%) and 4 (1.9%) non-Swiss women. Of the population in the municipality, 95 or about 41.1% were born in Le Pâquier and lived there in 2000. There were 72 or 31.2% who were born in the same canton, while 44 or 19.0% were born somewhere else in Switzerland, and 13 or 5.6% were born outside of Switzerland.

As of 2000, children and teenagers (0–19 years old) make up 27.3% of the population, while adults (20–64 years old) make up 61.5% and seniors (over 64 years old) make up 11.3%.

As of 2000, there were 102 people who were single and never married in the municipality. There were 115 married individuals, 8 widows or widowers and 6 individuals who are divorced.

As of 2000, there were 83 private households in the municipality, and an average of 2.7 persons per household. There were 20 households that consist of only one person and 11 households with five or more people. In 2000, a total of 79 apartments (78.2% of the total) were permanently occupied, while 15 apartments (14.9%) were seasonally occupied and 7 apartments (6.9%) were empty. The vacancy rate for the municipality, in 2010, was 1.94%.

The historical population is given in the following chart:

== Politics ==
In the 2007 federal election the most popular party was the SVP which received 28.94% of the vote. The next three most popular parties were the SP (26.6%), the LPS Party (14.26%) and the FDP (12.34%). In the federal election, a total of 97 votes were cast, and the voter turnout was 58.1%.

== Economy ==
As of 2010, Le Pâquier had an unemployment rate of 1.8%. As of 2008, there were 37 people employed in the primary economic sector and about 16 businesses involved in this sector. 4 people were employed in the secondary sector and there were 2 businesses in this sector. 10 people were employed in the tertiary sector, with 6 businesses in this sector. There were 124 residents of the municipality who were employed in some capacity, of which females made up 42.7% of the workforce.

In 2008 the total number of full-time equivalent jobs was 39. The number of jobs in the primary sector was 26, of which 24 were in agriculture and 1 was in forestry or lumber production. The number of jobs in the secondary sector was 4, all of which were in manufacturing. The number of jobs in the tertiary sector was 9. In the tertiary sector; 2 were in wholesale or retail sales or the repair of motor vehicles, 5 were in a hotel or restaurant and 1 was a technical professional or scientist.

In 2000, there were 18 workers who commuted into the municipality and 67 workers who commuted away. The municipality is a net exporter of workers, with about 3.7 workers leaving the municipality for every one entering. Of the working population, 1.6% used public transportation to get to work, and 58.1% used a private car.

== Religion ==
From the 2000 census, 16 or 6.9% were Roman Catholic, while 147 or 63.6% belonged to the Swiss Reformed Church. Of the rest of the population, there were 26 individuals (or about 11.26% of the population) who belonged to another Christian church. There were 1 individual who belonged to another church. 43 (or about 18.61% of the population) belonged to no church, are agnostic or atheist, and 11 individuals (or about 4.76% of the population) did not answer the question.

== Education ==
In Le Pâquier about 69 or (29.9%) of the population have completed non-mandatory upper secondary education, and 32 or (13.9%) have completed additional higher education (either university or a Fachhochschule). Of the 32 who completed tertiary schooling, 43.8% were Swiss men, 46.9% were Swiss women.

In the canton of Neuchâtel most municipalities provide two years of non-mandatory kindergarten, followed by five years of mandatory primary education. The next four years of mandatory secondary education is provided at thirteen larger secondary schools, which many students travel out of their home municipality to attend. The kindergarten in Le Pâquier is combined with Dombresson and Villiers. During the 2010-11 school year, there were 3 kindergarten classes with a total of 50 students between the municipalities. In the same year, there was one primary class with a total of 16 students.

As of 2000, there were 13 students in Le Pâquier who came from another municipality, while 28 residents attended schools outside the municipality.
