= Chézard-Saint-Martin =

- Former municipality
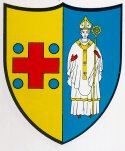
- Coat of arms
- Location of Chézard-Saint-Martin
- Location within Switzerland Location within Canton of Neuchâtel
- Coordinates: 47°4′N 6°55′E
- Country: Switzerland
- Canton: Neuchâtel
- District: Val-de-Ruz

Area
  - Total: 13.05 km^{2} (5.04 sq mi)
- Elevation: 764 m (2,507 ft)

Population (December 2011)
  - Total: 1,788
  - Density: 137.0/km^{2} (354.9/sq mi)
- Time zone: UTC+01:00 (CET)
  - Summer (DST): UTC+02:00 (CEST)
- Postal code: 2054
- SFOS number: 6473
- ISO 3166 code: CH-NE
- Surrounded by: Cernier, Dombresson, Engollon, Renan (BE), Savagnier, Sonvilier (BE)
- Website: chezard-saint-martin.ne.ch

Chézard-Saint-Martin is a former municipality in the district of Val-de-Ruz in the canton of Neuchâtel in Switzerland.

The municipalities of Boudevilliers, Cernier, Chézard-Saint-Martin, Coffrane, Dombresson, Engollon, Fenin-Vilars-Saules, Fontainemelon, Fontaines, Les Geneveys-sur-Coffrane, Les Hauts-Geneveys, Montmollin, Le Pâquier, Savagnier and Villiers merged on 1 January 2013 into the new municipality of Val-de-Ruz.

== History ==
Saint-Martin is first mentioned in 998 as Sancto Martino. Petit-Chézard was mentioned in 1143 as Esser, while Grand-Chézard was first mentioned in 1285 as Chesas.

== Geography ==
Aerial view (1967)

Chézard-Saint-Martin had an area, as of 2009, of 13.1 square kilometers (5.1 mi^{2}). Of this area, 7.36 km^{2} (2.84 mi^{2}) or 56.4% is used for agricultural purposes, while 4.97 km^{2} (1.92 mi^{2}) or 38.1% is forested. Of the rest of the land, 0.69 km^{2} (0.27 mi^{2}) or 5.3% is settled (buildings or roads).

Of the built up area, housing and buildings made up 3.7% and transportation infrastructure made up 1.1%. Out of the forested land, 34.4% of the total land area is heavily forested and 3.7% is covered with orchards or small clusters of trees. Of the agricultural land, 18.2% is used for growing crops and 28.9% is pastures and 9.0% is used for alpine pastures.

The former municipality is located in the Val-de-Ruz district. It consists of the villages of Saint-Martin, Grand-Chézard and Petit-Chézard.

== Coat of arms ==
The blazon of the municipal coat of arms is Per pale Or, a Cross couped Gules between four Hurts, and Azure, Saint Martin statant holding a crosier Or.

== Demographics ==
Chézard-Saint-Martin had a population (as of 2011) of 1,788. As of 2008, 9.0% of the population are resident foreign nationals. Over the last 10 years (2000–2010) the population has changed at a rate of 12.4%. It has changed at a rate of 8.9% due to migration and at a rate of 5.3% due to births and deaths.

Most of the population (as of 2000) speaks French (1,494 or 93.3%) as their first language, German is the second most common (41 or 2.6%) and Italian is the third (14 or 0.9%). There is 1 person who speaks Romansh.

As of 2008, the population was 49.0% male and 51.0% female. The population was made up of 797 Swiss men (44.4% of the population) and 83 (4.6%) non-Swiss men. There were 849 Swiss women (47.3%) and 66 (3.7%) non-Swiss women. Of the population in the municipality, 395 or about 24.7% were born in Chézard-Saint-Martin and lived there in 2000. There were 617 or 38.5% who were born in the same canton, while 362 or 22.6% were born somewhere else in Switzerland, and 193 or 12.1% were born outside of Switzerland.

As of 2000, children and teenagers (0–19 years old) make up 28.4% of the population, while adults (20–64 years old) make up 59.6% and seniors (over 64 years old) make up 12%.

As of 2000, there were 658 people who were single and never married in the municipality. There were 773 married individuals, 75 widows or widowers and 95 individuals who are divorced.

As of 2000, there were 608 private households in the municipality, and an average of 2.6 persons per household. There were 151 households that consist of only one person and 69 households with five or more people. In 2000, a total of 591 apartments (89.3% of the total) were permanently occupied, while 53 apartments (8.0%) were seasonally occupied and 18 apartments (2.7%) were empty. As of 2009, the construction rate of new housing units was 0.6 new units per 1000 residents. The vacancy rate for the municipality, in 2010, was 0.27%.

The historical population is given in the following chart:

== Heritage sites of national significance ==
The farm house at Rue Jean-Labran 4 and the farm house at Rue Jean-Labran 6 are listed as Swiss heritage site of national significance.

== Politics ==
In the 2007 federal election the most popular party was the SP which received 20.62% of the vote. The next three most popular parties were the SVP (20.56%), the LPS Party (19.95%) and the FDP (13.66%). In the federal election, a total of 708 votes were cast, and the voter turnout was 60.9%.

== Economy ==
As of 2010, Chézard-Saint-Martin had an unemployment rate of 3.4%. As of 2008, there were 50 people employed in the primary economic sector and about 20 businesses involved in this sector. 76 people were employed in the secondary sector and there were 23 businesses in this sector. 196 people were employed in the tertiary sector, with 42 businesses in this sector. There were 809 residents of the municipality who were employed in some capacity, of which females made up 42.0% of the workforce.

In 2008 the total number of full-time equivalent jobs was 253. The number of jobs in the primary sector was 42, of which 41 were in agriculture and 1 was in forestry or lumber production. The number of jobs in the secondary sector was 64 of which 44 or (68.8%) were in manufacturing and 18 (28.1%) were in construction. The number of jobs in the tertiary sector was 147. In the tertiary sector; 37 or 25.2% were in wholesale or retail sales or the repair of motor vehicles, 27 or 18.4% were in the movement and storage of goods, 4 or 2.7% were in a hotel or restaurant, 5 or 3.4% were in the information industry, 1 was the insurance or financial industry, 10 or 6.8% were technical professionals or scientists, 9 or 6.1% were in education and 35 or 23.8% were in health care.

In 2000, there were 124 workers who commuted into the municipality and 608 workers who commuted away. The municipality is a net exporter of workers, with about 4.9 workers leaving the municipality for every one entering. About 3.2% of the workforce coming into Chézard-Saint-Martin are coming from outside Switzerland. Of the working population, 10.5% used public transportation to get to work, and 70.2% used a private car.

== Religion ==
From the 2000 census, 321 or 20.0% were Roman Catholic, while 789 or 49.3% belonged to the Swiss Reformed Church. Of the rest of the population, there were 11 members of an Orthodox church (or about 0.69% of the population), there were 5 individuals (or about 0.31% of the population) who belonged to the Christian Catholic Church, and there were 125 individuals (or about 7.81% of the population) who belonged to another Christian church. There was 1 individual who was Jewish, and 13 (or about 0.81% of the population) who were Islamic. There were 7 individuals who were Buddhist and 5 individuals who belonged to another church. 325 (or about 20.30% of the population) belonged to no church, are agnostic or atheist, and 59 individuals (or about 3.69% of the population) did not answer the question.

== Education ==
In Chézard-Saint-Martin about 558 or (34.9%) of the population have completed non-mandatory upper secondary education, and 253 or (15.8%) have completed additional higher education (either university or a Fachhochschule). Of the 253 who completed tertiary schooling, 57.7% were Swiss men, 30.0% were Swiss women, 7.5% were non-Swiss men and 4.7% were non-Swiss women.

In the canton of Neuchâtel most municipalities provide two years of non-mandatory kindergarten, followed by five years of mandatory primary education. The next four years of mandatory secondary education is provided at thirteen larger secondary schools, which many students travel out of their home municipality to attend. During the 2010–11 school year, there were 2 kindergarten classes with a total of 44 students in Chézard-Saint-Martin. In the same year, there were 7 primary classes with a total of 135 students.

As of 2000, there were 7 students in Chézard-Saint-Martin who came from another municipality, while 183 residents attended schools outside the municipality.
