= Les Geneveys-sur-Coffrane =

- Former municipality
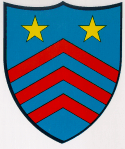
- Coat of arms
- Location of Les Geneveys-sur-Coffrane
- Location within Switzerland Location within Canton of Neuchâtel
- Coordinates: 47°1′N 6°51′E
- Country: Switzerland
- Canton: Neuchâtel
- District: Val-de-Ruz

Area
  - Total: 7.86 km^{2} (3.03 sq mi)
- Elevation: 862 m (2,828 ft)

Population (December 2011)
  - Total: 1,490
  - Density: 190/km^{2} (491/sq mi)
- Time zone: UTC+01:00 (CET)
  - Summer (DST): UTC+02:00 (CEST)
- Postal code: 2206
- SFOS number: 6480
- ISO 3166 code: CH-NE
- Surrounded by: Boudevilliers, Coffrane, La Sagne, Montmollin
- Website: www.lesgeneveys-sur-coffrane.ch

Les Geneveys-sur-Coffrane is a former municipality in the district of Val-de-Ruz in the canton of Neuchâtel in Switzerland.

The municipalities of Boudevilliers, Cernier, Chézard-Saint-Martin, Coffrane, Dombresson, Engollon, Fenin-Vilars-Saules, Fontainemelon, Fontaines, Les Geneveys-sur-Coffrane, Les Hauts-Geneveys, Montmollin, Le Pâquier, Savagnier and Villiers merged on 1 January 2013 into the new municipality of Val-de-Ruz.

== History ==
Les Geneveys-sur-Coffrane is first mentioned about 1342 as Geneveis sus Corfranoz.

== Geography ==
Aerial view from 1000 m by Walter Mittelholzer (1927)

Les Geneveys-sur-Coffrane had an area, as of 2009, of 7.9 square kilometers (3.1 mi^{2}). Of this area, 4.11 km^{2} (1.59 mi^{2}) or 52.3% is used for agricultural purposes, while 3.1 km^{2} (1.2 mi^{2}) or 39.4% is forested. Of the rest of the land, 0.64 km^{2} (0.25 mi^{2}) or 8.1% is settled (buildings or roads).

Of the built up area, housing and buildings made up 4.1% and transportation infrastructure made up 2.3%. Out of the forested land, 36.0% of the total land area is heavily forested and 3.4% is covered with orchards or small clusters of trees. Of the agricultural land, 13.9% is used for growing crops and 13.4% is pastures and 24.9% is used for alpine pastures.

The former municipality is located in the Val-de-Ruz district, at the foot of the 1,439 m (4,721 ft) high Mont Racine and along the SBB-CFF-FFS Neuchâtel to La Chaux-de-Fonds rail line.

== Coat of arms ==
The blazon of the municipal coat of arms is Azure, three Chevronelles Gules and in chief two Mullets of Five Or.

== Demographics ==
Les Geneveys-sur-Coffrane had a population (as of 2011) of 1,490. As of 2008, 24.9% of the population are resident foreign nationals. Over the last 10 years (2000–2010) the population has changed at a rate of 8.2%. It has changed at a rate of 4.8% due to migration and at a rate of 4.7% due to births and deaths.

Most of the population (as of 2000) speaks French (1,147 or 81.4%) as their first language, Portuguese is the second most common (95 or 6.7%) and Italian is the third (45 or 3.2%). There are 37 people who speak German and 4 people who speak Romansh.

As of 2008, the population was 50.8% male and 49.2% female. The population was made up of 539 Swiss men (36.6% of the population) and 210 (14.3%) non-Swiss men. There were 572 Swiss women (38.8%) and 152 (10.3%) non-Swiss women. Of the population in the municipality, 286 or about 20.3% were born in Les Geneveys-sur-Coffrane and lived there in 2000. There were 419 or 29.7% who were born in the same canton, while 252 or 17.9% were born somewhere else in Switzerland, and 412 or 29.2% were born outside of Switzerland.

As of 2000, children and teenagers (0–19 years old) make up 24.1% of the population, while adults (20–64 years old) make up 63.7% and seniors (over 64 years old) make up 12.3%.

As of 2000, there were 556 people who were single and never married in the municipality. There were 702 married individuals, 75 widows or widowers and 76 individuals who are divorced.

As of 2000, there were 558 private households in the municipality, and an average of 2.4 persons per household. There were 163 households that consist of only one person and 43 households with five or more people. In 2000, a total of 554 apartments (92.2% of the total) were permanently occupied, while 29 apartments (4.8%) were seasonally occupied and 18 apartments (3.0%) were empty. As of 2009, the construction rate of new housing units was 0.7 new units per 1000 residents. The vacancy rate for the municipality, in 2010, was 1.5%.

The historical population is given in the following chart:

== Politics ==
In the 2007 federal election the most popular party was the SVP which received 24.72% of the vote. The next three most popular parties were the SP (24.63%), the FDP (16.58%) and the LPS Party (14.93%). In the federal election, a total of 475 votes were cast, and the voter turnout was 52.4%.

== Economy ==
As of 2010, Les Geneveys-sur-Coffrane had an unemployment rate of 5.3%. As of 2008, there were 16 people employed in the primary economic sector and about 7 businesses involved in this sector. 775 people were employed in the secondary sector and there were 17 businesses in this sector. 132 people were employed in the tertiary sector, with 33 businesses in this sector. There were 748 residents of the municipality who were employed in some capacity, of which females made up 42.4% of the workforce.

In 2008 the total number of full-time equivalent jobs was 864. The number of jobs in the primary sector was 12, all of which were in agriculture. The number of jobs in the secondary sector was 754 of which 498 or (66.0%) were in manufacturing and 256 (34.0%) were in construction. The number of jobs in the tertiary sector was 98. In the tertiary sector; 27 or 27.6% were in wholesale or retail sales or the repair of motor vehicles, 7 or 7.1% were in the movement and storage of goods, 18 or 18.4% were in a hotel or restaurant, 3 or 3.1% were in the information industry, 4 or 4.1% were technical professionals or scientists, 9 or 9.2% were in education and 14 or 14.3% were in health care.

In 2000, there were 542 workers who commuted into the municipality and 459 workers who commuted away. The municipality is a net importer of workers, with about 1.2 workers entering the municipality for every one leaving. About 6.1% of the workforce coming into Les Geneveys-sur-Coffrane are coming from outside Switzerland. Of the working population, 15.1% used public transportation to get to work, and 55.5% used a private car.

== Religion ==
From the 2000 census, 408 or 29.0% were Roman Catholic, while 482 or 34.2% belonged to the Swiss Reformed Church. Of the rest of the population, there were 10 members of an Orthodox church (or about 0.71% of the population), there were 2 individuals (or about 0.14% of the population) who belonged to the Christian Catholic Church, and there were 92 individuals (or about 6.53% of the population) who belonged to another Christian church. There were 68 (or about 4.83% of the population) who were Islamic. There was 1 person who was Buddhist and 4 individuals who belonged to another church. 327 (or about 23.21% of the population) belonged to no church, are agnostic or atheist, and 61 individuals (or about 4.33% of the population) did not answer the question.

== Education ==
In Les Geneveys-sur-Coffrane about 481 or (34.1%) of the population have completed non-mandatory upper secondary education, and 149 or (10.6%) have completed additional higher education (either university or a Fachhochschule). Of the 149 who completed tertiary schooling, 51.7% were Swiss men, 29.5% were Swiss women, 10.7% were non-Swiss men and 8.1% were non-Swiss women.

In the canton of Neuchâtel most municipalities provide two years of non-mandatory kindergarten, followed by five years of mandatory primary education. The next four years of mandatory secondary education is provided at thirteen larger secondary schools, which many students travel out of their home municipality to attend. The kindergarten is combined with Montmollin and Coffrane while the primary school is combined with Coffrane. During the 2010-11 school year, there were 3 kindergarten classes with a total of 43 students between the municipalities. In the same year, there were 7 primary classes with a total of 139 students.

As of 2000, there were 8 students in Les Geneveys-sur-Coffrane who came from another municipality, while 140 residents attended schools outside the municipality.
