= Coffrane =

- Former municipality
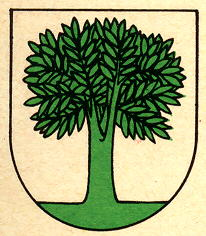
- Coat of arms
- Location of Coffrane
- Location within Switzerland Location within Canton of Neuchâtel
- Coordinates: 47°1′N 6°52′E
- Country: Switzerland
- Canton: Neuchâtel
- District: Val-de-Ruz

Area
  - Total: 6.49 km^{2} (2.51 sq mi)
- Elevation: 803 m (2,635 ft)

Population (December 2011)
  - Total: 695
  - Density: 107/km^{2} (277/sq mi)
- Time zone: UTC+01:00 (CET)
  - Summer (DST): UTC+02:00 (CEST)
- Postal code: 2207
- SFOS number: 6474
- ISO 3166 code: CH-NE
- Surrounded by: Boudevilliers, Corcelles-Cormondrèche, La Sagne, Les Geneveys-sur-Coffrane, Montmollin, Peseux, Valangin
- Website: SFSO statistics

Coffrane is a former municipality in the district of Val-de-Ruz in the canton of Neuchâtel in Switzerland.

The municipalities of Boudevilliers, Cernier, Chézard-Saint-Martin, Coffrane, Dombresson, Engollon, Fenin-Vilars-Saules, Fontainemelon, Fontaines, Les Geneveys-sur-Coffrane, Les Hauts-Geneveys, Montmollin, Le Pâquier, Savagnier and Villiers merged on 1 January 2013 into the new municipality of Val-de-Ruz.

== History ==
Coffrane is first mentioned in 1092 as de Cusfrano.

Coffrane is also the site of the Battle of Coffrane, 1296.

== Geography ==
Aerial view from 1500 m by Walter Mittelholzer (1926)

Coffrane had an area, as of 2009, of 6.5 square kilometers (2.5 mi^{2}). Of this area, 4.11 km^{2} (1.59 mi^{2}) or 63.3% is used for agricultural purposes, while 1.71 km^{2} (0.66 mi^{2}) or 26.3% is forested. Of the rest of the land, 0.68 km^{2} (0.26 mi^{2}) or 10.5% is settled (buildings or roads), 0.02 km^{2} (4.9 acres) or 0.3% is either rivers or lakes and 0.02 km^{2} (4.9 acres) or 0.3% is unproductive land.

Of the built up area, industrial buildings made up 1.2% of the total area while housing and buildings made up 3.2% and transportation infrastructure made up 2.0%. Power and water infrastructure as well as other special developed areas made up 3.5% of the area Out of the forested land, 25.0% of the total land area is heavily forested and 1.4% is covered with orchards or small clusters of trees. Of the agricultural land, 32.4% is used for growing crops and 16.8% is pastures and 14.0% is used for alpine pastures. All the water in the municipality is flowing water.

The former municipality is located in the Val-de-Ruz district, on the road between Rochefort and Saint-Imier.

== Coat of arms ==
The blazon of the municipal coat of arms is Argent, from a base Vert issuant an Ash-tree proper.

== Demographics ==
Coffrane had a population (as of 2011) of 695. As of 2008, 12.9% of the population are resident foreign nationals. Over the last 10 years (2000–2010) the population has changed at a rate of 2%. It has changed at a rate of 0.6% due to migration and at a rate of 3.1% due to births and deaths.

Most of the population (as of 2000) speaks French (568 or 91.9%) as their first language, Italian is the second most common (15 or 2.4%) and German is the third (11 or 1.8%). There is 1 person who speaks Romansh.

As of 2008, the population was 50.6% male and 49.4% female. The population was made up of 297 Swiss men (43.9% of the population) and 45 (6.7%) non-Swiss men. There were 307 Swiss women (45.4%) and 27 (4.0%) non-Swiss women. Of the population in the municipality, 160 or about 25.9% were born in Coffrane and lived there in 2000. There were 219 or 35.4% who were born in the same canton, while 127 or 20.6% were born somewhere else in Switzerland, and 97 or 15.7% were born outside of Switzerland.

As of 2000, children and teenagers (0–19 years old) make up 29.8% of the population, while adults (20–64 years old) make up 56.8% and seniors (over 64 years old) make up 13.4%.

As of 2000, there were 261 people who were single and never married in the municipality. There were 296 married individuals, 31 widows or widowers and 30 individuals who are divorced.

As of 2000, there were 238 private households in the municipality, and an average of 2.6 persons per household. There were 71 households that consist of only one person and 21 households with five or more people. In 2000, a total of 236 apartments (90.8% of the total) were permanently occupied, while 19 apartments (7.3%) were seasonally occupied and 5 apartments (1.9%) were empty. As of 2009, the construction rate of new housing units was 6 new units per 1000 residents. The vacancy rate for the municipality, in 2010, was 1.75%.

The historical population is given in the following chart:

== Politics ==
In the 2007 federal election the most popular party was the SVP which received 23.68% of the vote. The next three most popular parties were the SP (22.5%), the LPS Party (16.3%) and the FDP (13.24%). In the federal election, a total of 247 votes were cast, and the voter turnout was 56.8%.

== Economy ==
As of 2010, Coffrane had an unemployment rate of 3.1%. As of 2008, there were 21 people employed in the primary economic sector and about 9 businesses involved in this sector. 10 people were employed in the secondary sector and there were 3 businesses in this sector. 47 people were employed in the tertiary sector, with 17 businesses in this sector. There were 303 residents of the municipality who were employed in some capacity, of which females made up 44.2% of the workforce.

In 2008 the total number of full-time equivalent jobs was 62. The number of jobs in the primary sector was 16, all of which were in agriculture. The number of jobs in the secondary sector was 9 of which 3 or (33.3%) were in manufacturing and 6 (66.7%) were in construction. The number of jobs in the tertiary sector was 37. In the tertiary sector; 5 or 13.5% were in wholesale or retail sales or the repair of motor vehicles, 5 or 13.5% were in the movement and storage of goods, 1 was in a hotel or restaurant, 1 was in the information industry, 9 or 24.3% were the insurance or financial industry, 4 or 10.8% were technical professionals or scientists, 10 or 27.0% were in education.

In 2000, there were 30 workers who commuted into the municipality and 232 workers who commuted away. The municipality is a net exporter of workers, with about 7.7 workers leaving the municipality for every one entering. Of the working population, 10.6% used public transportation to get to work, and 68.6% used a private car.

== Religion ==
From the 2000 census, 131 or 21.2% were Roman Catholic, while 316 or 51.1% belonged to the Swiss Reformed Church. Of the rest of the population, there were 2 members of an Orthodox church (or about 0.32% of the population), and there were 6 individuals (or about 0.97% of the population) who belonged to another Christian church. There were 29 (or about 4.69% of the population) who were Islamic. 109 (or about 17.64% of the population) belonged to no church, are agnostic or atheist, and 27 individuals (or about 4.37% of the population) did not answer the question.

== Education ==
In Coffrane about 232 or (37.5%) of the population have completed non-mandatory upper secondary education, and 67 or (10.8%) have completed additional higher education (either university or a Fachhochschule). Of the 67 who completed tertiary schooling, 64.2% were Swiss men, 23.9% were Swiss women, 7.5% were non-Swiss men.

In the canton of Neuchâtel most municipalities provide two years of non-mandatory kindergarten, followed by five years of mandatory primary education. The next four years of mandatory secondary education is provided at thirteen larger secondary schools, which many students travel out of their home municipality to attend. The kindergarten is combined with Les Geneveys-sur-Coffrane and Montmollin while the primary school is combined with Les Geneveys-sur-Coffrane. During the 2010-11 school year, there were 3 kindergarten classes with a total of 43 students between the municipalities. In the same year, there were 2 primary classes with a total of 37 students.

As of 2000, there was one student in Coffrane who came from another municipality, while 67 residents attended schools outside the municipality.
