= Val-de-Ruz District =

Coordinates: 47°03′40″N 6°54′05″E

Val-de-Ruz District District du Val-de-Ruz
- District
- Country: Switzerland
- Canton: Neuchâtel
- Capital: Cernier
- Dissolved: 1 January 2018

Area
  - Total: 128.02 km^{2} (49.43 sq mi)

Population (2017)
  - Total: 17,411
  - Density: 136.00/km^{2} (352.24/sq mi)
- Time zone: UTC+1 (CET)
  - Summer (DST): UTC+2 (CEST)
- Municipalities: 2

Val-de-Ruz District was one of the six districts of the canton of Neuchâtel, Switzerland, until the district level was eliminated on 1 January 2018. It consisted of the region of Val de Ruz and the surrounding Jura Mountains. The district capital was the town of Cernier. It had a population of 17,411.

== Municipalities ==
Val-de-Ruz comprised the following municipalities:

Coat of Arms	Municipality	Population (31 December 2020)	Area km^{2}
Valangin	Valangin	526	3.76
Val-de-Ruz	Val-de-Ruz	17,143	124.31
	Total	17,411	128.02

== Mergers and name changes ==
The municipalities of Boudevilliers, Cernier, Chézard-Saint-Martin, Coffrane, Dombresson, Engollon, Fenin-Vilars-Saules, Fontainemelon, Fontaines, Les Geneveys-sur-Coffrane, Les Hauts-Geneveys, Montmollin, Le Pâquier, Savagnier and Villiers merged on 1 January 2013 into the new municipality of Val-de-Ruz.

== Demographics ==
The Val-de-Ruz had a population (as of 2017) of 17,411.

Most of the population (as of 2000) speaks French (13,144 or 90.5%) as their first language, German is the second most common (451 or 3.1%) and Italian is the third (255 or 1.8%). There are 10 people who speak Romansh.

As of 2008, the population was 49.6% male and 50.4% female. The population was made up of 6,698 Swiss men (42.3% of the population) and 1,154 (7.3%) non-Swiss men. There were 7,069 Swiss women (44.7%) and 906 (5.7%) non-Swiss women.

Of the population in the district, 3,325 or about 22.9% were born in Val-de-Ruz and lived there in 2000. There were 5,449 or 37.5% who were born in the same canton, while 2,953 or 20.3% were born somewhere else in Switzerland, and 2,373 or 16.3% were born outside of Switzerland.

As of 2000, there were 6,000 people who were single and never married in the district. There were 7,024 married individuals, 713 widows or widowers and 791 individuals who are divorced.

There were 1,655 households that consist of only one person and 440 households with five or more people.

The historical population is given in the following chart:

== Politics ==
In the 2007 federal election the most popular party was the SP which received 24.22% of the vote. The next three most popular parties were the SVP (23.45%), the LPS Party (16.18%) and the FDP (14.75%). In the federal election, a total of 5,683 votes were cast, and the voter turnout was 54.8%.

== Religion ==
From the 2000 census, 3,447 or 23.7% were Roman Catholic, while 6,579 or 45.3% belonged to the Swiss Reformed Church. Of the rest of the population, there were 37 members of an Orthodox church (or about 0.25% of the population), there were 22 individuals (or about 0.15% of the population) who belonged to the Christian Catholic Church, and there were 813 individuals (or about 5.60% of the population) who belonged to another Christian church. There were 8 individuals (or about 0.06% of the population) who were Jewish, and 318 (or about 2.19% of the population) who were Islamic. There were 19 individuals who were Buddhist and 26 individuals who belonged to another church. 3,077 (or about 21.18% of the population) belonged to no church, are agnostic or atheist, and 577 individuals (or about 3.97% of the population) did not answer the question.

== Education ==
In Val-de-Ruz about 5,347 or (36.8%) of the population have completed non-mandatory upper secondary education, and 1,948 or (13.4%) have completed additional higher education (either university or a Fachhochschule). Of the 1,948 who completed tertiary schooling, 55.3% were Swiss men, 29.5% were Swiss women, 9.5% were non-Swiss men and 5.7% were non-Swiss women.

In the canton of Neuchâtel most municipalities provide two years of non-mandatory kindergarten, followed by five years of mandatory primary education. The next four years of mandatory secondary education is provided at thirteen larger secondary schools, which many students travel out of their home municipality to attend. During the 2010-11 school year, there were 20 kindergarten classes with a total of 354 students in District du Val-de-Ruz. In the same year, there were 59 primary classes with a total of 1,089 students.
