= Boudevilliers =

- Former municipality
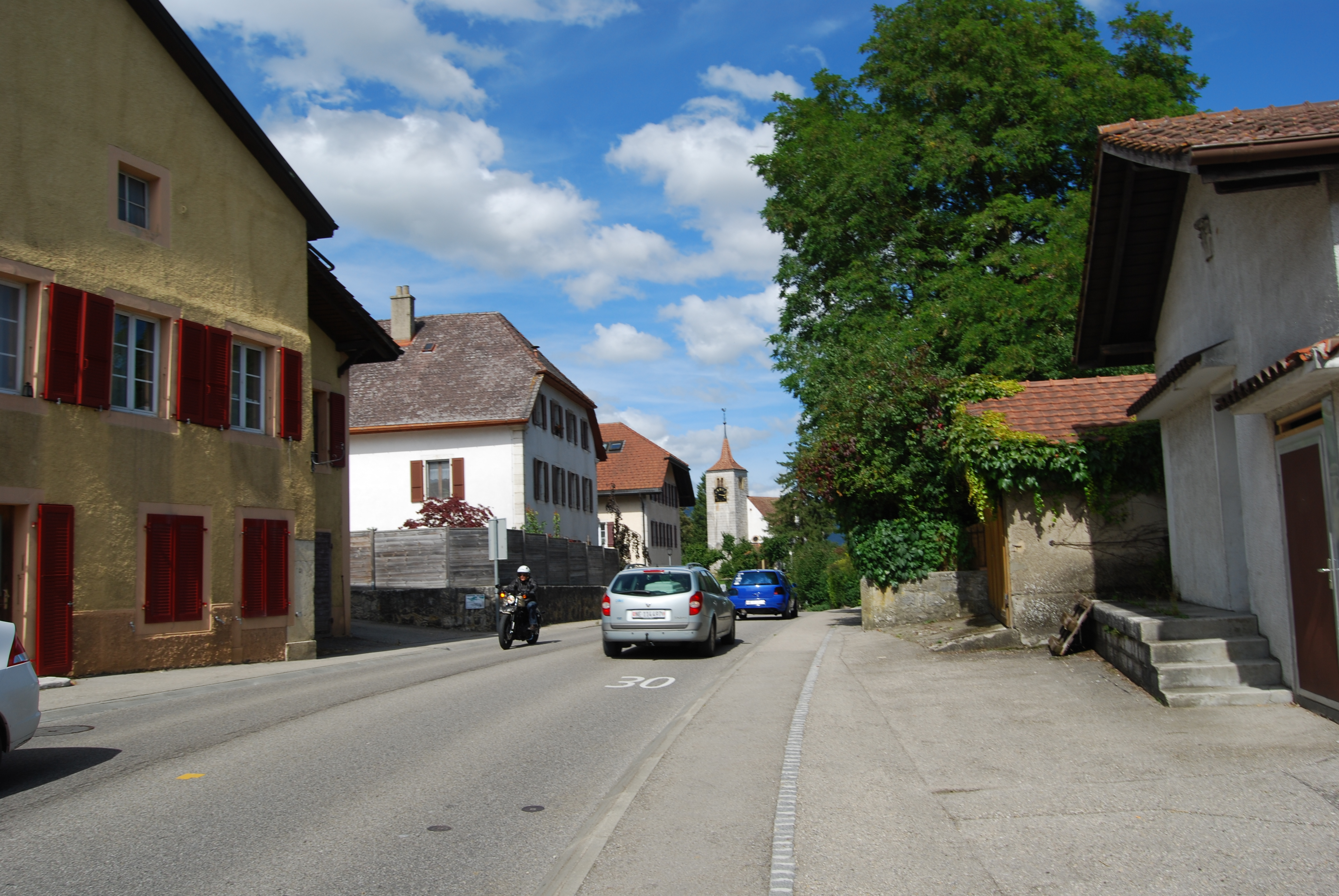

- Flag Coat of arms
- Location of Boudevilliers
- Location within Switzerland Location within Canton of Neuchâtel
- Coordinates: 47°02′N 6°53′E
- Country: Switzerland
- Canton: Neuchâtel
- District: Val-de-Ruz

Area
  - Total: 12.57 km^{2} (4.85 sq mi)
- Elevation: 753 m (2,470 ft)

Population (December 2011)
  - Total: 754
  - Density: 60.0/km^{2} (155/sq mi)
- Time zone: UTC+01:00 (CET)
  - Summer (DST): UTC+02:00 (CEST)
- Postal code: 2043
- SFOS number: 6471
- ISO 3166 code: CH-NE
- Surrounded by: Coffrane, Fontaines, La Sagne, Les Geneveys-sur-Coffrane, Les Hauts-Geneveys, Valangin
- Website: boudevilliers.ne.ch

Boudevilliers is a former municipality in the district of Val-de-Ruz in the canton of Neuchâtel in Switzerland. The municipalities of Boudevilliers, Cernier, Chézard-Saint-Martin, Coffrane, Dombresson, Engollon, Fenin-Vilars-Saules, Fontainemelon, Fontaines, Les Geneveys-sur-Coffrane, Les Hauts-Geneveys, Montmollin, Le Pâquier, Savagnier and Villiers merged on 1 January 2013 into the new municipality of Val-de-Ruz.

== History ==
Boudevilliers is first mentioned in 1195 as Boudeviler.

== Geography ==
Boudevilliers had an area, as of 2009, of 12.6 square kilometers (4.9 mi^{2}). Of this area, 7.71 km^{2} (2.98 mi^{2}) or 61.3% is used for agricultural purposes, while 4.05 km^{2} (1.56 mi^{2}) or 32.2% is forested. Of the rest of the land, 0.79 km^{2} (0.31 mi^{2}) or 6.3% is settled (buildings or roads), 0.02 km^{2} (4.9 acres) or 0.2% is either rivers or lakes and 0.02 km^{2} (4.9 acres) or 0.2% is unproductive land.

Of the built up area, housing and buildings made up 2.2% and transportation infrastructure made up 3.3%. Out of the forested land, 28.9% of the total land area is heavily forested and 3.3% is covered with orchards or small clusters of trees. Of the agricultural land, 38.7% is used for growing crops and 10.3% is pastures and 11.9% is used for alpine pastures. All the water in the municipality is flowing water.

The former municipality is located in the Val-de-Ruz district, at the intersection of the Neuchâtel to La Chaux-de-Fonds and the Rochefort to Saint-Imier roads. It consists of the village of Boudevilliers and the hamlets of Malvilliers, La Jonchère and Landeyeux.

== Coat of arms ==
The blazon of the municipal coat of arms is Gules, a Cross bottony Or.

== Demographics ==
Boudevilliers had a population (as of 2011) of 754. As of 2008, 12.7% of the population are resident foreign nationals. Over the last 10 years (2000–2010) the population has changed at a rate of 20%. It has changed at a rate of 8.5% due to migration and at a rate of 11.7% due to births and deaths.

Most of the population (as of 2000) speaks French (665 or 92.6%) as their first language, German is the second most common (22 or 3.1%) and Portuguese is the third (8 or 1.1%). There are 5 people who speak Italian.

As of 2008, the population was 48.5% male and 51.5% female. The population was made up of 337 Swiss men (42.9% of the population) and 44 (5.6%) non-Swiss men. There were 368 Swiss women (46.8%) and 37 (4.7%) non-Swiss women. Of the population in the municipality, 159 or about 22.1% were born in Boudevilliers and lived there in 2000. There were 300 or 41.8% who were born in the same canton, while 141 or 19.6% were born somewhere else in Switzerland, and 99 or 13.8% were born outside of Switzerland.

As of 2000, children and teenagers (0–19 years old) make up 26.5% of the population, while adults (20–64 years old) make up 57% and seniors (over 64 years old) make up 16.6%.

As of 2000, there were 301 people who were single and never married in the municipality. There were 329 married individuals, 59 widows or widowers and 29 individuals who are divorced.

As of 2000, there were 252 private households in the municipality, and an average of 2.5 persons per household. There were 64 households that consist of only one person and 23 households with five or more people. In 2000, a total of 232 apartments (89.6% of the total) were permanently occupied, while 17 apartments (6.6%) were seasonally occupied and 10 apartments (3.9%) were empty. The vacancy rate for the municipality, in 2010, was 0.68%.

The historical population is given in the following chart:

== Sights ==
Boudevilliers is known for its ancient chateau which dates from the Middle Ages.

== Politics ==
In the 2007 federal election the most popular party was the SP which received 25.43% of the vote. The next three most popular parties were the FDP (19.97%), the SVP (19.9%) and the LPS Party (13.99%). In the federal election, a total of 276 votes were cast, and the voter turnout was 55.9%.

== Economy ==
As of 2010, Boudevilliers had an unemployment rate of 3.1%. As of 2008, there were 43 people employed in the primary economic sector and about 17 businesses involved in this sector. 62 people were employed in the secondary sector and there were 10 businesses in this sector. 404 people were employed in the tertiary sector, with 32 businesses in this sector. There were 372 residents of the municipality who were employed in some capacity, of which females made up 42.5% of the workforce.

In 2008 the total number of full-time equivalent jobs was 413. The number of jobs in the primary sector was 28, of which 27 were in agriculture and 1 was in forestry or lumber production. The number of jobs in the secondary sector was 58 of which 6 or (10.3%) were in manufacturing and 53 (91.4%) were in construction. The number of jobs in the tertiary sector was 327. In the tertiary sector; 33 or 10.1% were in wholesale or retail sales or the repair of motor vehicles, 20 or 6.1% were in a hotel or restaurant, 6 or 1.8% were in the information industry, 2 or 0.6% were the insurance or financial industry, 9 or 2.8% were technical professionals or scientists, 1 was in education and 216 or 66.1% were in health care.

In 2000, there were 326 workers who commuted into the municipality and 243 workers who commuted away. The municipality is a net importer of workers, with about 1.3 workers entering the municipality for every one leaving. About 3.1% of the workforce coming into Boudevilliers are coming from outside Switzerland. Of the working population, 7% used public transportation to get to work, and 65.6% used a private car.

== Religion ==
From the 2000 census, 153 or 21.3% were Roman Catholic, while 350 or 48.7% belonged to the Swiss Reformed Church. Of the rest of the population, there were 3 members of an Orthodox church (or about 0.42% of the population), and there were 20 individuals (or about 2.79% of the population) who belonged to another Christian church. There were 15 (or about 2.09% of the population) who were Islamic. There were 2 individuals who were Buddhist. 158 (or about 22.01% of the population) belonged to no church, are agnostic or atheist, and 27 individuals (or about 3.76% of the population) did not answer the question.

== Weather ==
Boudevilliers has an average of 134.1 days of rain or snow per year and on average receives 1,165 mm (45.9 in) of precipitation. The wettest month is December during which time Boudevilliers receives an average of 116 mm (4.6 in) of rain or snow. During this month there is precipitation for an average of 12.9 days. The month with the most days of precipitation is May, with an average of 13.1, but with only 93 mm (3.7 in) of rain or snow. The driest month of the year is April with an average of 78 mm (3.1 in) of precipitation over 11.2 days.

== Education ==
In Boudevilliers about 277 or (38.6%) of the population have completed non-mandatory upper secondary education, and 112 or (15.6%) have completed additional higher education (either university or a Fachhochschule). Of the 112 who completed tertiary schooling, 49.1% were Swiss men, 30.4% were Swiss women, 12.5% were non-Swiss men and 8.0% were non-Swiss women.

In the canton of Neuchâtel most municipalities provide two years of non-mandatory kindergarten, followed by five years of mandatory primary education. The next four years of mandatory secondary education is provided at thirteen larger secondary schools, which many students travel out of their home municipality to attend. During the 2010-11 school year, there were 0.5 kindergarten classes with a total of 10 students in Boudevilliers. In the same year, there was one primary class with a total of 20 students.

As of 2000, there were 25 students in Boudevilliers who came from another municipality, while 99 residents attended schools outside the municipality.
