= Engollon =

- Former municipality
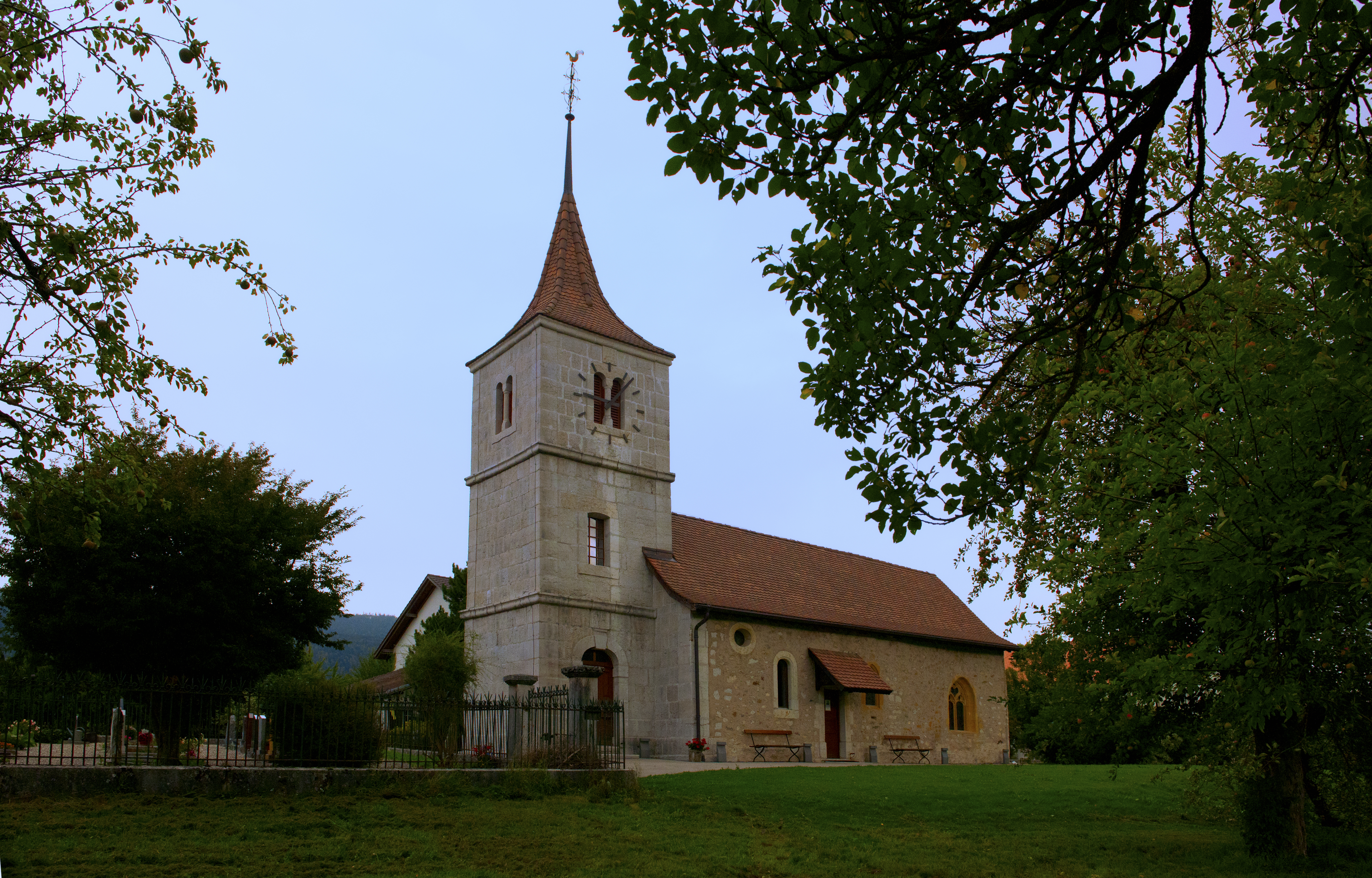
- Engollon village church

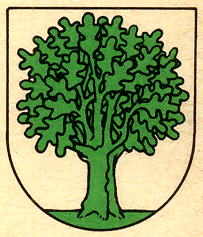
- Coat of arms
- Location of Engollon
- Location within Switzerland Location within Canton of Neuchâtel
- Coordinates: 47°2′N 6°55′E
- Country: Switzerland
- Canton: Neuchâtel
- District: Val-de-Ruz

Area
  - Total: 2.62 km^{2} (1.01 sq mi)
- Elevation: 727 m (2,385 ft)

Population (December 2011)
  - Total: 97
  - Density: 37/km^{2} (96/sq mi)
- Time zone: UTC+01:00 (CET)
  - Summer (DST): UTC+02:00 (CEST)
- Postal code: 2063
- SFOS number: 6476
- ISO 3166 code: CH-NE
- Surrounded by: Cernier, Chézard-Saint-Martin, Fenin-Vilars-Saules, Fontaines, Savagnier, Valangin
- Website: SFSO statistics

Engollon is a former municipality in the district of Val-de-Ruz in the canton of Neuchâtel in Switzerland.

The municipalities of Boudevilliers, Cernier, Chézard-Saint-Martin, Coffrane, Dombresson, Engollon, Fenin-Vilars-Saules, Fontainemelon, Fontaines, Les Geneveys-sur-Coffrane, Les Hauts-Geneveys, Montmollin, Le Pâquier, Savagnier and Villiers merged on 1 January 2013 into the new municipality of Val-de-Ruz.

== History ==
Engollon is first mentioned in 1228 as Engolun.

== Geography ==
Aerial view from 1500 m by Walter Mittelholzer (1927)

Engollon had an area, as of 2009, of 2.6 square kilometers (1.0 mi^{2}). Of this area, 2.14 km^{2} (0.83 mi^{2}) or 81.7% is used for agricultural purposes, while 0.27 km^{2} (0.10 mi^{2}) or 10.3% is forested. Of the rest of the land, 0.16 km^{2} (0.062 mi^{2}) or 6.1% is settled (buildings or roads), 0.05 km^{2} (12 acres) or 1.9% is either rivers or lakes.

Of the built up area, housing and buildings made up 1.9% and transportation infrastructure made up 3.1%. Out of the forested land, 8.8% of the total land area is heavily forested and 1.5% is covered with orchards or small clusters of trees. Of the agricultural land, 69.1% is used for growing crops and 11.5% is pastures, while 1.1% is used for orchards or vine crops. All the water in the municipality is flowing water.

The former municipality is located in the Val-de-Ruz district, on the banks of the Seyon.

== Coat of arms ==
The blazon of the municipal coat of arms is Argent, from a base Vert issuant an Oak-tree of the same.

== Demographics ==
Engollon had a population (as of 2011) of 97. As of 2008, 3.8% of the population are resident foreign nationals. Over the last 10 years (2000–2010) the population has changed at a rate of 40.5%. It has changed at a rate of 36.5% due to migration and at a rate of 2.7% due to births and deaths.

Most of the population (as of 2000) speaks French (71 or 95.9%) as their first language with the rest speaking German

As of 2008, the population was 47.5% male and 52.5% female. The population was made up of 47 Swiss men (47.5% of the population) and (0.0%) non-Swiss men. There were 49 Swiss women (49.5%) and 3 (3.0%) non-Swiss women. Of the population in the municipality, 25 or about 33.8% were born in Engollon and lived there in 2000. There were 34 or 45.9% who were born in the same canton, while 10 or 13.5% were born somewhere else in Switzerland, and 3 or 4.1% were born outside of Switzerland.

As of 2000, children and teenagers (0–19 years old) make up 17.6% of the population, while adults (20–64 years old) make up 62.2% and seniors (over 64 years old) make up 20.3%.

As of 2000, there were 30 people who were single and never married in the municipality. There were 33 married individuals, 5 widows or widowers and 6 individuals who are divorced.

As of 2000, there were 31 private households in the municipality, and an average of 2.1 persons per household. There were 11 households that consist of only one person and households with five or more people. In 2000, a total of 30 apartments (88.2% of the total) were permanently occupied and 4 apartments (11.8%) were empty.

The historical population is given in the following chart:

== Heritage sites of national significance ==
The Engollon Church and the abandoned village of La Bonneville are listed as Swiss heritage site of national significance.

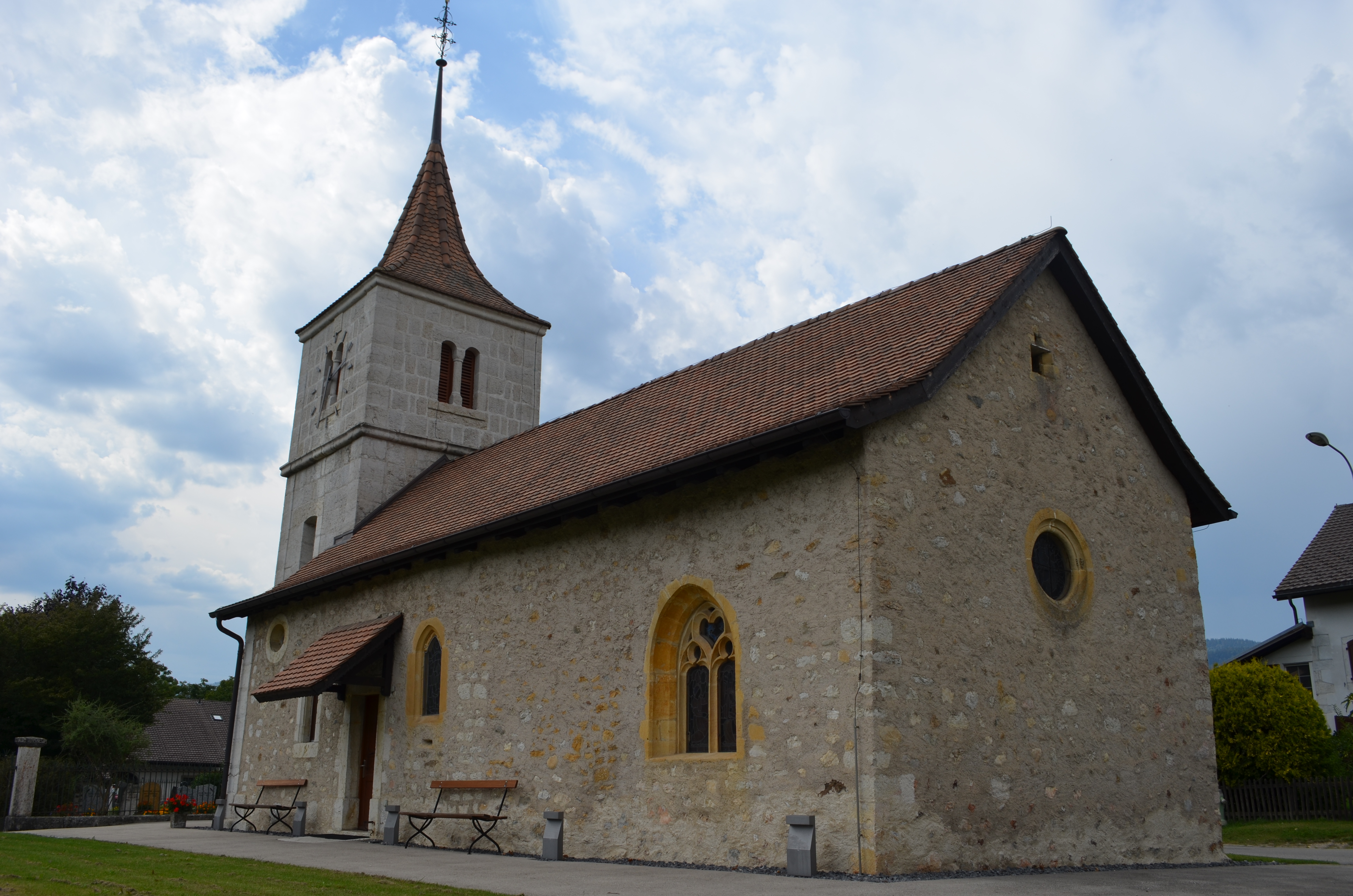
Engollon Church

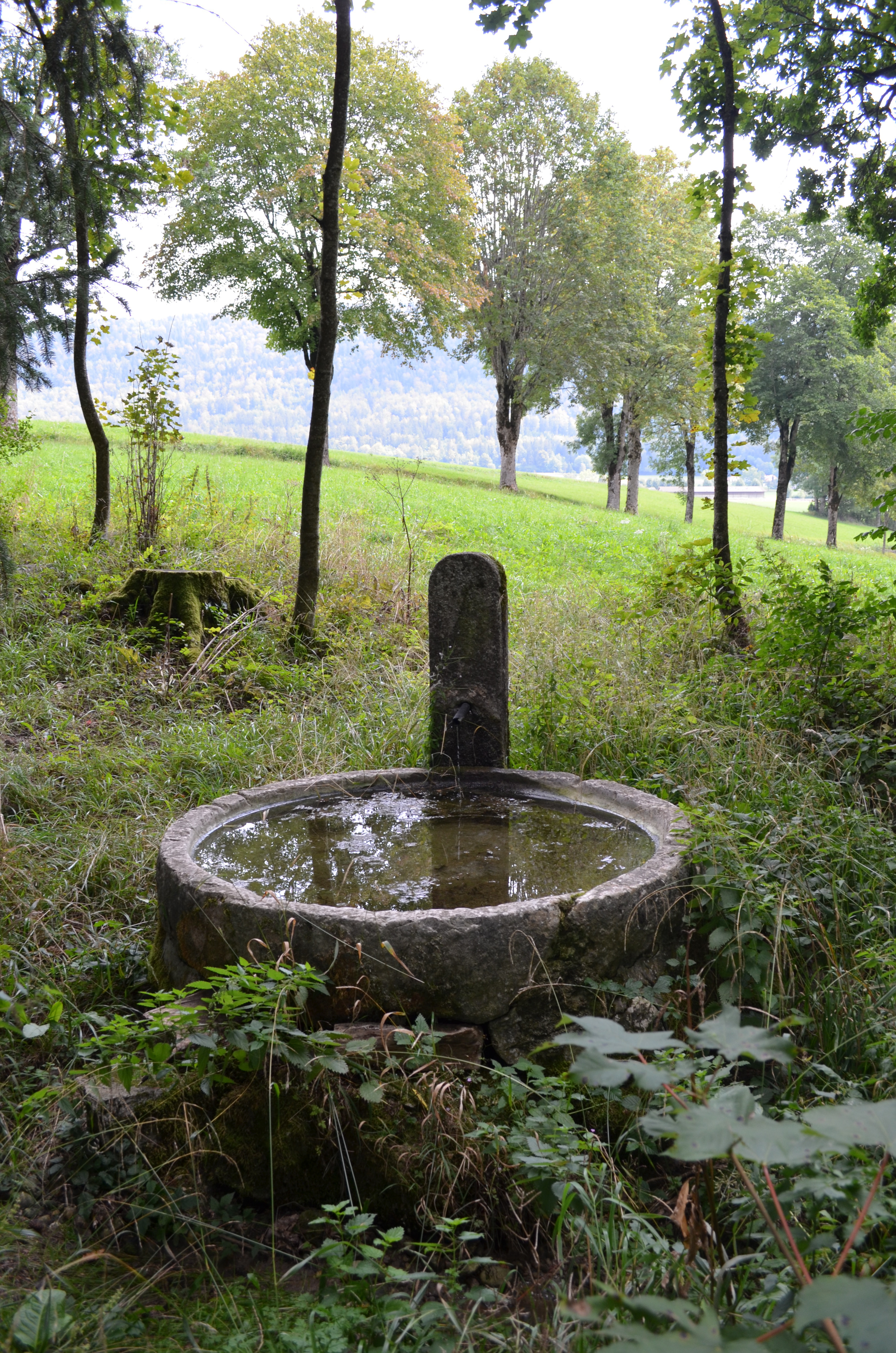
Fountain of Bonneville, all that remains of the village which was destroyed in 1301

== Politics ==
In the 2007 federal election the most popular party was the FDP which received 26.44% of the vote. The next three most popular parties were the LPS Party (23.37%), the SP (18.01%) and the SVP (9.96%). In the federal election, a total of 53 votes were cast, and the voter turnout was 69.7%.

== Economy ==
As of 2010, Engollon had an unemployment rate of 3.2%. As of 2008, there were 8 people employed in the primary economic sector and about 4 businesses involved in this sector. 13 people were employed in the secondary sector and there were 4 businesses in this sector. 6 people were employed in the tertiary sector, with 3 businesses in this sector. There were 45 residents of the municipality who were employed in some capacity, of which females made up 42.2% of the workforce.

In 2008 the total number of full-time equivalent jobs was 22. The number of jobs in the primary sector was 6, all of which were in agriculture. The number of jobs in the secondary sector was 11 of which 2 or (18.2%) were in manufacturing and 7 (63.6%) were in construction. The number of jobs in the tertiary sector was 5, of which 4 were in a hotel or restaurant and 1 was a technical professional or scientist.

In 2000, there were 12 workers who commuted into the municipality and 24 workers who commuted away. The municipality is a net exporter of workers, with about 2.0 workers leaving the municipality for every one entering. Of the working population, 4.4% used public transportation to get to work, and 55.6% used a private car.

== Religion ==
From the 2000 census, 7 or 9.5% were Roman Catholic, while 53 or 71.6% belonged to the Swiss Reformed Church. Of the rest of the population, there were 10 individuals (or about 13.51% of the population) who belonged to another Christian church. 8 (or about 10.81% of the population) belonged to no church, are agnostic or atheist, and 1 individual (or about 1.35% of the population) did not answer the question.

== Education ==
In Engollon about 37 or (50.0%) of the population have completed non-mandatory upper secondary education, and 16 or (21.6%) have completed additional higher education (either university or a Fachhochschule). Of the 16 who completed tertiary schooling, 68.8% were Swiss men, 18.8% were Swiss women.

In the canton of Neuchâtel most municipalities provide two years of non-mandatory kindergarten, followed by five years of mandatory primary education. The next four years of mandatory secondary education is provided at thirteen larger secondary schools, which many students travel out of their home municipality to attend. Both the kindergarten and the primary school are combined with Fenin-Vilars-Saules. During the 2010-11 school year, there was one kindergarten class with a total of 23 students between the municipalities. In the same year, there were 3 primary classes with a total of 56 students.

As of 2000, there were 7 students from Engollon who attended schools outside the municipality.
