= Montmollin =

- Former municipality
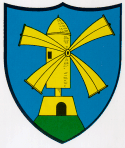
- Coat of arms
- Location of Montmollin
- Location within Switzerland Location within Canton of Neuchâtel
- Coordinates: 47°0′N 6°51′E
- Country: Switzerland
- Canton: Neuchâtel
- District: Val-de-Ruz

Area
  - Total: 4.06 km^{2} (1.57 sq mi)
- Elevation: 772 m (2,533 ft)

Population (December 2011)
  - Total: 568
  - Density: 140/km^{2} (362/sq mi)
- Time zone: UTC+01:00 (CET)
  - Summer (DST): UTC+02:00 (CEST)
- Postal code: 2037
- SFOS number: 6482
- ISO 3166 code: CH-NE
- Surrounded by: Brot-Plamboz, Coffrane, Corcelles-Cormondrèche, La Sagne, Les Geneveys-sur-Coffrane, Rochefort
- Website: SFSO statistics

Montmollin is a former municipality in the district of Val-de-Ruz in the canton of Neuchâtel in Switzerland.

The municipalities of Boudevilliers, Cernier, Chézard-Saint-Martin, Coffrane, Dombresson, Engollon, Fenin-Vilars-Saules, Fontainemelon, Fontaines, Les Geneveys-sur-Coffrane, Les Hauts-Geneveys, Montmollin, Le Pâquier, Savagnier and Villiers merged on 1 January 2013 into the new municipality of Val-de-Ruz.

== History ==
Montmollin is first mentioned in 1347 as Mommolens. In 1372, it was mentioned as Montmolens.

== Geography ==
Aerial view from 1000 m by Walter Mittelholzer (1927)

Montmollin had an area, as of 2009, of 4.1 square kilometers (1.6 mi^{2}). Of this area, 2.33 km^{2} (0.90 mi^{2}) or 57.4% is used for agricultural purposes, while 1.45 km^{2} (0.56 mi^{2}) or 35.7% is forested. Of the rest of the land, 0.24 km^{2} (0.093 mi^{2}) or 5.9% is settled (buildings or roads) and 0.01 km^{2} (2.5 acres) or 0.2% is unproductive land.

Of the built-up area, housing and buildings made up 3.7% and transportation infrastructure made up 1.5%. Out of the forested land, 33.5% of the total land area is heavily forested and 2.2% is covered with orchards or small clusters of trees. Of the agricultural land, 19.7% is used for growing crops, 19.5% is pastures and 18.2% is used for alpine pastures.

The former municipality is located in the Val-de-Ruz district, on the westernmost edge of the valley.

== Coat of arms ==
The blazon of the municipal coat of arms is Azure, on a Mount Vert a Mill Or.

== Demographics ==
Montmollin had a population (as of 2011) of 568. As of 2008, 14.4% of the population are resident foreign nationals. Over the last 10 years (2000–2010), the population has changed at a rate of 14%. It has changed at a rate of 5.2% due to migration and at a rate of 11.7% due to births and deaths.

Most of the population (as of 2000) speaks French (427 or 90.3%) as their first language, German is the second most common (19 or 4.0%) and English is the third (8 or 1.7%). There are 5 people who speak Italian.

As of 2008, the population was 52.5% male and 47.5% female. The population was made up of 236 Swiss men (43.1% of the population) and 51 (9.3%) non-Swiss men. There were 222 Swiss women (40.6%) and 38 (6.9%) non-Swiss women. Of the population in the municipality, 101 or about 21.4% were born in Montmollin and lived there in 2000. There were 171 or 36.2% who were born in the same canton, while 95 or 20.1% were born somewhere else in Switzerland, and 92 or 19.5% were born outside of Switzerland.

As of 2000, children and teenagers (0–19 years old) make up 22.8% of the population, while adults (20–64 years old) make up 65.3% and seniors (over 64 years old) make up 11.8%.

As of 2000, there were 184 people who were single and never married in the municipality. There were 236 married individuals, 17 widows or widowers and 36 individuals who are divorced.

As of 2000, there were 201 private households in the municipality and an average of 2.3 persons per household. There were 60 households that consisted of only one person and 8 households with five or more people. In 2000, a total of 198 apartments (83.5% of the total) were permanently occupied, while 30 apartments (12.7%) were seasonally occupied and 9 apartments (3.8%) were empty. As of 2009, the construction rate of new housing units was 1.8 new units per 1000 residents.

The historical population is given in the following chart:

== Politics ==
In the 2007 federal election, the most popular party was the SVP, which received 29.4% of the vote. The next three most popular parties were the SP (14.97%), the LPS Party (14.75%) and the FDP (12.13%). In the federal election, a total of 189 votes were cast, and the voter turnout was 53.1%.

== Economy ==
As of 2010, Montmollin had an unemployment rate of 5.2%. As of 2008, there were 14 people employed in the primary economic sector and about 4 businesses involved in this sector. 10 people were employed in the secondary sector and there were 3 businesses in this sector. 50 people were employed in the tertiary sector, with 14 businesses in this sector. There were 274 residents of the municipality who were employed in some capacity, of which females made up 45.6% of the workforce.

In 2008, the total number of full-time equivalent jobs was 67. The number of jobs in the primary sector was 11, all of which were in agriculture. The number of jobs in the secondary sector was 10, of which 2 or (20.0%) were in manufacturing and 7 (70.0%) were in construction. The number of jobs in the tertiary sector was 46. In the tertiary sector; 17 or 37.0% were in wholesale or retail sales or the repair of motor vehicles, 2 or 4.3% were in the movement and storage of goods, 13 or 28.3% were in a hotel or restaurant, 2 or 4.3% were in the information industry, 2 or 4.3% were technical professionals or scientists, 5 or 10.9% were in education.

In 2000, there were 37 workers who commuted into the municipality and 231 workers who commuted away. The municipality is a net exporter of workers, with about 6.2 workers leaving the municipality for every one entering. Of the working population, 8.4% used public transportation to get to work, and 75.9% used a private car.

== Religion ==
From the 2000 census, 122 or 25.8% were Roman Catholic, while 186 or 39.3% belonged to the Swiss Reformed Church. Of the rest of the population, there was 1 individual who belonged to the Christian Catholic Church, and there were 15 individuals (or about 3.17% of the population) who belonged to another Christian church. There were 2 (or about 0.42% of the population) who were Islamic. There were 1 individual who belonged to another church. 138 (or about 29.18% of the population) belonged to no church, are agnostic or atheist, and 15 individuals (or about 3.17% of the population) did not answer the question.

== Education ==
In Montmollin, about 187 or (39.5%) of the population have completed non-mandatory upper secondary education, and 93 or (19.7%) have completed additional higher education (either university or a Fachhochschule). Of the 93 who completed tertiary schooling, 51.6% were Swiss men, 24.7% were Swiss women, 16.1% were non-Swiss men and 7.5% were non-Swiss women.

In the canton of Neuchâtel, most municipalities provide two years of non-mandatory kindergarten, followed by five years of mandatory primary education. The next four years of mandatory secondary education are provided at thirteen larger secondary schools, which many students travel out of their home municipality to attend. The kindergarten in Montmollin is combined with Coffrane and Les Geneveys-sur-Coffrane. During the 2010–11 school year, there were 3 kindergarten classes with a total of 43 students between the municipalities. In the same year, there were 3 primary classes with a total of 47 students.

As of 2000, there were 17 students in Montmollin who came from another municipality, while 46 residents attended schools outside the municipality.
