= Fontaines, Switzerland =

Fontaines
- Former municipality
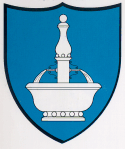
- Coat of arms
- Location of Fontaines
- Location within Switzerland Location within Canton of Neuchâtel
- Coordinates: 47°2.5′N 6°54′E
- Country: Switzerland
- Canton: Neuchâtel
- District: Val-de-Ruz

Area
  - Total: 10.14 km^{2} (3.92 sq mi)
- Elevation: 768 m (2,520 ft)

Population (December 2011)
  - Total: 1,132
  - Density: 111.6/km^{2} (289.1/sq mi)
- Time zone: UTC+01:00 (CET)
  - Summer (DST): UTC+02:00 (CEST)
- Postal code: 2046
- SFOS number: 6479
- ISO 3166 code: CH-NE
- Surrounded by: Boudevilliers, Cernier, Engollon, Fenin-Vilars-Saules, Fontainemelon, La Chaux-de-Fonds, La Sagne, Les Hauts-Geneveys, Renan (BE)
- Website: www.fontaines-ne.ch

Fontaines is a former municipality in the district of Val-de-Ruz in the canton of Neuchâtel in Switzerland.

The municipalities of Boudevilliers, Cernier, Chézard-Saint-Martin, Coffrane, Dombresson, Engollon, Fenin-Vilars-Saules, Fontainemelon, Fontaines, Les Geneveys-sur-Coffrane, Les Hauts-Geneveys, Montmollin, Le Pâquier, Savagnier and Villiers merged on 1 January 2013 into the new municipality of Val-de-Ruz.

== History ==
Fontaines is first mentioned in 1228 as Fontanes.

== Geography ==
Fontaines had an area, as of 2009, of 10.1 square kilometers (3.9 mi^{2}). Of this area, 6.39 km^{2} (2.47 mi^{2}) or 63.0% is used for agricultural purposes, while 2.89 km^{2} (1.12 mi^{2}) or 28.5% is forested. Of the rest of the land, 0.76 km^{2} (0.29 mi^{2}) or 7.5% is settled (buildings or roads), 0.04 km^{2} (9.9 acres) or 0.4% is either rivers or lakes and 0.02 km^{2} (4.9 acres) or 0.2% is unproductive land.

Of the built up area, housing and buildings made up 2.3% and transportation infrastructure made up 3.6%. Power and water infrastructure as well as other special developed areas made up 1.2% of the area Out of the forested land, 23.5% of the total land area is heavily forested and 5.0% is covered with orchards or small clusters of trees. Of the agricultural land, 29.9% is used for growing crops and 5.4% is pastures and 27.6% is used for alpine pastures. All the water in the municipality is flowing water.

The former municipality is located in the Val-de-Ruz district. It consists of the village of Fontaines and two exclaves in the mountains in the Pass La Vue-des-Alpes, which has an elevation of 1,283 m (4,209 ft).

== Coat of arms ==
The blazon of the municipal coat of arms is Azure, a Fountain Argent.

== Demographics ==
Fontaines had a population (as of 2011) of 1,132. As of 2008, 12.3% of the population are resident foreign nationals. Over the last 10 years (2000–2010) the population has changed at a rate of 21.5%. It has changed at a rate of 27.5% due to migration and at a rate of 6.4% due to births and deaths.

Most of the population (as of 2000) speaks French (830 or 91.0%) as their first language, German is the second most common (33 or 3.6%) and Italian is the third (22 or 2.4%).

As of 2008, the population was 49.7% male and 50.3% female. The population was made up of 472 Swiss men (42.7% of the population) and 77 (7.0%) non-Swiss men. There were 497 Swiss women (45.0%) and 59 (5.3%) non-Swiss women. Of the population in the municipality, 198 or about 21.7% were born in Fontaines and lived there in 2000. There were 379 or 41.6% who were born in the same canton, while 167 or 18.3% were born somewhere else in Switzerland, and 149 or 16.3% were born outside of Switzerland.

As of 2000, children and teenagers (0–19 years old) make up 29.4% of the population, while adults (20–64 years old) make up 60.9% and seniors (over 64 years old) make up 9.8%.

As of 2000, there were 391 people who were single and never married in the municipality. There were 457 married individuals, 33 widows or widowers and 31 individuals who are divorced.

As of 2000, there were 331 private households in the municipality, and an average of 2.7 persons per household. There were 76 households that consist of only one person and 29 households with five or more people. In 2000, a total of 317 apartments (84.1% of the total) were permanently occupied, while 47 apartments (12.5%) were seasonally occupied and 13 apartments (3.4%) were empty. As of 2009, the construction rate of new housing units was 6.3 new units per 1000 residents. The vacancy rate for the municipality, in 2010, was 0.22%.

The historical population is given in the following chart:

== Politics ==
In the 2007 federal election the most popular party was the SP which received 28.79% of the vote. The next three most popular parties were the SVP (22.26%), the FDP (16.5%) and the LPS Party (12.51%). In the federal election, a total of 367 votes were cast, and the voter turnout was 54.0%.

== Economy ==
As of 2010, Fontaines had an unemployment rate of 3.3%. As of 2008, there were 32 people employed in the primary economic sector and about 14 businesses involved in this sector. 366 people were employed in the secondary sector and there were 11 businesses in this sector. 84 people were employed in the tertiary sector, with 30 businesses in this sector. There were 467 residents of the municipality who were employed in some capacity, of which females made up 41.5% of the workforce.

In 2008 the total number of full-time equivalent jobs was 447. The number of jobs in the primary sector was 24, all of which were in agriculture. The number of jobs in the secondary sector was 352 of which 296 or (84.1%) were in manufacturing and 56 (15.9%) were in construction. The number of jobs in the tertiary sector was 71. In the tertiary sector; 16 or 22.5% were in wholesale or retail sales or the repair of motor vehicles, 4 or 5.6% were in the movement and storage of goods, 32 or 45.1% were in a hotel or restaurant, 2 or 2.8% were in the information industry, 2 or 2.8% were the insurance or financial industry, 2 or 2.8% were technical professionals or scientists, 3 or 4.2% were in education.

In 2000, there were 269 workers who commuted into the municipality and 359 workers who commuted away. The municipality is a net exporter of workers, with about 1.3 workers leaving the municipality for every one entering. About 13.0% of the workforce coming into Fontaines are coming from outside Switzerland. Of the working population, 12.6% used public transportation to get to work, and 68.3% used a private car.

== Religion ==
From the 2000 census, 216 or 23.7% were Roman Catholic, while 413 or 45.3% belonged to the Swiss Reformed Church. Of the rest of the population, there was 1 member of an Orthodox church, there were 6 individuals (or about 0.66% of the population) who belonged to the Christian Catholic Church, and there were 49 individuals (or about 5.37% of the population) who belonged to another Christian church. There were 7 (or about 0.77% of the population) who were Islamic. There were 2 individuals who were Buddhist and 4 individuals who belonged to another church. 208 (or about 22.81% of the population) belonged to no church, are agnostic or atheist, and 30 individuals (or about 3.29% of the population) did not answer the question.

== Education ==
In Fontaines about 319 or (35.0%) of the population have completed non-mandatory upper secondary education, and 128 or (14.0%) have completed additional higher education (either university or a Fachhochschule). Of the 128 who completed tertiary schooling, 57.0% were Swiss men, 28.1% were Swiss women, 9.4% were non-Swiss men and 5.5% were non-Swiss women.

In the canton of Neuchâtel most municipalities provide two years of non-mandatory kindergarten, followed by five years of mandatory primary education. The next four years of mandatory secondary education is provided at thirteen larger secondary schools, which many students travel out of their home municipality to attend. During the 2010-11 school year, there were 2 kindergarten classes with a total of 29 students in Fontaines. In the same year, there were 5 primary classes with a total of 90 students.

As of 2000, there were 12 students in Fontaines who came from another municipality, while 151 residents attended schools outside the municipality.
