= Battle of Coffrane =

Coordinates: 47°1′N 6°52′E

The Battle of Coffrane took place on February 28, 1296, about 1 km east of Coffrane in the canton of Neuchâtel in a field known locally as "la male fin" (lit. the bad end) which crosses the Sauge river.

The Lords of Valangin, under Jean de Valangin and Thierry de Valangin with support from the Bishop of Basel, Pierre d'Aspelt, rebelled against the Count Rollin of Neuchâtel. This was due to a 1293 ruling that declared that the lords of Valangin should recognise count Rollin's suzerainty, which the counts of Valangin refused. The lords of Valangin, wishing toe secure more power, sought the help of the Bishop of Basel by pledging lands to him.

The battle was fought in the Val-de-Ruz next to the village of Coffrane. The Count of Neuchâtel quickly won the battle, reasserting his authority against the Lords of Valangin, whom were forced into submission and they were forced to cede the Mairie de Boudevillier to the count, pay for war expenses and offer two heads of 25 marks each as tribute. These heads where later taken during the reformation in 1530.

Following the battle, Count Rollin destroyed the town of Bonneville, a Valangin stronghold. Refugees thereof fled to Engollon, whilst others founded La Neuveville near the Lake of Bienne
