= Villiers, Switzerland =

Villiers
- Former municipality
- Coat of arms
- Location of Villiers
- Location within Switzerland Location within Canton of Neuchâtel
- Coordinates: 47°5′N 6°58′E
- Country: Switzerland
- Canton: Neuchâtel
- District: Val-de-Ruz

Area
  - Total: 10.59 km^{2} (4.09 sq mi)
- Elevation: 760 m (2,490 ft)

Population (December 2011)
  - Total: 450
  - Density: 42/km^{2} (110/sq mi)
- Time zone: UTC+01:00 (CET)
  - Summer (DST): UTC+02:00 (CEST)
- Postal code: 2057
- SFOS number: 6486
- ISO 3166 code: CH-NE
- Surrounded by: Dombresson, Enges, Le Pâquier, Lignières, Nods (BE), Saint-Imier (BE), Savagnier, Villeret (BE)
- Website: SFSO statistics

Villiers is a former municipality in the district of Val-de-Ruz in the canton of Neuchâtel in Switzerland.

The municipalities of Boudevilliers, Cernier, Chézard-Saint-Martin, Coffrane, Dombresson, Engollon, Fenin-Vilars-Saules, Fontainemelon, Fontaines, Les Geneveys-sur-Coffrane, Les Hauts-Geneveys, Montmollin, Le Pâquier, Savagnier and Villiers merged on 1 January 2013 into the new municipality of Val-de-Ruz.

== History ==
Villiers is first mentioned in 1191 as in Vilar. In 1308 it was mentioned as de Villier.

== Geography ==
Aerial view from 1600 m by Walter Mittelholzer (1926)

Villiers had an area, as of 2009, of 10.6 square kilometers (4.1 mi^{2}). Of this area, 4.7 km^{2} (1.8 mi^{2}) or 44.5% is used for agricultural purposes, while 5.61 km^{2} (2.17 mi^{2}) or 53.1% is forested. Of the rest of the land, 0.27 km^{2} (0.10 mi^{2}) or 2.6% is settled (buildings or roads) and 0.02 km^{2} (4.9 acres) or 0.2% is unproductive land.

Of the built up area, housing and buildings made up 1.5% and transportation infrastructure made up 0.9%. Out of the forested land, 49.4% of the total land area is heavily forested and 3.7% is covered with orchards or small clusters of trees. Of the agricultural land, 8.3% is used for growing crops and 17.1% is pastures and 18.8% is used for alpine pastures.

The former municipality is located in the Val de Ruz district, at the foot of the Chaumont and near the source of the Seyon river. It consists of the village of Villiers, the hamlet of Clémesin and the alpine pastures of de La Dame, Chuffort, Aarberg, Ile-Frienisberg and Dombresson.

== Coat of arms ==
The blazon of the municipal coat of arms is Gules, a Heart Argent and in chief a Mullet of Eight of the same.

== Demographics ==
Villiers had a population (as of 2011) of 450. As of 2008, 7.1% of the population are resident foreign nationals. Over the last 10 years (2000–2010) the population has changed at a rate of 14.8%. Migration accounted for 8.8%, while births and deaths accounted for 7%.

Most of the population (as of 2000) speaks French (379 or 96.2%) as their first language, German is the second most common (9 or 2.3%) and English is the third (2 or 0.5%). There is 1 person who speaks Italian.

As of 2008, the population was 50.1% male and 49.9% female. The population was made up of 201 Swiss men (46.4% of the population) and 16 (3.7%) non-Swiss men. There were 197 Swiss women (45.5%) and 19 (4.4%) non-Swiss women. Of the population in the municipality, 111 or about 28.2% were born in Villiers and lived there in 2000. There were 159 or 40.4% who were born in the same canton, while 82 or 20.8% were born somewhere else in Switzerland, and 35 or 8.9% were born outside of Switzerland.

As of 2000, children and teenagers (0–19 years old) make up 32% of the population, while adults (20–64 years old) make up 60.9% and seniors (over 64 years old) make up 7.1%.

As of 2000, there were 172 people who were single and never married in the municipality. There were 185 married individuals, 16 widows or widowers and 21 individuals who are divorced.

As of 2000, there were 135 private households in the municipality, and an average of 2.9 persons per household. There were 26 households that consist of only one person and 17 households with five or more people. In 2000, a total of 133 apartments (82.1% of the total) were permanently occupied, while 26 apartments (16.0%) were seasonally occupied and 3 apartments (1.9%) were empty. As of 2009, the construction rate of new housing units was 2.3 new units per 1000 residents.

The historical population is given in the following chart:

== Politics ==
In the 2007 federal election the most popular party was the SVP which received 27.66% of the vote. The next three most popular parties were the SP (21.64%), the LPS Party (19.68%) and the Green Party (11.81%). In the federal election, a total of 181 votes were cast, and the voter turnout was 57.8%.

== Economy ==
As of 2010, Villiers had an unemployment rate of 3.6%. As of 2008, there were 27 people employed in the primary economic sector and about 11 businesses involved in this sector. 64 people were employed in the secondary sector and there were 6 businesses in this sector. 31 people were employed in the tertiary sector, with 8 businesses in this sector. There were 204 residents of the municipality who were employed in some capacity, of which females made up 43.6% of the workforce.

In 2008 the total number of full-time equivalent jobs was 99. The number of jobs in the primary sector was 21, all of which were in agriculture. The number of jobs in the secondary sector was 56 of which 52 or (92.9%) were in manufacturing and 4 (7.1%) were in construction. The number of jobs in the tertiary sector was 22. In the tertiary sector; 1 was in the sale or repair of motor vehicles, 4 or 18.2% were in a hotel or restaurant and 1 was in the information industry.

In 2000, there were 52 workers who commuted into the municipality and 155 workers who commuted away. The municipality is a net exporter of workers, with about 3.0 workers leaving the municipality for every one entering. Of the working population, 10.3% used public transportation to get to work, and 67.2% used a private car.

== Religion ==
From the 2000 census, 58 or 14.7% were Roman Catholic, while 205 or 52.0% belonged to the Swiss Reformed Church. Of the rest of the population, there were 16 individuals (or about 4.06% of the population) who belonged to another Christian church. There were 3 individuals (or about 0.76% of the population) who were Jewish, and 116 (or about 29.44% of the population) belonged to no church, are agnostic or atheist, and 4 individuals (or about 1.02% of the population) did not answer the question.

== Education ==
In Villiers about 146 or (37.1%) of the population have completed non-mandatory upper secondary education, and 50 or (12.7%) have completed additional higher education (either university or a Fachhochschule). Of the 50 who completed tertiary schooling, 56.0% were Swiss men, 38.0% were Swiss women.

In the canton of Neuchâtel most municipalities provide two years of non-mandatory kindergarten, followed by five years of mandatory primary education. The next four years of mandatory secondary education is provided at thirteen larger secondary schools, which many students travel out of their home municipality to attend. The kindergarten is combined with Le Pâquier and Dombresson while the primary school is combined with Dombresson. During the 2010–11 school year, there were 3 kindergarten classes with a total of 50 students between the municipalities. In the same year, there were 8 primary classes with a total of 156 students.

As of 2000, there were 86 students from Villiers who attended schools outside the municipality.
