= Fenin-Vilars-Saules =

- Former municipality
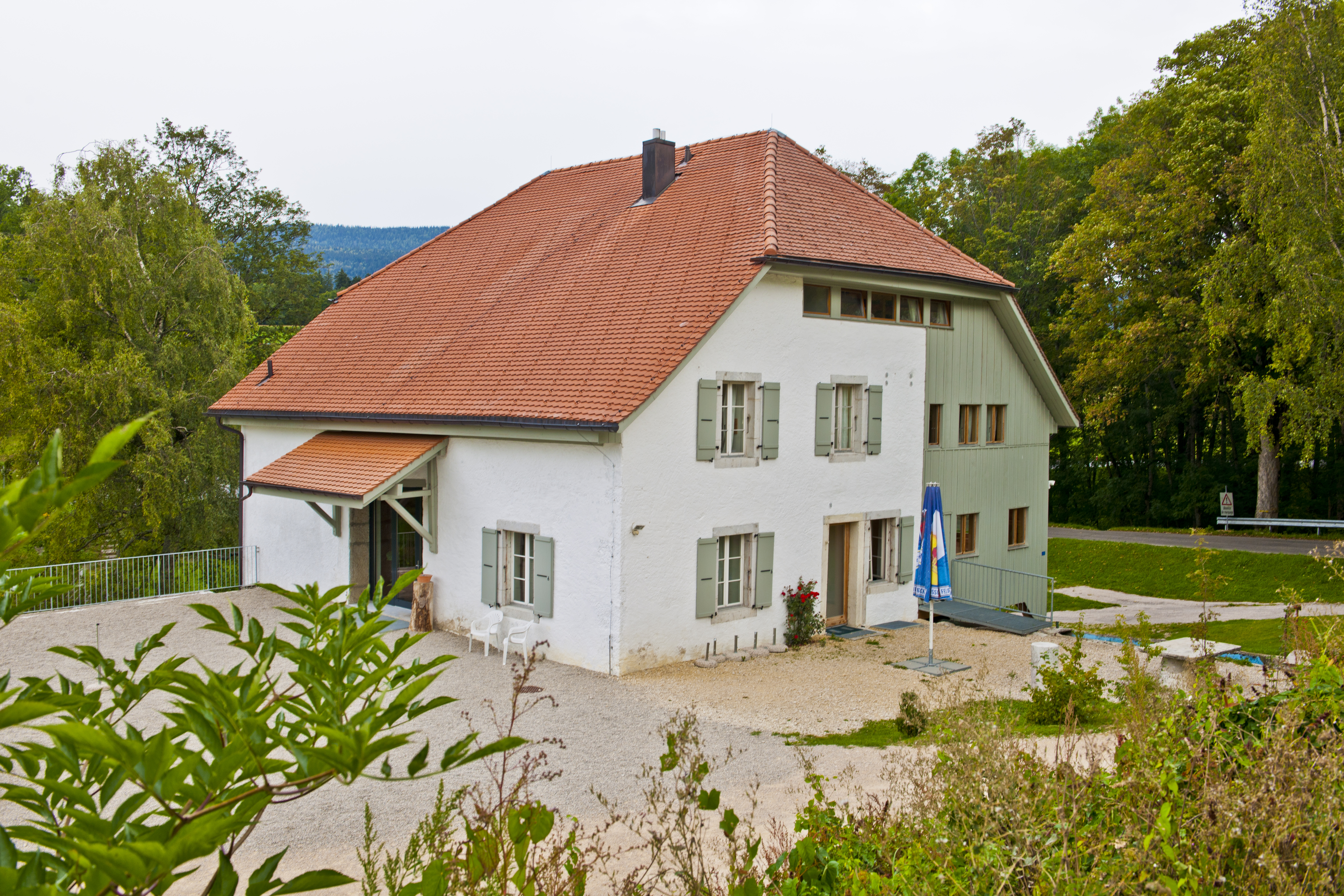
- Historic Moulin (mill) de Bayerel in Fenin-Vilars-Saules

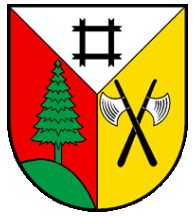
- Coat of arms
- Location of Fenin-Vilars-Saules
- Location within Switzerland Location within Canton of Neuchâtel
- Coordinates: 47°2′N 6°56′E
- Country: Switzerland
- Canton: Neuchâtel
- District: Val-de-Ruz

Area
  - Total: 6.48 km^{2} (2.50 sq mi)
- Elevation: 750 m (2,460 ft)

Population (December 2011)
  - Total: 832
  - Density: 128/km^{2} (333/sq mi)
- Time zone: UTC+01:00 (CET)
  - Summer (DST): UTC+02:00 (CEST)
- Postal code: 2063
- SFOS number: 6477
- ISO 3166 code: CH-NE
- Surrounded by: Engollon, Fontaines, Neuchâtel, Savagnier, Valangin
- Website: SFSO statistics

Fenin-Vilars-Saules is a former municipality in the district of Val-de-Ruz in the canton of Neuchâtel in Switzerland.

The municipalities of Boudevilliers, Cernier, Chézard-Saint-Martin, Coffrane, Dombresson, Engollon, Fenin-Vilars-Saules, Fontainemelon, Fontaines, Les Geneveys-sur-Coffrane, Les Hauts-Geneveys, Montmollin, Le Pâquier, Savagnier and Villiers merged on 1 January 2013 into the new municipality of Val-de-Ruz.

== History ==
Fenin-Vilars-Saules was created in 1875 when Fenin, Vilars and Saules merged. Fenin was first mentioned in 1191 as de Finilis and Saules was mentioned in 1269 as Sales.

== Geography ==
Aerial view from 1500 m by Walter Mittelholzer (1927)

Fenin-Vilars-Saules had an area, as of 2009, of 6.5 square kilometers (2.5 mi^{2}). Of this area, 2.85 km^{2} (1.10 mi^{2}) or 44.0% is used for agricultural purposes, while 3.2 km^{2} (1.2 mi^{2}) or 49.4% is forested. Of the rest of the land, 0.45 km^{2} (0.17 mi^{2}) or 6.9% is settled (buildings or roads).

Of the built up area, housing and buildings made up 4.6% and transportation infrastructure made up 1.7%. Out of the forested land, 48.0% of the total land area is heavily forested and 1.4% is covered with orchards or small clusters of trees. Of the agricultural land, 29.6% is used for growing crops and 13.6% is pastures.

== Coat of arms ==
The blazon of the municipal coat of arms is Per pall, Argent a Grill Sable, Gules, from a mount Vert in dexter issuant a Pine tree of the same, and Or, two Adzes Argent handled Sable. The three parts of the coat of arms come from the three municipalities that merged in 1875. The black grill on white is from Fenin, the green fir-tree on red from Vilars, and two white adzes on yellow in Saules.

== Demographics ==
Fenin-Vilars-Saules had a population (as of 2011) of 832. As of 2008, 9.5% of the population are resident foreign nationals. Over the last 10 years (2000–2010) the population has changed at a rate of 10.9%. It has changed at a rate of 5% due to migration and at a rate of 7.7% due to births and deaths.

Most of the population (as of 2000) speaks French (713 or 93.2%) as their first language, German is the second most common (27 or 3.5%) and English is the third (7 or 0.9%). There are 3 people who speak Italian.

As of 2008, the population was 49.8% male and 50.2% female. The population was made up of 365 Swiss men (44.5% of the population) and 43 (5.2%) non-Swiss men. There were 373 Swiss women (45.5%) and 39 (4.8%) non-Swiss women. Of the population in the municipality, 149 or about 19.5% were born in Fenin-Vilars-Saules and lived there in 2000. There were 308 or 40.3% who were born in the same canton, while 179 or 23.4% were born somewhere else in Switzerland, and 105 or 13.7% were born outside of Switzerland.

As of 2000, children and teenagers (0–19 years old) make up 23% of the population, while adults (20–64 years old) make up 63.9% and seniors (over 64 years old) make up 13.1%.

As of 2000, there were 277 people who were single and never married in the municipality. There were 393 married individuals, 36 widows or widowers and 59 individuals who are divorced.

As of 2000, there were 283 private households in the municipality, and an average of 2.5 persons per household. There were 61 households that consist of only one person and 15 households with five or more people. In 2000, a total of 273 apartments (88.3% of the total) were permanently occupied, while 28 apartments (9.1%) were seasonally occupied and 8 apartments (2.6%) were empty. As of 2009, the construction rate of new housing units was 1.3 new units per 1000 residents. The vacancy rate for the municipality, in 2010, was 0.3%.

The historical population is given in the following chart:

== Heritage sites of national significance ==
The Moulin de Bayerel is listed as a Swiss heritage site of national significance.

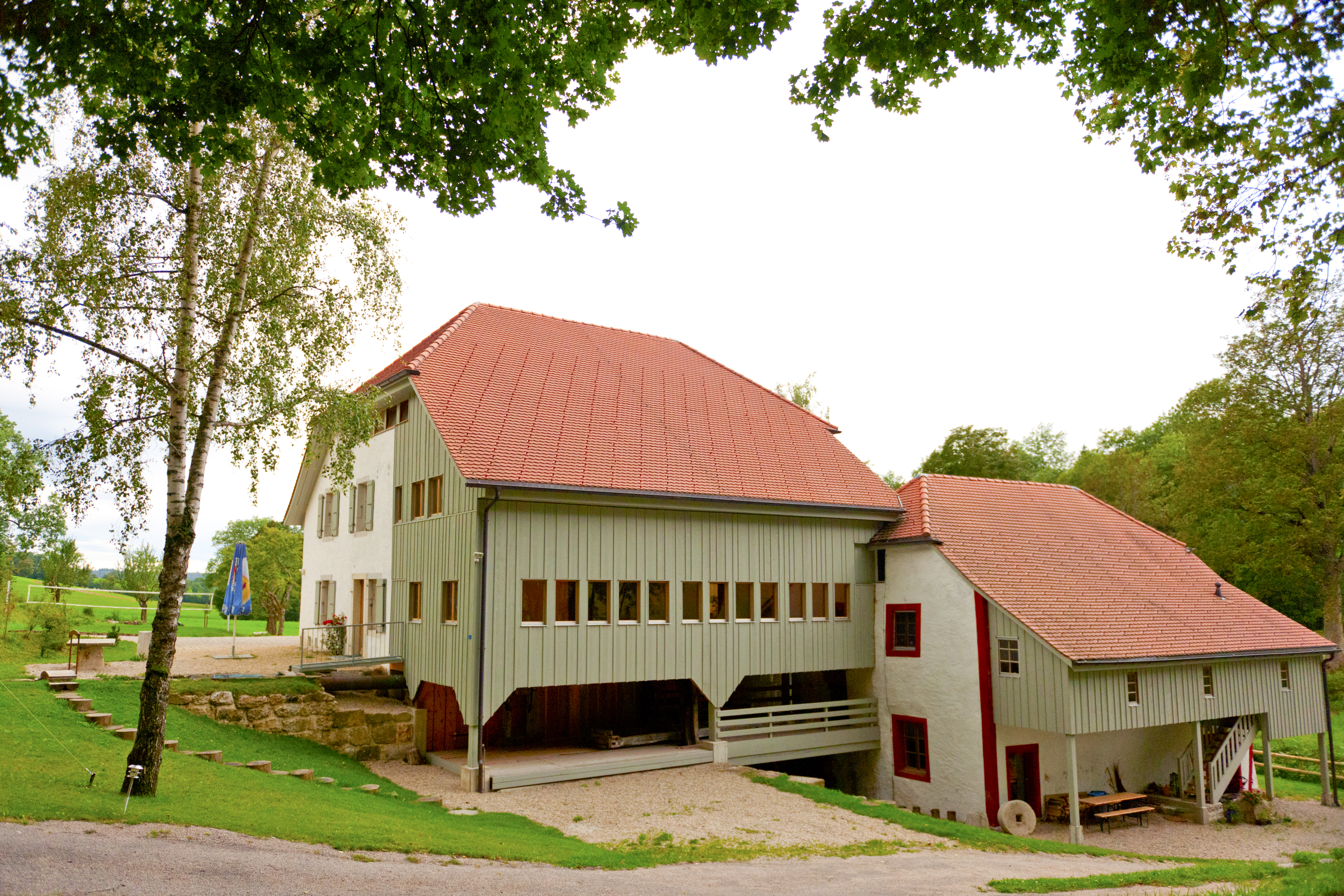
Exterior of the Mill

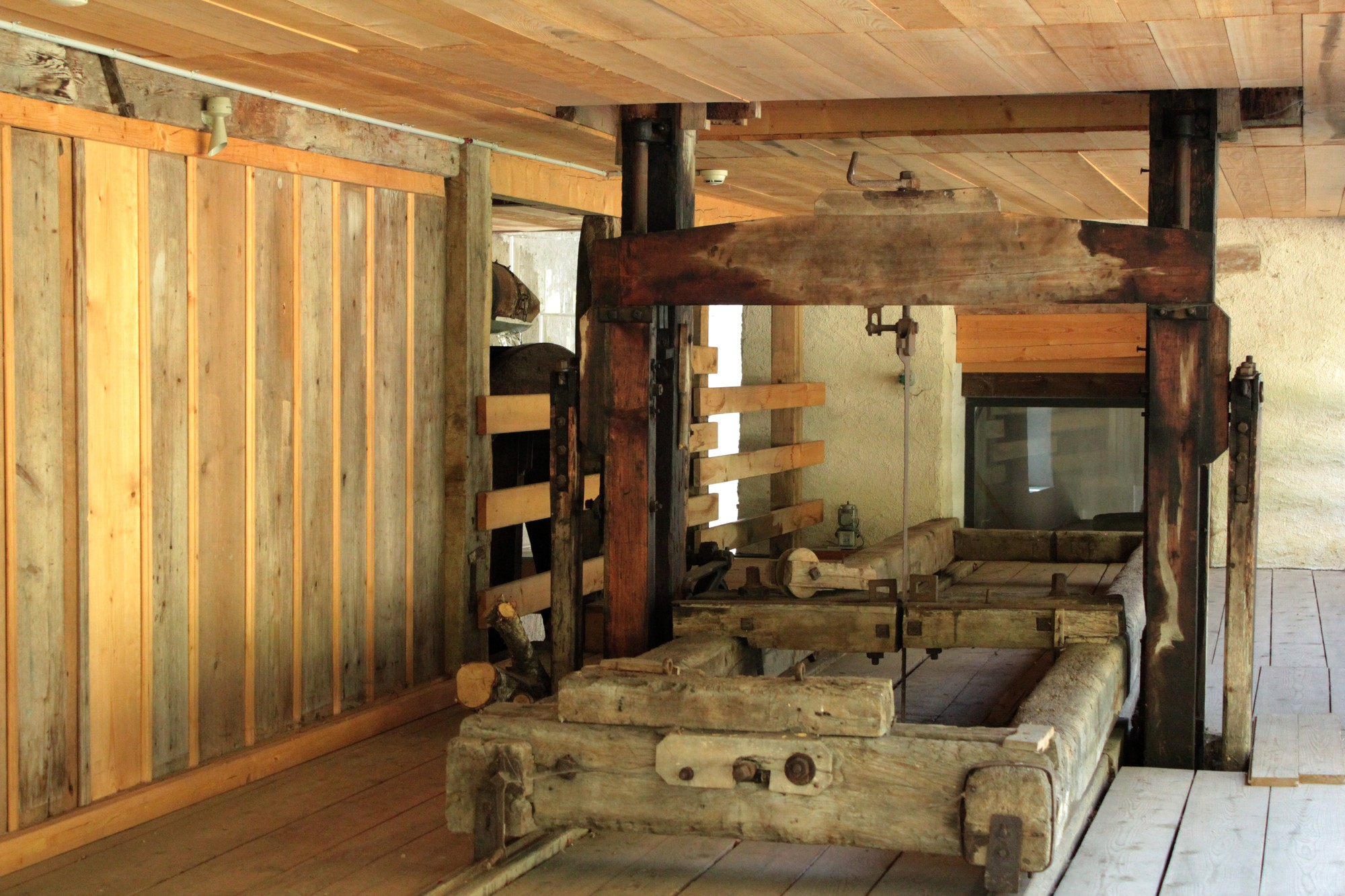
Interior of the mill

== Politics ==
In the 2007 federal election the most popular party was the SVP which received 22.46% of the vote. The next three most popular parties were the SP (20.81%), the LPS Party (19.9%) and the FDP (15.86%). In the federal election, a total of 360 votes were cast, and the voter turnout was 61.3%.

== Economy ==
As of 2010, Fenin-Vilars-Saules had an unemployment rate of 3.2%. As of 2008, there were 23 people employed in the primary economic sector and about 9 businesses involved in this sector. 38 people were employed in the secondary sector and there were 14 businesses in this sector. 107 people were employed in the tertiary sector, with 16 businesses in this sector. There were 419 residents of the municipality who were employed in some capacity, of which females made up 45.3% of the workforce.

In 2008 the total number of full-time equivalent jobs was 131. The number of jobs in the primary sector was 19, all of which were in agriculture. The number of jobs in the secondary sector was 34 of which 15 or (44.1%) were in manufacturing and 19 (55.9%) were in construction. The number of jobs in the tertiary sector was 78. In the tertiary sector; 2 or 2.6% were in wholesale or retail sales or the repair of motor vehicles, 2 or 2.6% were in the movement and storage of goods, 13 or 16.7% were in a hotel or restaurant, 7 or 9.0% were technical professionals or scientists, 14 or 17.9% were in education and 30 or 38.5% were in health care.

In 2000, there were 73 workers who commuted into the municipality and 327 workers who commuted away. The municipality is a net exporter of workers, with about 4.5 workers leaving the municipality for every one entering. Of the working population, 10% used public transportation to get to work, and 73% used a private car.

== Religion ==
From the 2000 census, 165 or 21.6% were Roman Catholic, while 372 or 48.6% belonged to the Swiss Reformed Church. Of the rest of the population, there were 3 members of an Orthodox church (or about 0.39% of the population), and there were 38 individuals (or about 4.97% of the population) who belonged to another Christian church. There were 6 (or about 0.78% of the population) who were Islamic. There were 1 individual who belonged to another church. 171 (or about 22.35% of the population) belonged to no church, are agnostic or atheist, and 28 individuals (or about 3.66% of the population) did not answer the question.

== Education ==
In Fenin-Vilars-Saules about 311 or (40.7%) of the population have completed non-mandatory upper secondary education, and 144 or (18.8%) have completed additional higher education (either university or a Fachhochschule). Of the 144 who completed tertiary schooling, 56.9% were Swiss men, 29.2% were Swiss women, 7.6% were non-Swiss men and 6.3% were non-Swiss women.

In the canton of Neuchâtel most municipalities provide two years of non-mandatory kindergarten, followed by five years of mandatory primary education. The next four years of mandatory secondary education is provided at thirteen larger secondary schools, which many students travel out of their home municipality to attend. Both the kindergarten and the primary school are combined with Engollon. During the 2010–11 school year, there was one kindergarten class with a total of 23 students between the municipalities. In the same year, there were 3 primary classes with a total of 56 students.

As of 2000, there were 3 students in Fenin-Vilars-Saules who came from another municipality, while 63 residents attended schools outside the municipality.
