= Tête de Ran =

Mountain in Switzerland

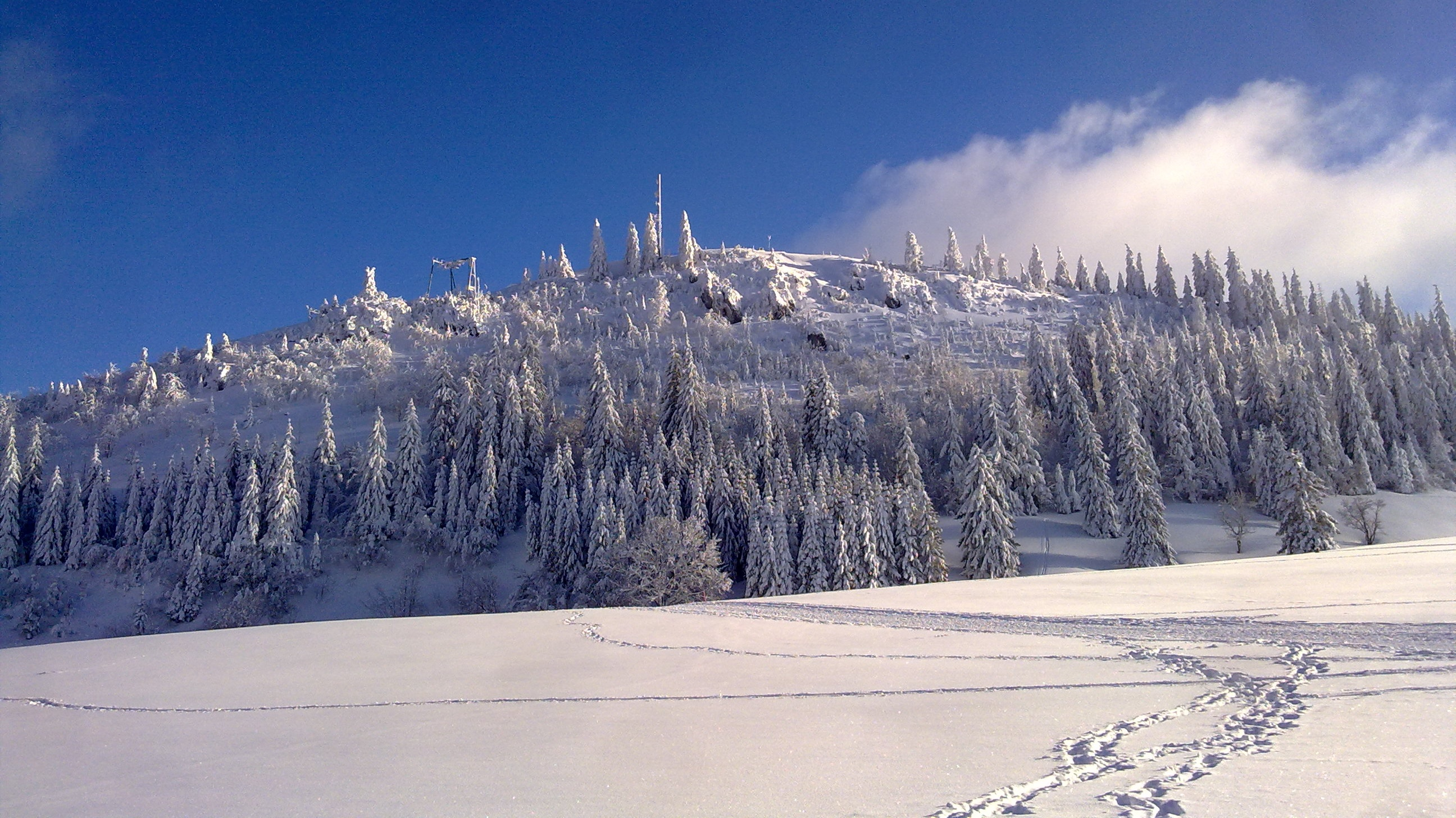
- North side

Highest point
- Elevation: 1,422 m (4,665 ft)
- Prominence: 42 m (138 ft)
- Parent peak: Rochers Bruns (1,430 m)
- Coordinates: 47°03′15″N 6°51′12″E

Geography
- Location within Switzerland
- Location: Neuchâtel, Switzerland
- Parent range: Jura Mountains

The Tête de Ran (1,422 m) is a mountain of the Jura, located south-west of the Vue des Alpes in the canton of Neuchâtel.

The summit is easily accessible with a road culminating at 1,329 metres. Several surface ski-lifts are located on the southern slopes, but are no longer in operation as of 2021.
