= Katharina Franziska von Wattenwyl =

Swiss spy

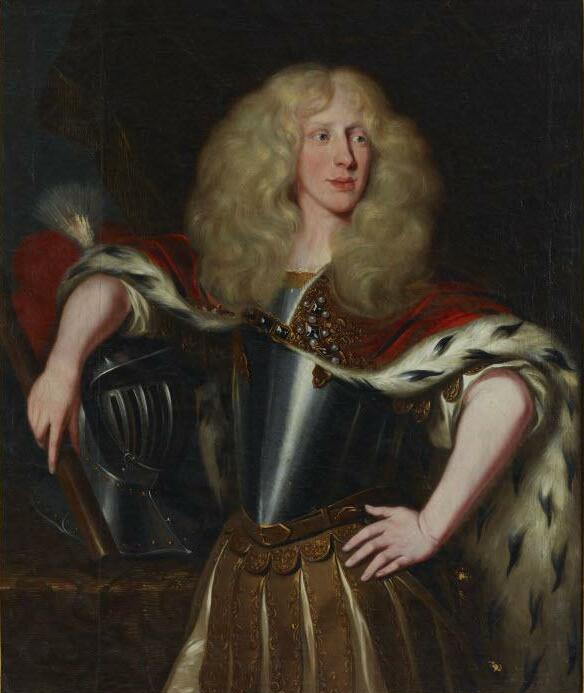
- 1674 oil portrait by Theodor Roos of von Wattenwyl in armor
- Born: December 1645; Bonmont Abbey, Chéserex, Vaud, Switzerland
- Died: 21 November 1714 (aged 68); Valangin Castle, Valangin, Principality of Neuchâtel
- Occupation: spy
- Spouses: Abraham Le Clerc; Samuel Perregaux
- Children: 2
- Parent(s): Gabriel von Wattenwyl; Barbara von Wattenwyl

Katharina Franziska von Wattenwyl (December 1645 – 21 November 1714) was a Swiss aristocrat and spy. During the Nine Years' War she served as a spy for Louis XIV, for which she was imprisoned at Käfigturm, tortured, and charged with espionage and high treason by the court in Bern. She was sentenced to death in 1690 but, upon the requests of her family, her sentence was reduced to life in exile. She was released from prison in 1692 and fled to Valangin Castle in the Principality of Neuchâtel, where she lived the remainder of her life. While in exile, she wrote a memoir that she dedicated to her second husband, Samuel Perregaux.

== Early life ==
Katharina Franziska von Wattenwyl was born in December 1645 at the Bonmont Abbey in Chéserex. She was from a Bernese patrician family and was the youngest of eleven children of Gabriel von Wattenwyl, bailiff of Bonmont and Oron, and his cousin Barbara von Wattenwyl. She grew up at Oron Castle in Vaud but lived with various relatives after she was orphaned at the age of thirteen.

Von Wattenwyl was an accomplished equestrian. At the age of twenty, she got into an argument with a French noblewoman, challenging her to a night time duel on horseback with pistols. Upon discovering that courtiers had removed the ammunition from their pistols, the duel continued with swords until a relative broke up the fight. News of the incident soon spread across Europe, leading Christina, Queen of Sweden to invite von Wattenwyl to serve as her lady-in-waiting at the Swedish court. Von Wattenwyl's family prevented her from accepting Queen Christina's invitation, as the queen had converted to Catholicism and the von Wattenwyls were staunch Protestants.

On another occasion, von Wattenwyl mastered a horse that had been regarded as untameable, leading to the owner gifting her a pair of double-barrel pistols. She used one of the pistols to shoot a Palatinate Count who harassed her while she was on a hunt.

== Marriages ==
Von Wattenwyl's relatives were troubled by her aggressive behavior, considered unsuitable for a lady of her status, and pushed for her to marry. She selected a man from the noble von Diesbach family of Fribourg, but was not permitted to marry him because he was a Catholic. She rejected all of the candidates her family presented her until, against her will, she was married off to Abraham Le Clerc, a young Protestant pastor at the Church of the Holy Ghost in Bern. Wanting to avoid the restrictions of Bernese society, she arranged for her husband to take up a post as pastor of Därstetten in the Simme Valley.

After her husband died she married a second time, in 1679, to the widower Samuel Perregaux, who served as clerk of the court and mayor of Valangin. With her second husband, she had one child: Théophile Perregaux.

== Espionage for the French ==
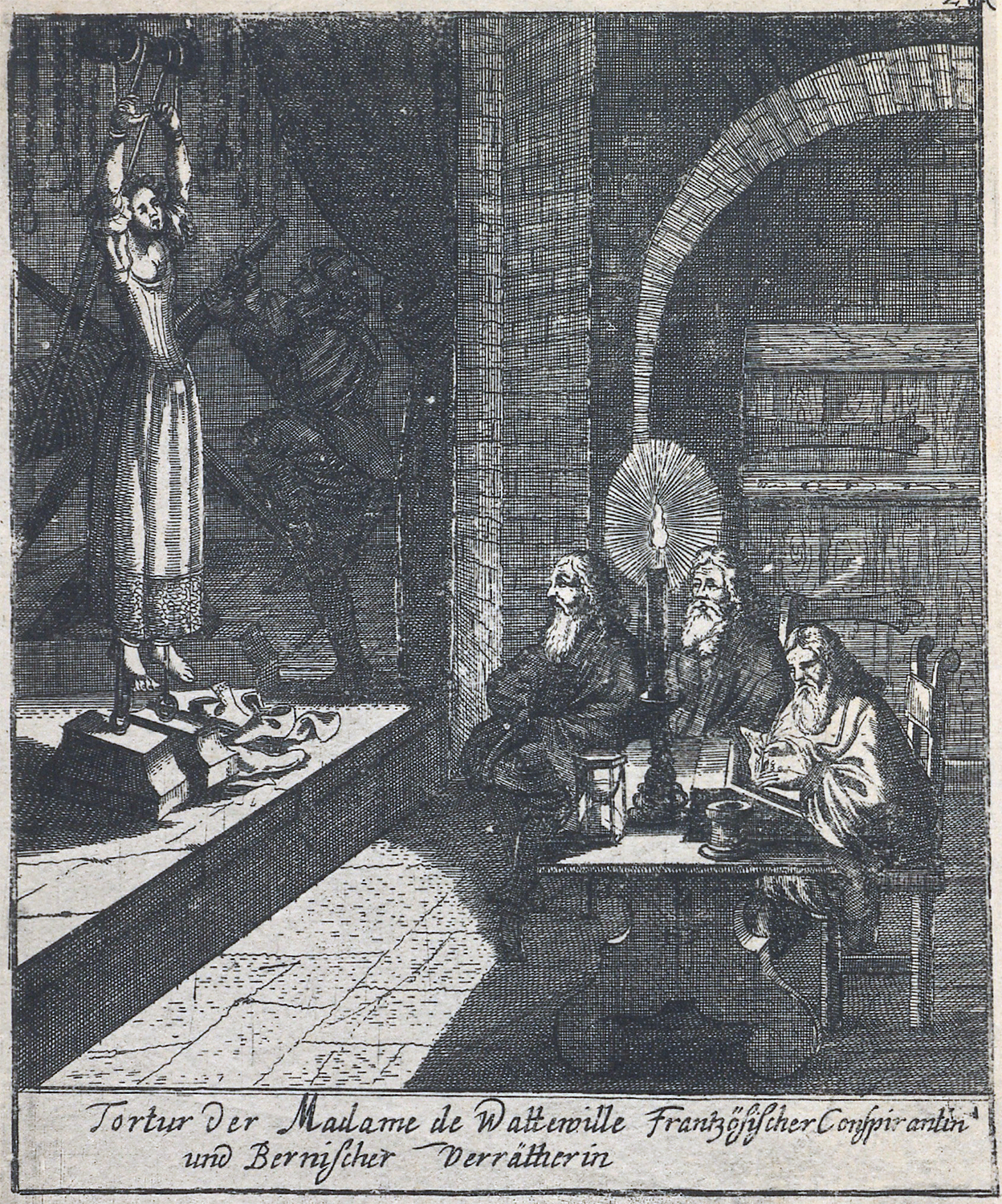
Drawing of von Wattenwyl being tortured

Von Wattenwyl was an admirer and supporter of the Bourbon monarchy. During the Nine Years' War, the French king Louis XIV had conquered Alsace, Franche-Comté, and Strasbourg and revoked the Edict of Nantes, which in-turn permitted the persecution of Huguenots. This caused many Huguenot refugees to flee to Bern, where they added to anti-French sentiment in Grand Council of Bern, which caused French sympathizers to lose political influence. Bernese leaders held secret meetings to discuss a possible alliance with the English king. Since the French ambassador Michel Amelot de Gournay was in Solothurn, he hired von Watenwyl as an agent to obtain secret information from these Swiss meetings for the French court. Von Wattenwyl sent letters containing information, some from the pro-French Bernese mayor Sigmund von Erlach, to de Gournay via a messenger.

In December 1689, her messenger was intercepted and captured. Von Wattenwyl was then arrested in the middle of the night and imprisoned at Käfigturm, where she was severely tortured for weeks.

In 1690, von Wattenwyl was sentenced to death in Bern following a high treason trial, for which she was convicted. Her family advocated on her behalf and were successful in getting her sentence reduced to life in exile from Bern. In 1692, she was released and took refuge at Valangin Castle in the Principality of Neuchâtel, where she remained until her death. While in exile, she wrote a memoir that she dedicated to her husband.

== Legacy ==
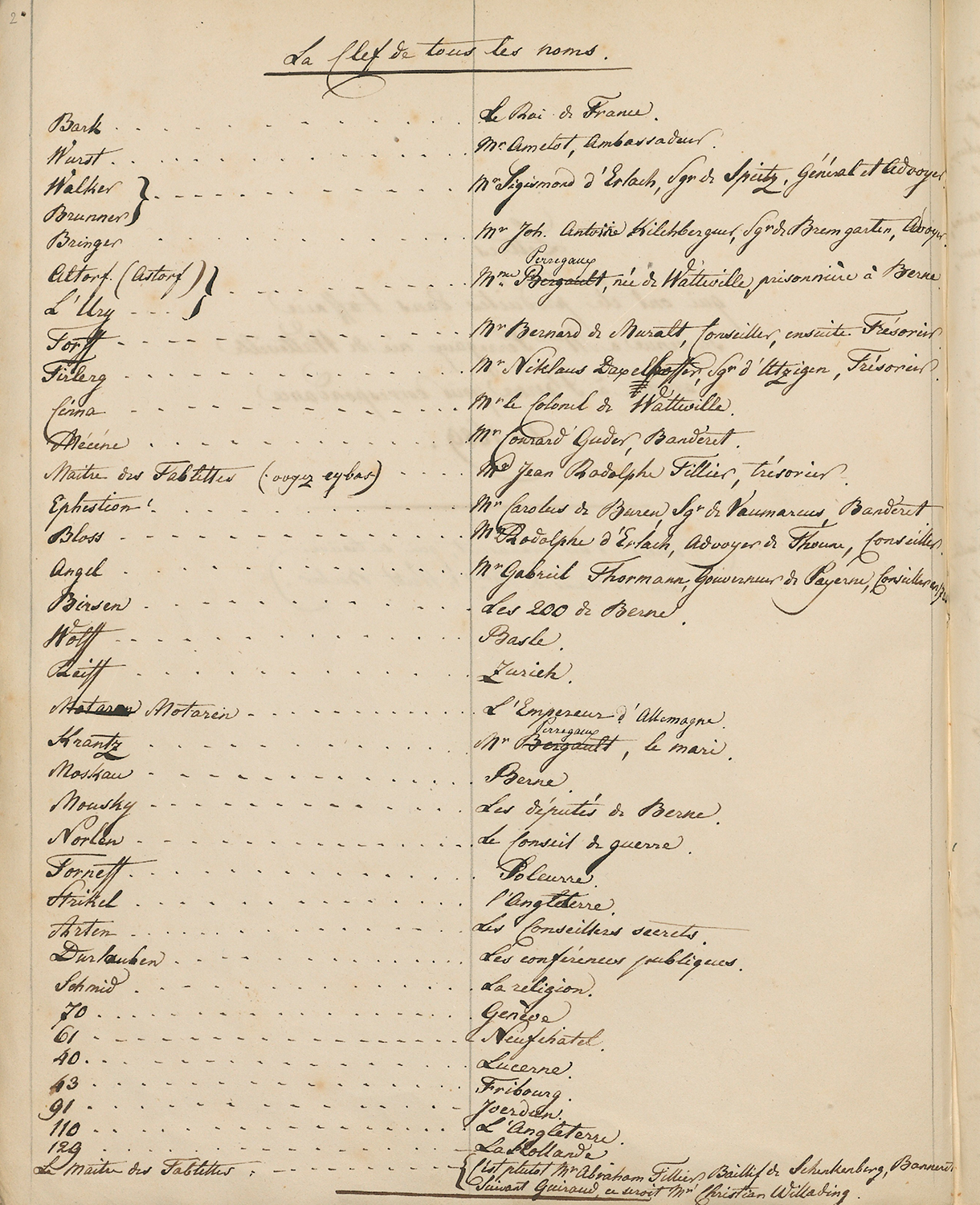
von Wattenwyl's codenames from an excerpt from her memoirs

The artist Joseph Werner criticized the trial and torture of von Wattenwyl with his miniatures from 1690 to 1691, in which he claimed that von Wattenwyl had served as a scapegoat in the disputes between pro-French and anti-French forces. Werner was commissioned by Beat Fischer von Reichenbach to create a series of drawings defending von Wattenwyl.

Adolf Frey's 1912 novel, Die Jungfer von Wattenwyl, was based on her, as was Therese Bichsel's 2004 novel Catherine von Wattenwyl.
