= Val-de-Ruz =

- Municipality
- Coat of arms
- Location of Val-de-Ruz
- Location within Switzerland Location within Canton of Neuchâtel
- Coordinates: 47°5′N 6°58′E
- Country: Switzerland
- Canton: Neuchâtel

Area
  - Total: 124.26 km^{2} (47.98 sq mi)

Population (December 2011)
  - Total: 0
  - Density: 0.0/km^{2} (0.0/sq mi)
- Time zone: UTC+01:00 (CET)
  - Summer (DST): UTC+02:00 (CEST)
- SFOS number: 6487
- ISO 3166 code: CH-NE
- Surrounded by: Lignières, Nods (BE), Saint-Imier (BE), Valangin, Villeret (BE)
- Website: www.val-de-ruz.ch

Val-de-Ruz (Arpitan: Vâl-de-Ruely) is a municipality in the canton of Neuchâtel in Switzerland.

The municipalities of Boudevilliers, Cernier, Chézard-Saint-Martin, Coffrane, Dombresson, Engollon, Fenin-Vilars-Saules, Fontainemelon, Fontaines, Les Geneveys-sur-Coffrane, Les Hauts-Geneveys, Montmollin, Le Pâquier, Savagnier and Villiers merged on 1 January 2013 into the new municipality of Val-de-Ruz. The administrative services are located in the village of Cernier.

== History ==
Aerial view from 1600 m by Walter Mittelholzer (1926)

Boudevilliers is first mentioned in 1195 as Boudeviler. Cernier is first mentioned in 1324 as Cernies. Saint-Martin is first mentioned in 998 as Sancto Martino. Petit-Chézard was mentioned in 1143 as Esser, while Grand-Chézard was first mentioned in 1285 as Chesas. Coffrane is first mentioned in 1092 as de Cusfrano. Coffrane is also the site of the Battle of Coffrane, 1296. Dombresson is first mentioned in 1178 as ecclesiam de Danbrizun. Engollon is first mentioned in 1228 as Engolun. Fenin-Vilars-Saules was created in 1875 when Fenin, Vilars and Saules merged. Fenin was first mentioned in 1191 as de Finilis and Saules was mentioned in 1269 as Sales. Fontainemelon is first mentioned about 1350 as Fontainnemelom. In 1358 it was mentioned as Fontannamillon. Fontaines is first mentioned in 1228 as Fontanes. Les Geneveys-sur-Coffrane is first mentioned about 1342 as Geneveis sus Corfranoz. Les Hauts-Geneveys is first mentioned in 1342 as Geneveis sus Fontannes. In 1599 it was mentioned as Haultz Geneveys. Montmollin is first mentioned in 1347 as Mommolens. In 1372 it was mentioned as Montmolens. Le Pâquier is first mentioned in 1328 as Pasquier. Savagnier is first mentioned in 1143 as Savaigner. Villiers is first mentioned in 1191 as in Vilar. In 1308 it was mentioned as de Villier.

== Geography ==
As of 2009, the municipalities that combined to form Val-de-Ruz had an area of 124.31 km^{2} (48.00 sq mi).

The municipality was located in the district of Val-de-Ruz, until the district level was eliminated on 1 January 2018.

== Demographics ==
Val-de-Ruz has a combined population (as of December 2020) of 17,143.

== Historic Population ==
The historical population is given in the following chart:

== Heritage sites of national significance ==
The farm house at Rue Jean-Labran 4 and the farm house at Rue Jean-Labran 6 in Chézard-Saint-Martin, the Farm House Aux Planches in Dombresson, the Engollon Church and the abandoned village of La Bonneville in Engollon and the Moulin de Bayerel in Fenin-Vilars-Saules are listed as Swiss heritage site of national significance.

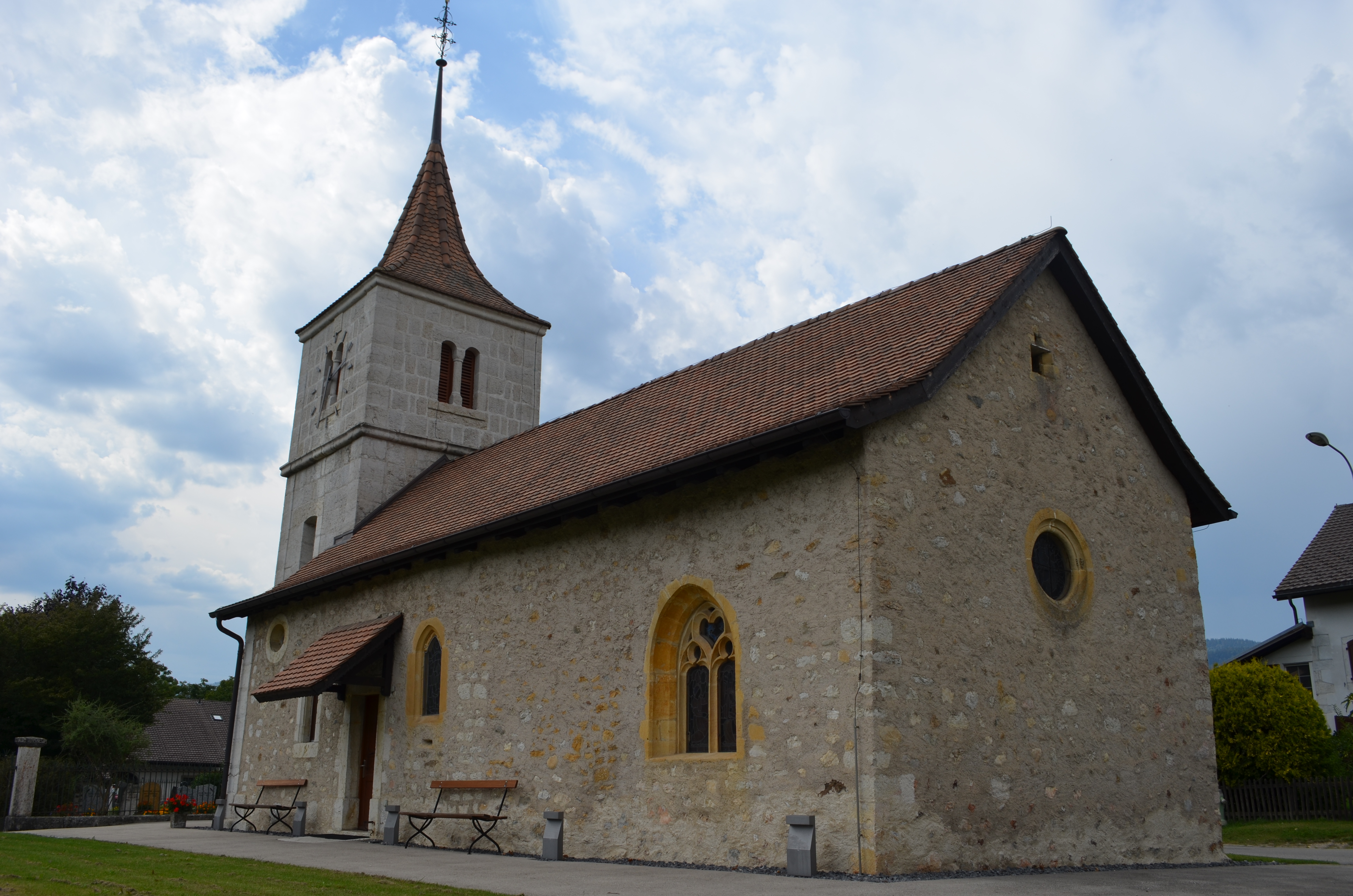
Engollon Church

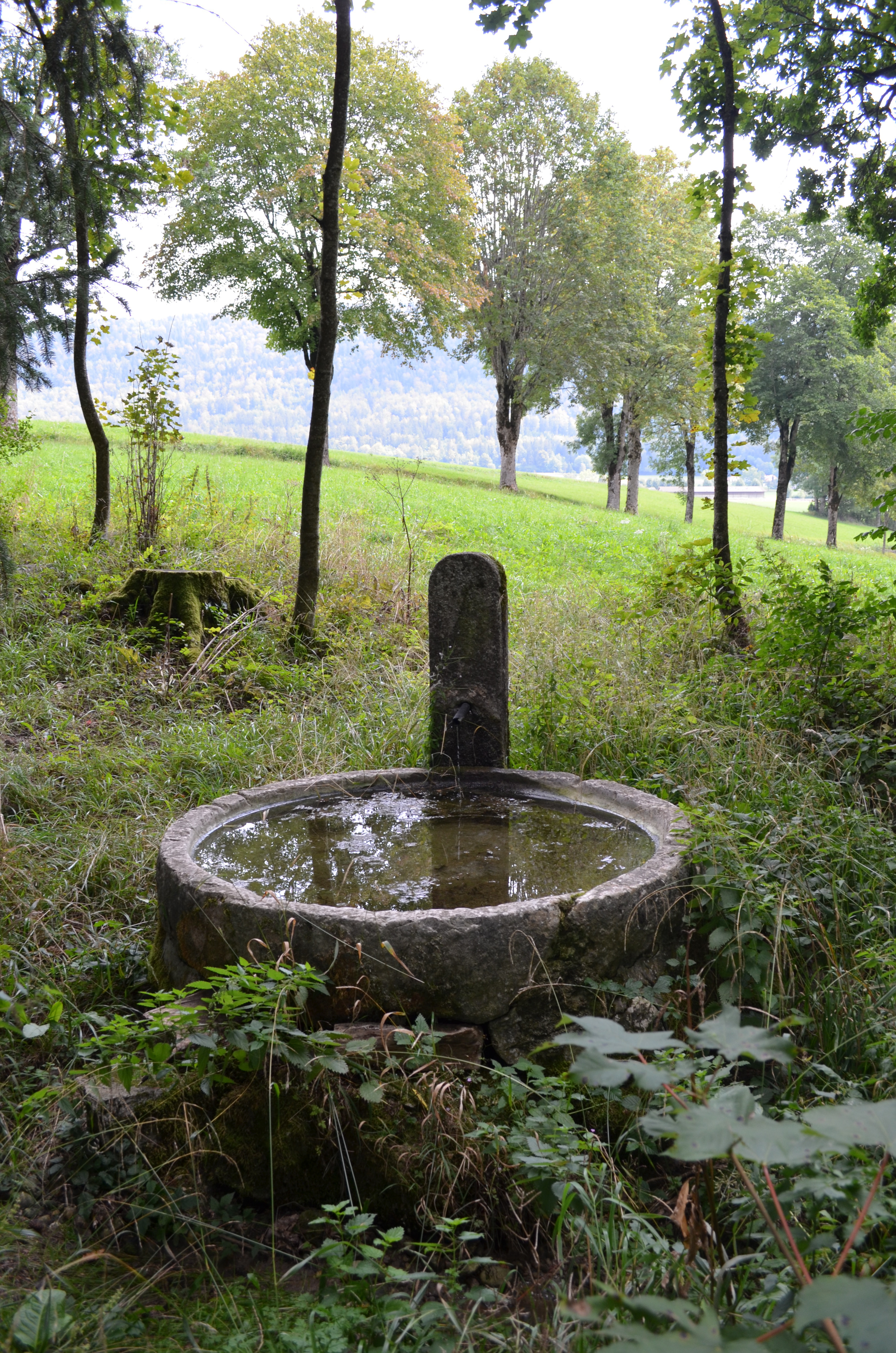
Fountain of Bonneville, all that remains of the village which was destroyed in 1301

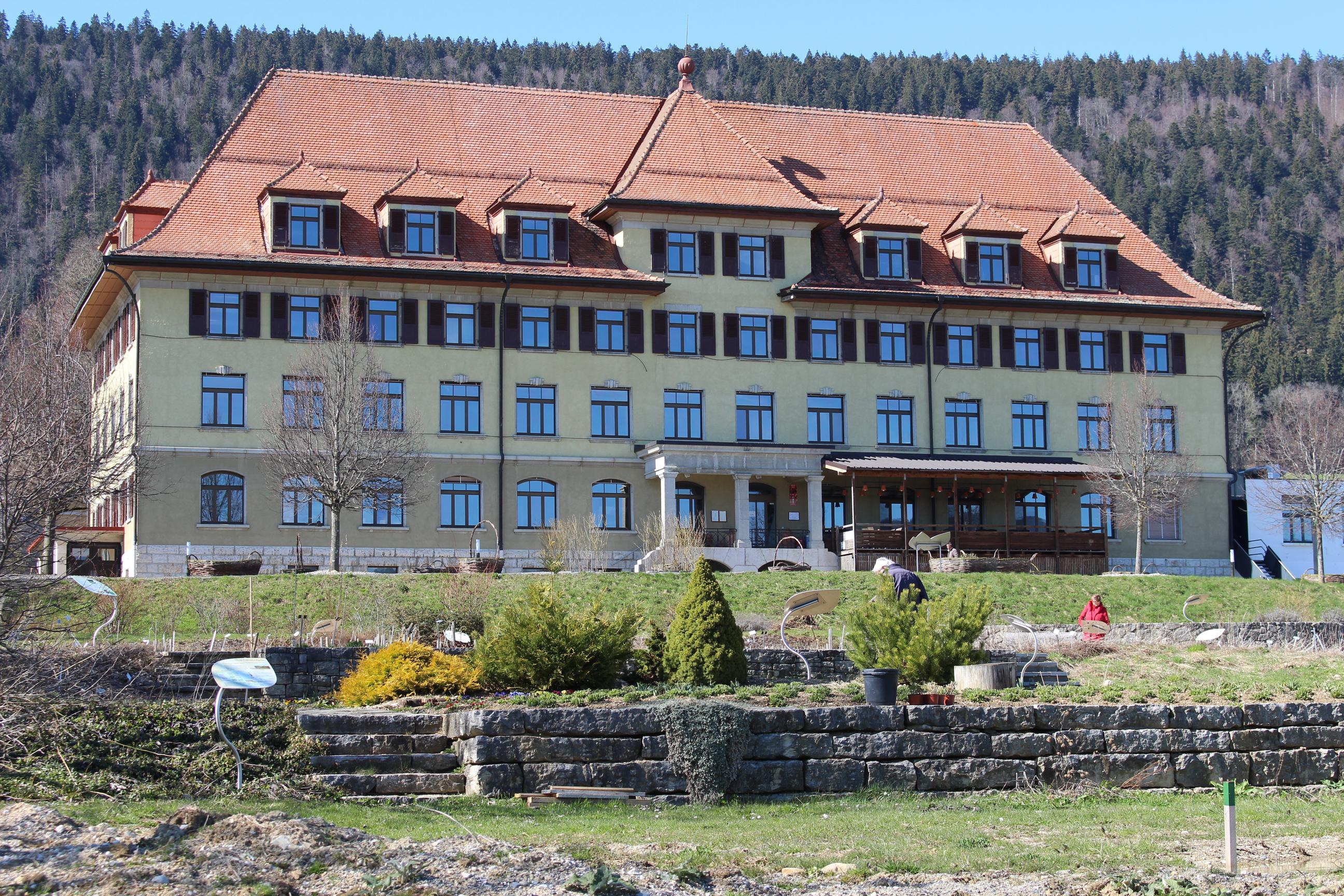
Agricultural school at Cernier

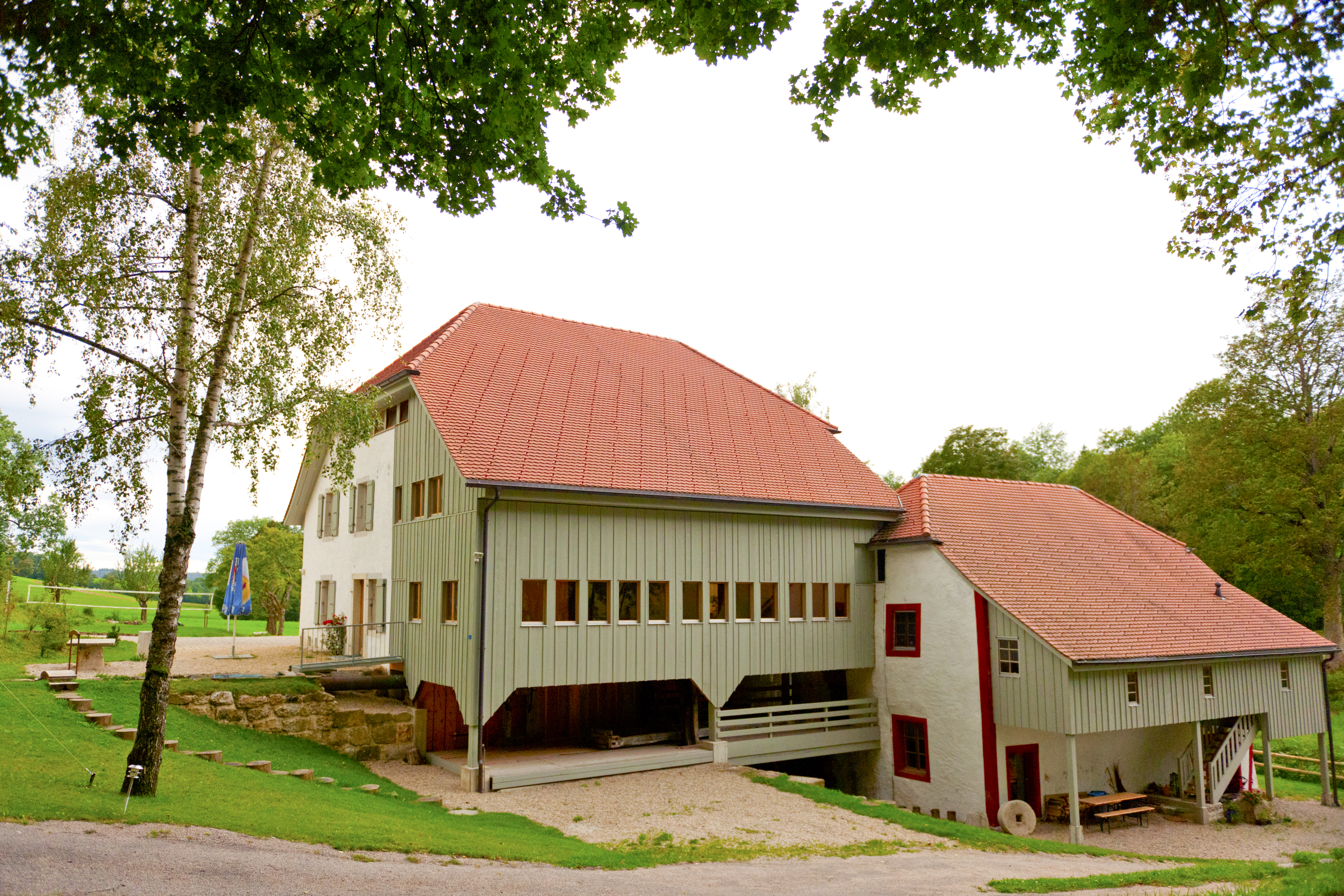
Exterior of the Mill

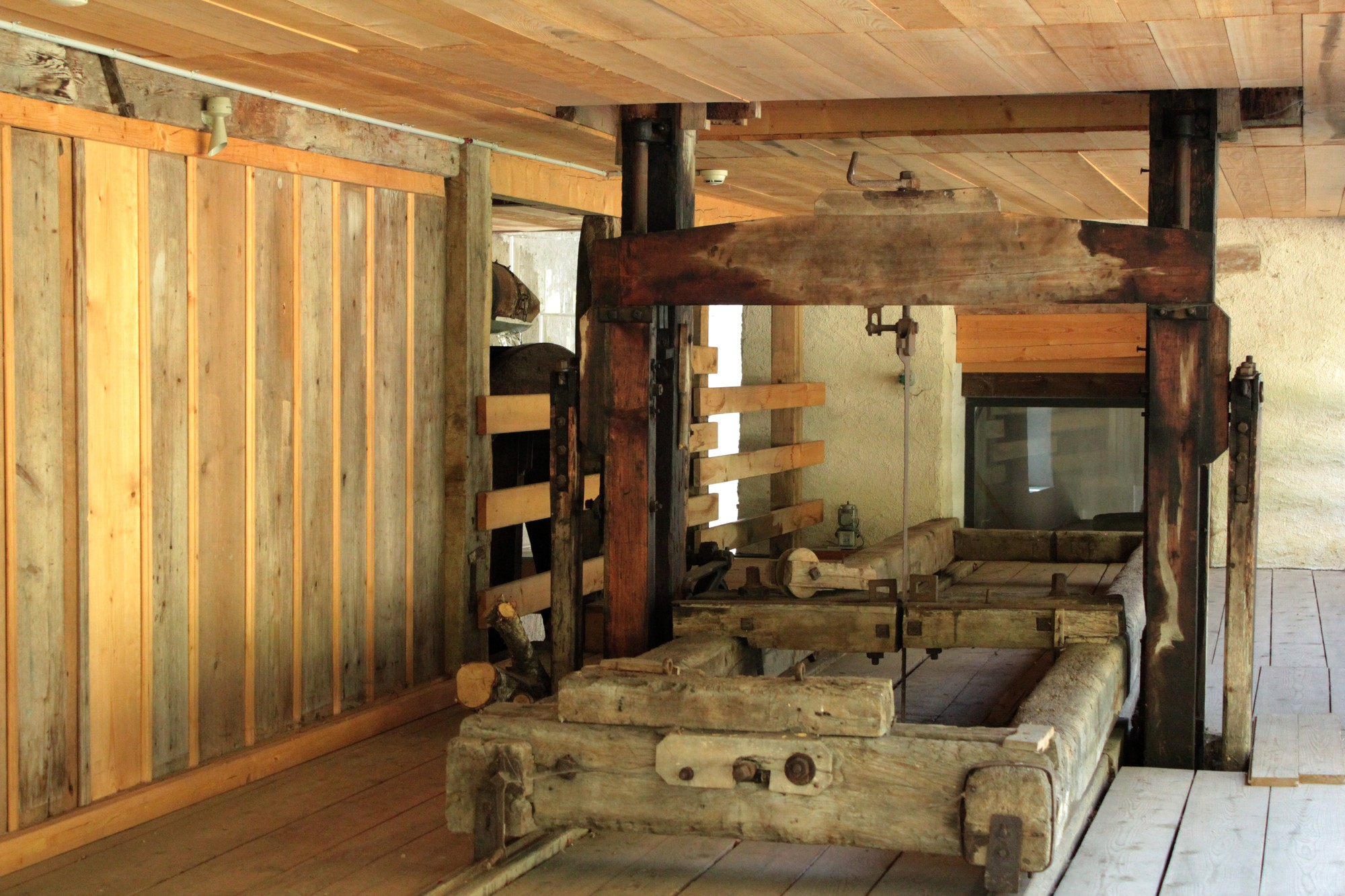
Interior of the mill

== Weather ==
Boudevilliers has an average of 134.1 days of rain or snow per year and on average receives 1,165 mm (45.9 in) of precipitation. The wettest month is December during which time Boudevilliers receives an average of 116 mm (4.6 in) of rain or snow. During this month there is precipitation for an average of 12.9 days. The month with the most days of precipitation is May, with an average of 13.1, but with only 93 mm (3.7 in) of rain or snow. The driest month of the year is April with an average of 78 mm (3.1 in) of precipitation over 11.2 days.

== Transportation ==
Val-de-Ruz has two railway stations, Les Hauts-Geneveys and Les Geneveys-sur-Coffrane. Both are located on the Neuchâtel–Le Locle-Col-des-Roches line, with frequent service to La Chaux-de-Fonds and Neuchâtel.
