= Les Geneveys-sur-Coffrane railway station =

Railway station in Val-de-Ruz, Switzerland

Les Geneveys-sur-Coffrane
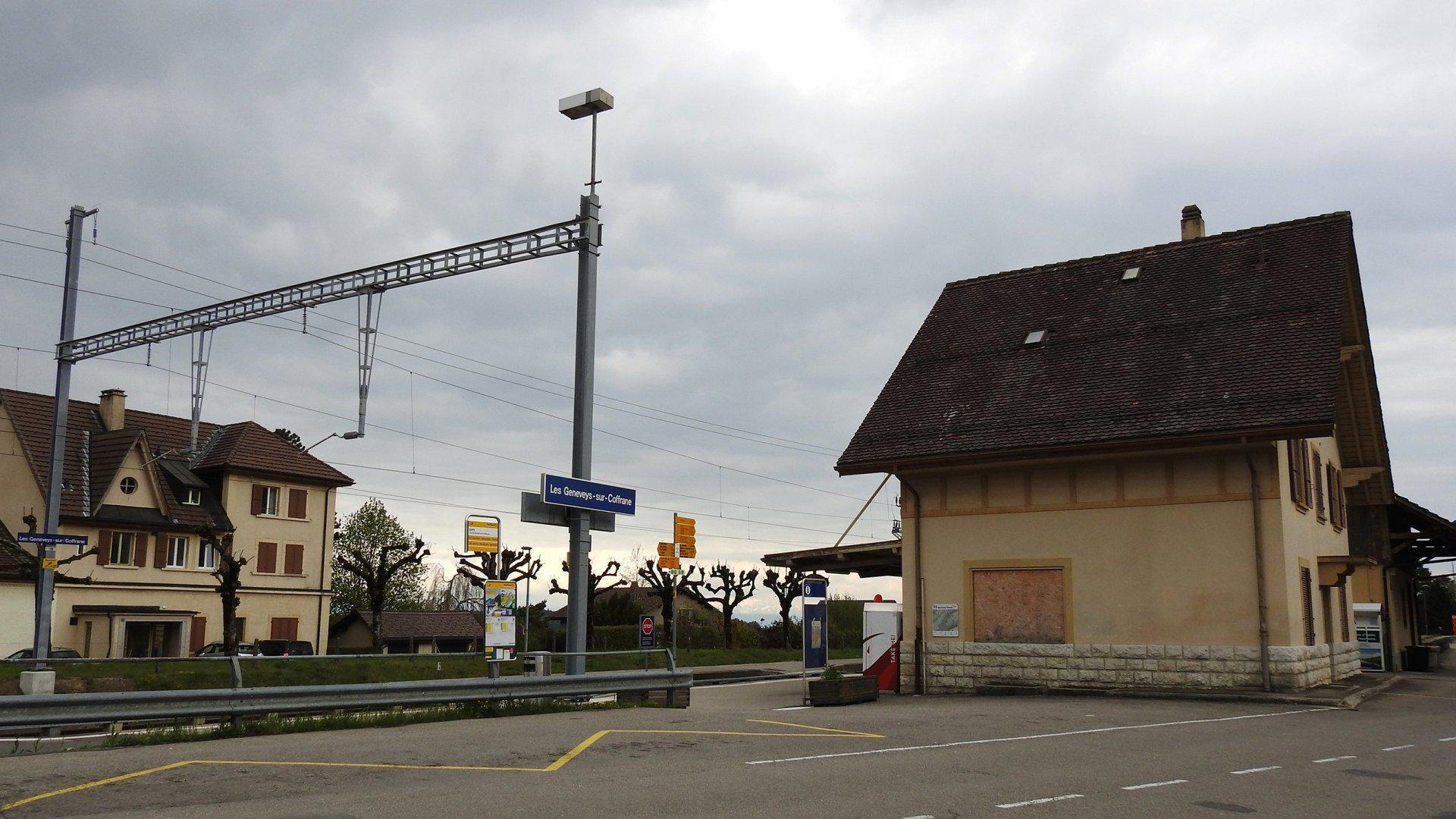
- The station in 2018

General information
- Location: Val-de-Ruz; Switzerland
- Coordinates: 47°00′54″N 6°51′12″E
- Elevation: 850 m (2,790 ft)
- Owner: Swiss Federal Railways
- Line: Neuchâtel–Le Locle-Col-des-Roches line
- Distance: 16.9 km (10.5 mi) from Neuchâtel
- Platforms: 2: 1 side platform; 1 island platform
- Tracks: 2
- Train operators: BLS AG; Swiss Federal Railways
- Connections: CarPostal SA bus line

Construction
- Parking: Yes (22 spaces)
- Cycle facilities: Yes (13 spaces)
- Accessible: Partly

Other information
- Station code: 8504236 (GEC)
- Fare zone: 30 (Onde Verte)

Passengers
- 2023: 920 per weekday (BLS, SBB)

Services
Preceding station	SBB CFF FFS	Following station
Chambrelien towards Neuchâtel	RE6	Les Hauts-Geneveys towards Le Locle
Preceding station	BLS	Following station
Chambrelien towards Bern	IR 66	Les Hauts-Geneveys towards La Chaux-de-Fonds
Location
- Location within Switzerland Location within Canton of Neuchâtel

Les Geneveys-sur-Coffrane railway station (French: Gare de Les Geneveys-sur-Coffrane) is a railway station in the municipality of Val-de-Ruz, in the Swiss canton of Neuchâtel. It is an intermediate stop on the standard gauge Neuchâtel–Le Locle-Col-des-Roches line of Swiss Federal Railways.

== Services ==
As of the December 2024 timetable change, the following services stop at Les Geneveys-sur-Coffrane:

- InterRegio/RegioExpress: hourly service between La Chaux-de-Fonds and Neuchâtel and hourly service to Le Locle and Bern.
