= Valangin Castle =

Castle in Valangin, Switzerland

Coordinates: 47°00′53″N 6°54′24″E

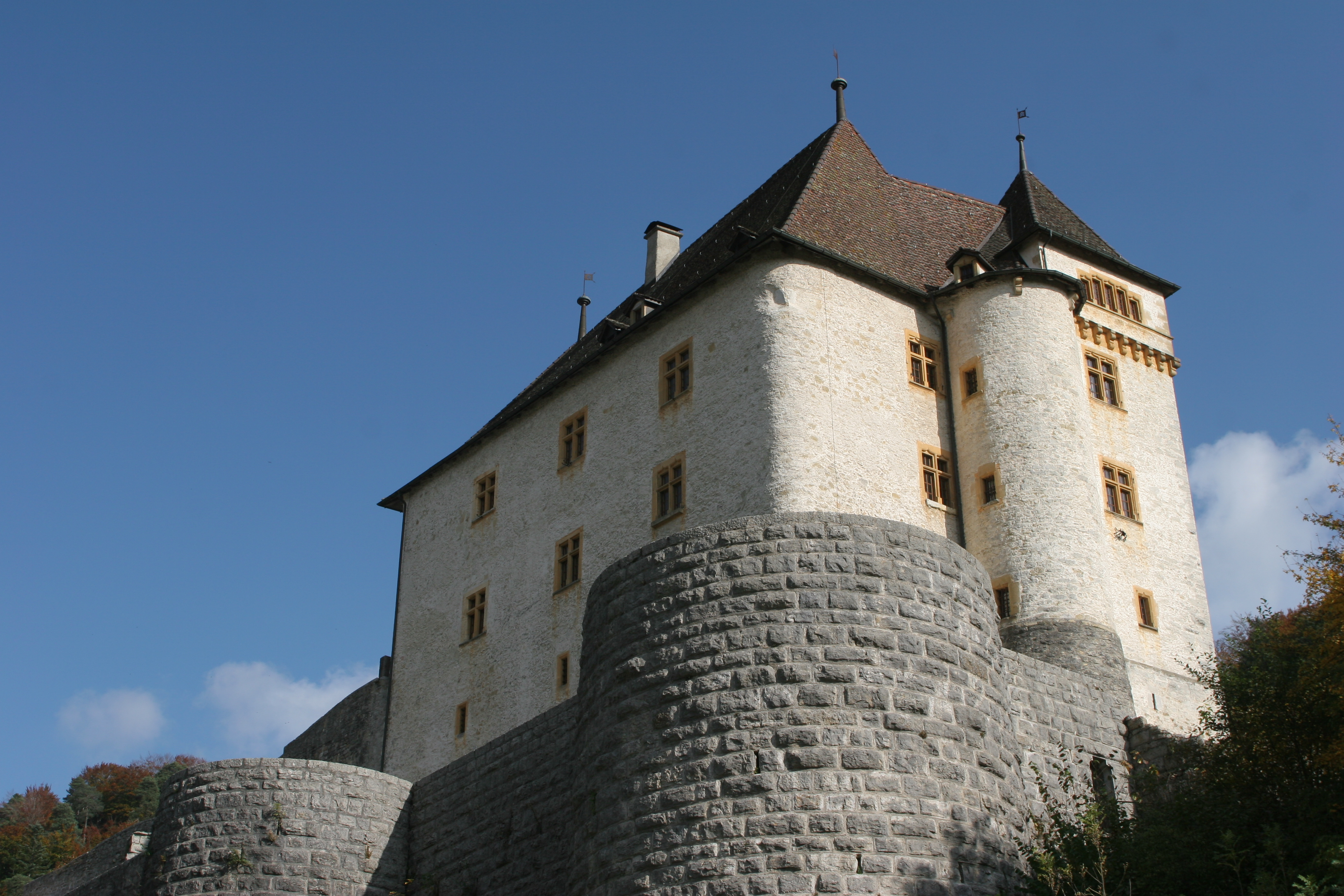
Valangin Castle

Valangin Castle is a castle in the municipality of Valangin of the Canton of Neuchâtel in Switzerland. It is a Swiss heritage site of national significance.

The Swiss patrician Katharina Franziska von Wattenwyl lived here after she was exiled from Bern for espionage.

== See also ==
- List of castles in Switzerland
- Château
