= Les Hauts-Geneveys railway station =

Railway station in Val-de-Ruz, Switzerland

Les Hauts-Geneveys
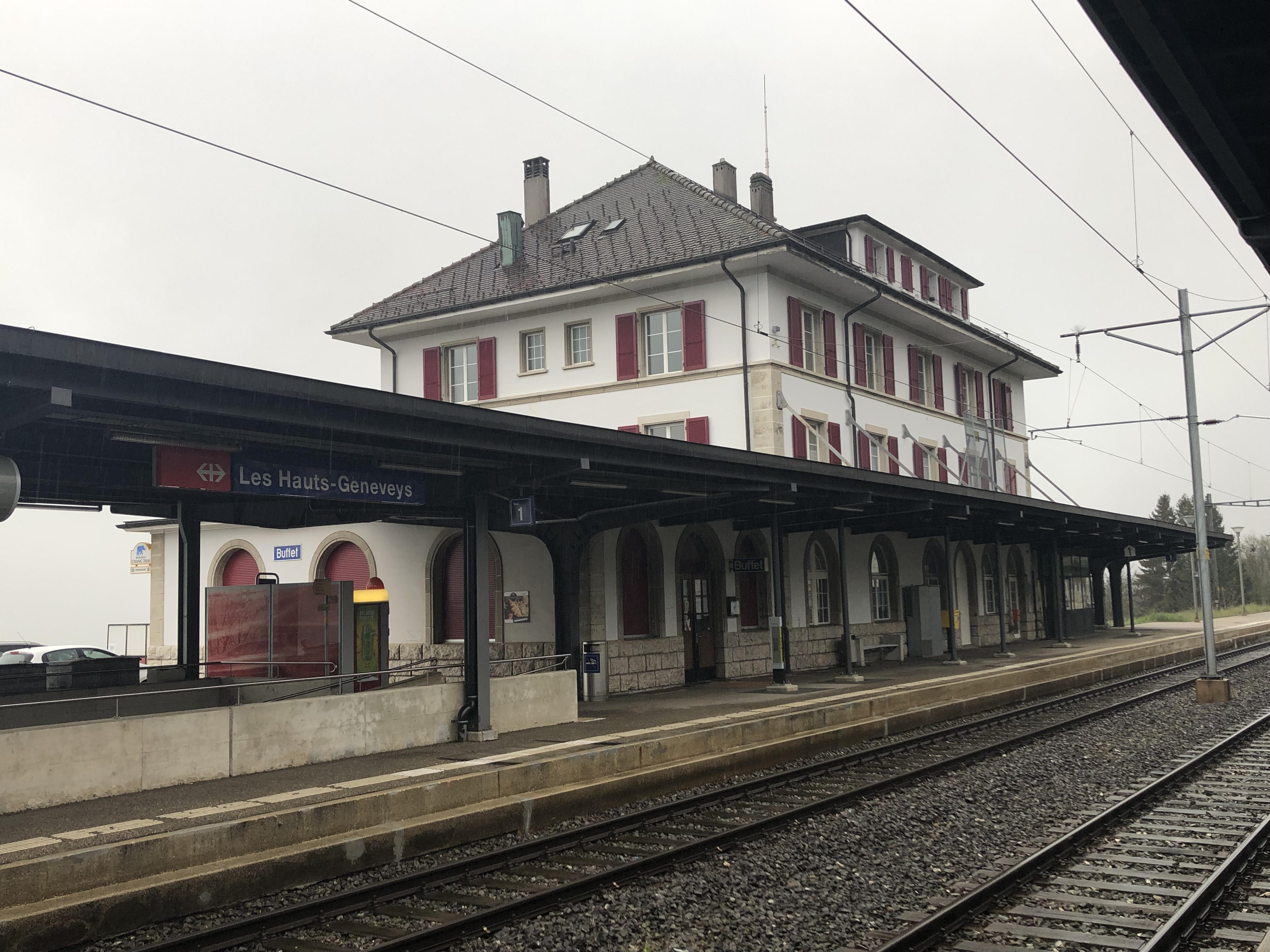
- The station in 2024

General information
- Location: Val-de-Ruz; Switzerland
- Coordinates: 47°02′50″N 6°52′29″E
- Elevation: 954 m (3,130 ft)
- Owner: Swiss Federal Railways
- Line: Neuchâtel–Le Locle-Col-des-Roches line
- Distance: 21.0 km (13.0 mi) from Neuchâtel
- Platforms: 2 side platforms
- Tracks: 2
- Train operators: BLS AG; Swiss Federal Railways
- Connections: Transports publics neuchâtelois bus line

Construction
- Parking: Yes (44 spaces)
- Cycle facilities: Yes (5 spaces)
- Accessible: Yes

Other information
- Station code: 8504237 (HGV)
- Fare zone: 30 (Onde Verte)

Passengers
- 2023: 1'300 per weekday (BLS, SBB)

Services
Preceding station	SBB CFF FFS	Following station
Les Geneveys-sur-Coffrane towards Neuchâtel	RE6	La Chaux-de-Fonds towards Le Locle
Preceding station	BLS	Following station
Les Geneveys-sur-Coffrane towards Bern	IR 66	La Chaux-de-Fonds Terminus
Location
- Location within Switzerland Location within Canton of Neuchâtel

Les Hauts-Geneveys railway station (French: Gare de Les Hauts-Geneveys) is a railway station in the municipality of Val-de-Ruz, in the Swiss canton of Neuchâtel. It is an intermediate stop on the standard gauge Neuchâtel–Le Locle-Col-des-Roches line of Swiss Federal Railways.

== Services ==
As of the December 2024 timetable change, the following services stop at Les Hauts-Geneveys:

- InterRegio/RegioExpress: hourly service between La Chaux-de-Fonds and Neuchâtel and hourly service to Le Locle and Bern.
