= Chambrelien railway station =

Railway station in Rochefort, Switzerland

Chambrelien
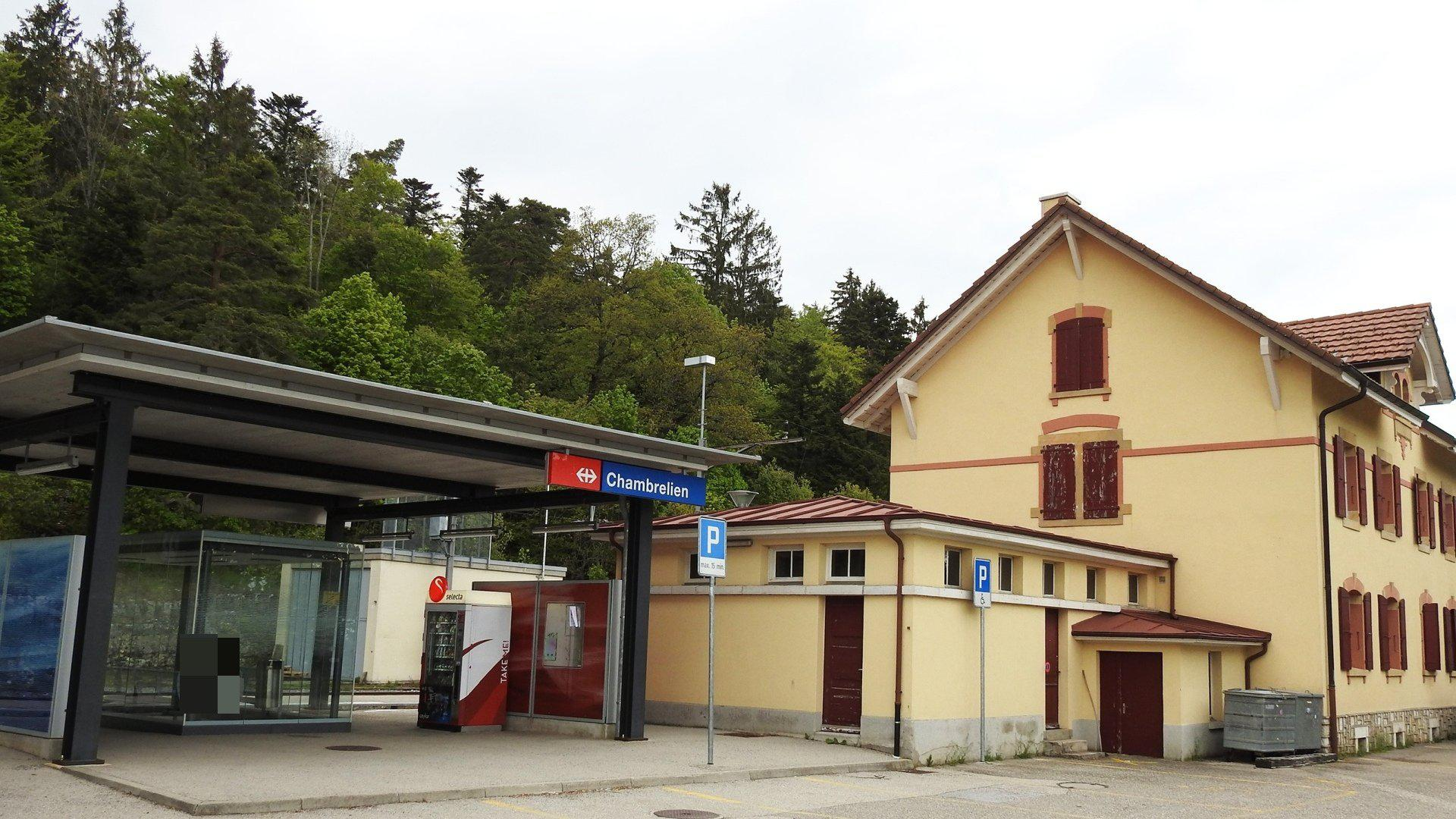
- The station in 2018

General information
- Location: Rochefort; Switzerland
- Coordinates: 46°58′02″N 6°48′44″E
- Elevation: 685 m (2,247 ft)
- Owner: Swiss Federal Railways
- Line: Neuchâtel–Le Locle-Col-des-Roches line
- Distance: 10.4 km (6.5 mi) from Neuchâtel
- Platforms: 1; 1 island platform; 1 side platform
- Tracks: 4
- Train operators: BLS AG; Swiss Federal Railways
- Connections: Transports publics neuchâtelois buses

Construction
- Parking: Yes (18 spaces)
- Cycle facilities: Yes (12 spaces)
- Accessible: No

Other information
- Station code: 8504234 (CHN)
- Fare zone: 10 and 30 (Onde Verte)

Passengers
- 2023: 810 per weekday (BLS, SBB)

Services
Preceding station	SBB CFF FFS	Following station
Reverses direction	RE6	Les Geneveys-sur-Coffrane towards Le Locle
Reverses direction	RE6	Neuchâtel Terminus
Preceding station	BLS	Following station
Reverses direction	IR 66	Les Geneveys-sur-Coffrane towards La Chaux-de-Fonds
Reverses direction	IR 66	Neuchâtel towards Bern
Location
- Location within Switzerland Location within Canton of Neuchâtel

Chambrelien railway station (French: Gare de Chambrelien) is a railway station in the municipality of Rochefort, in the Swiss canton of Neuchâtel. It is a reversing station on the standard gauge Neuchâtel–Le Locle-Col-des-Roches line of Swiss Federal Railways.

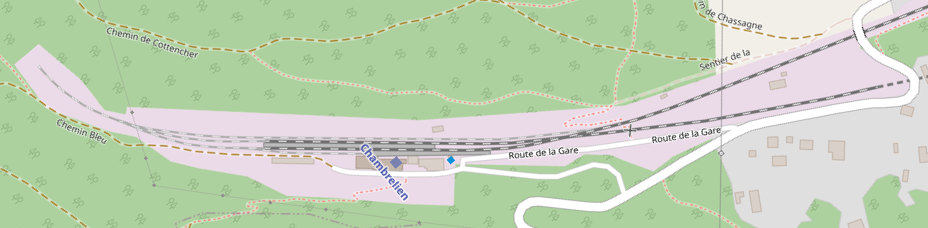
map of the station

== Services ==
As of the December 2024 timetable change, the following services stop at Chambrelien:

- InterRegio/RegioExpress: hourly service between La Chaux-de-Fonds and Neuchâtel and hourly service to Le Locle and Bern.

== Gallery ==
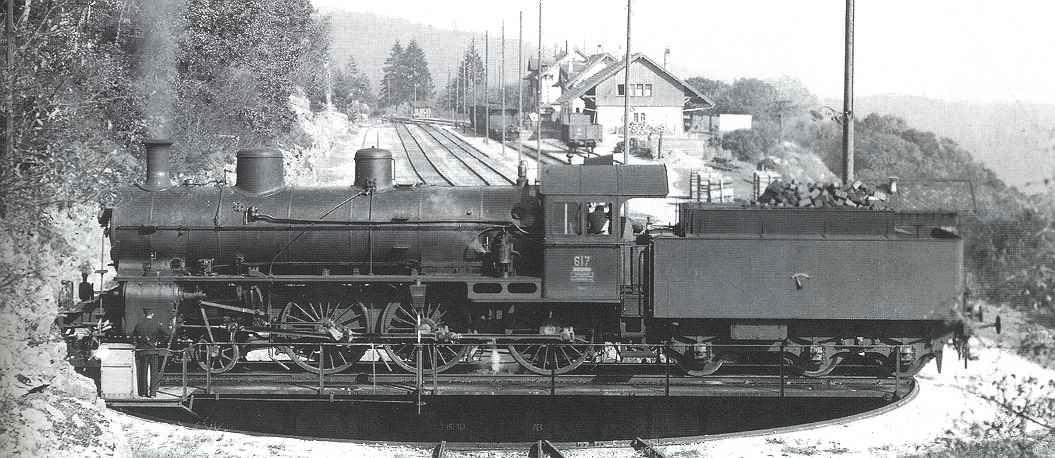
Turntable used in earlier times

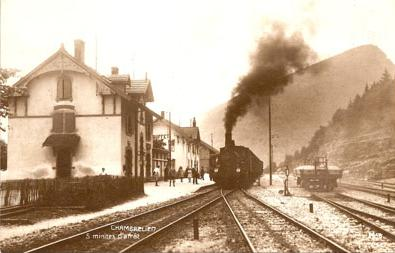
Station (1917)

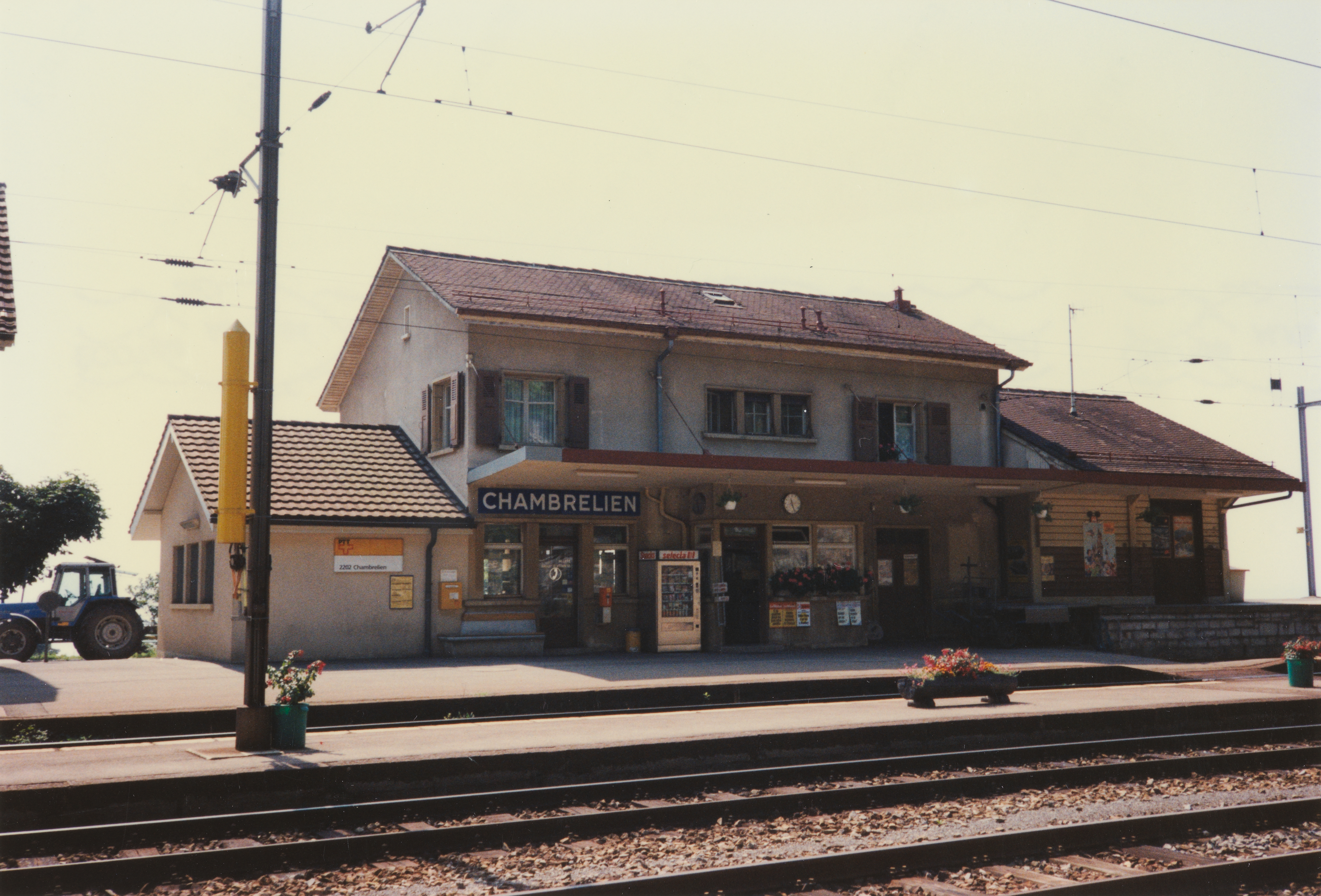
Station building (1994)

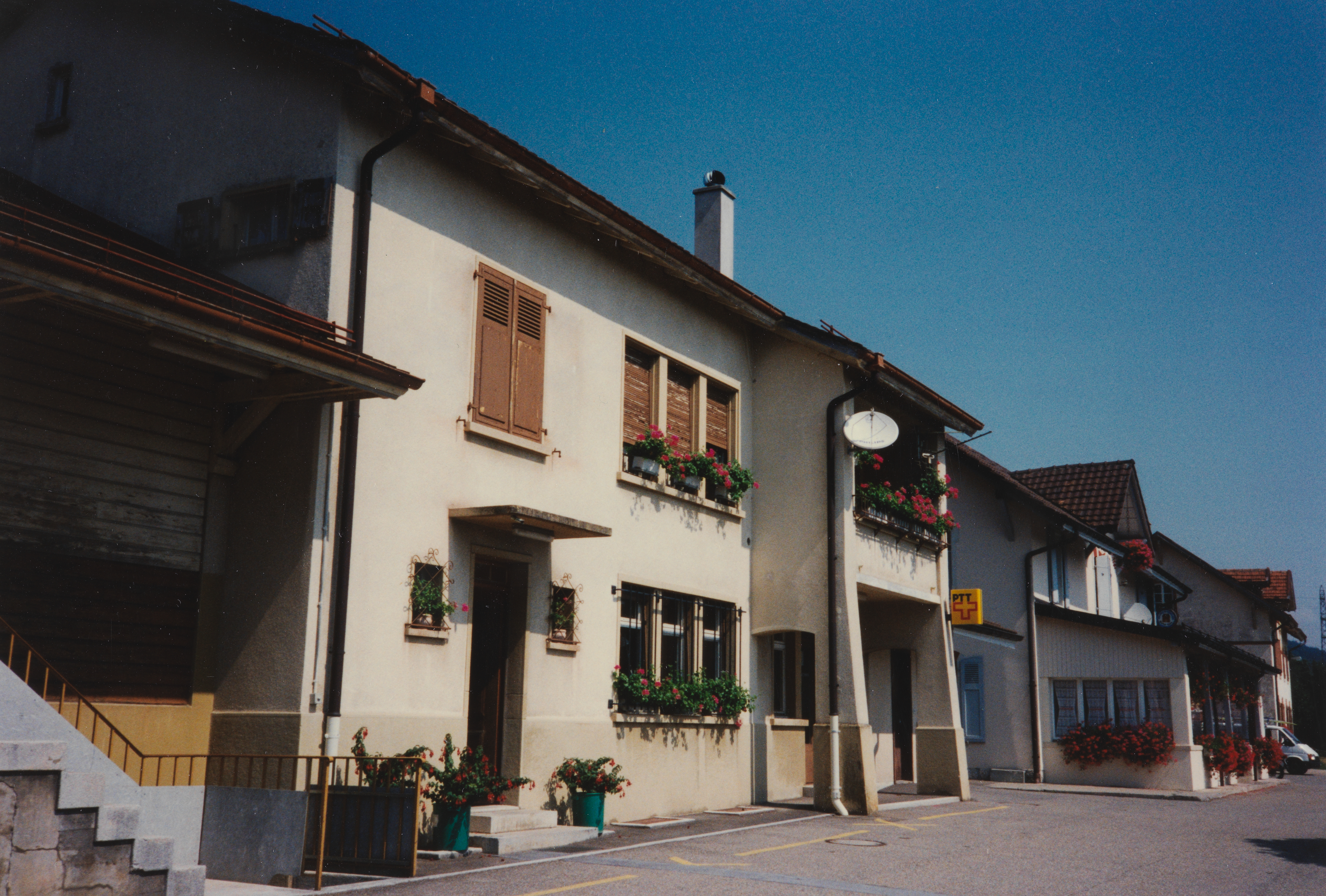
Street-side (1994)

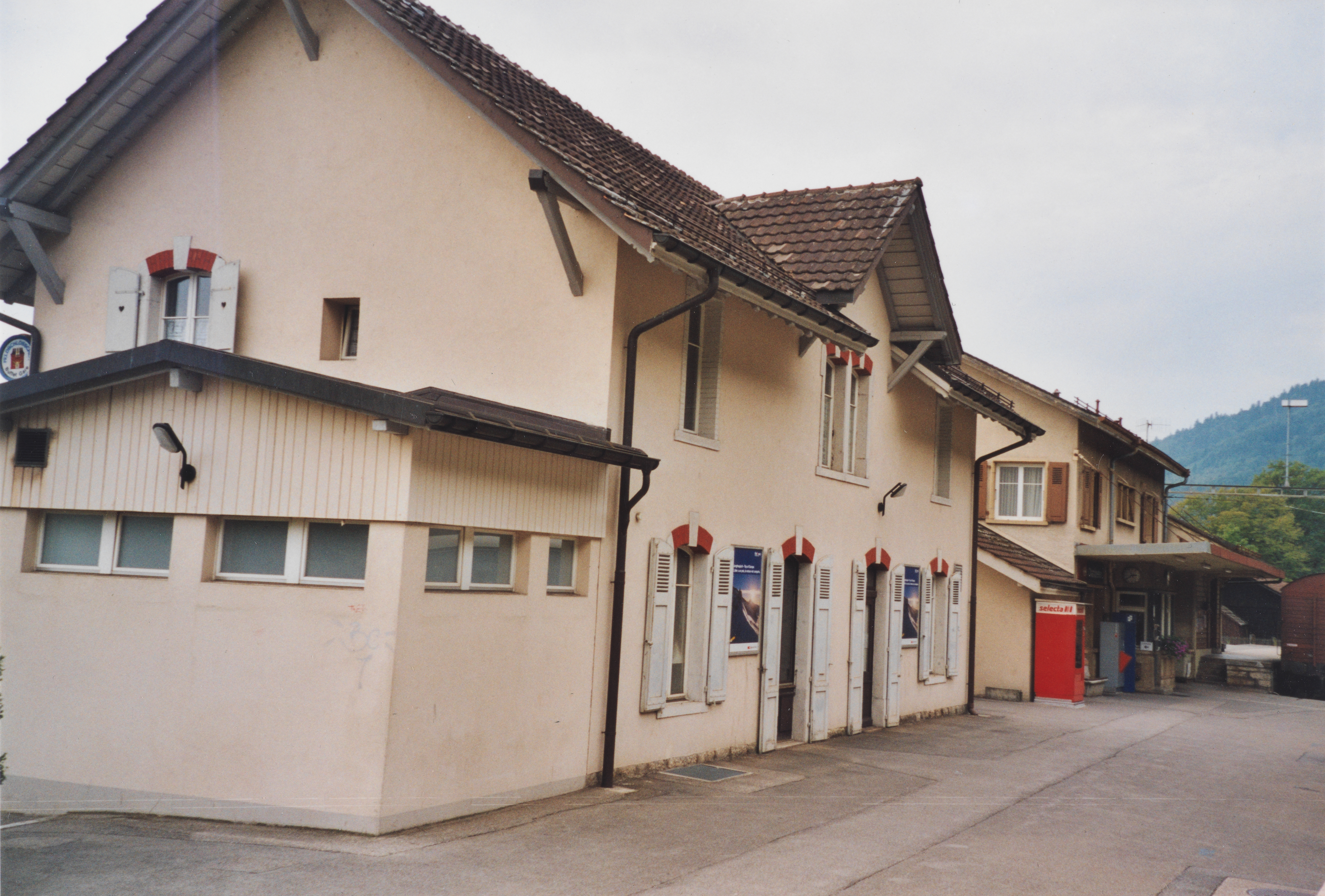
Restaurant and station buildings (2003)
