= Bonmont Abbey =

Coordinates: 46°24′10″N 6°08′57″E

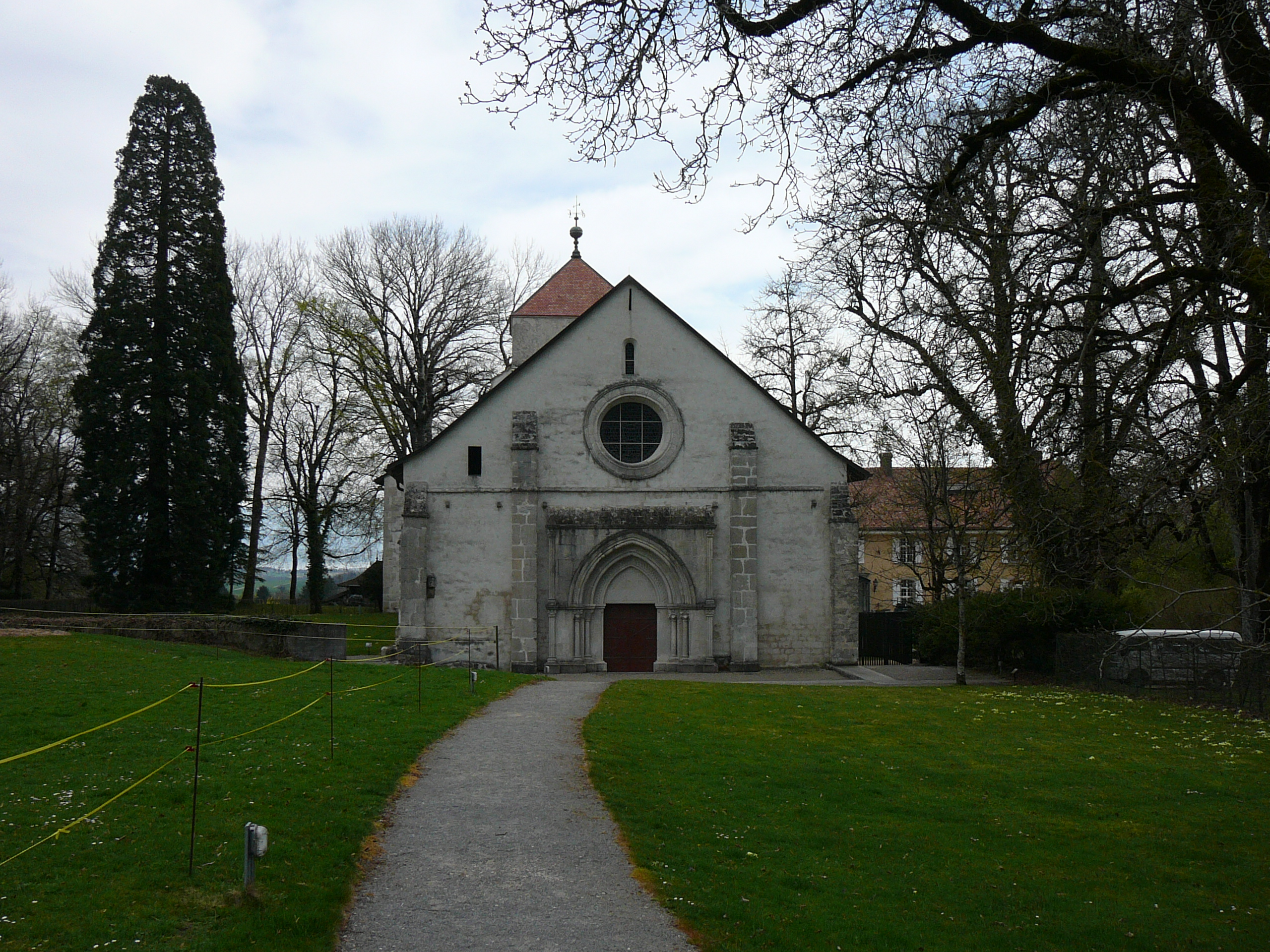
Bonmont Abbey

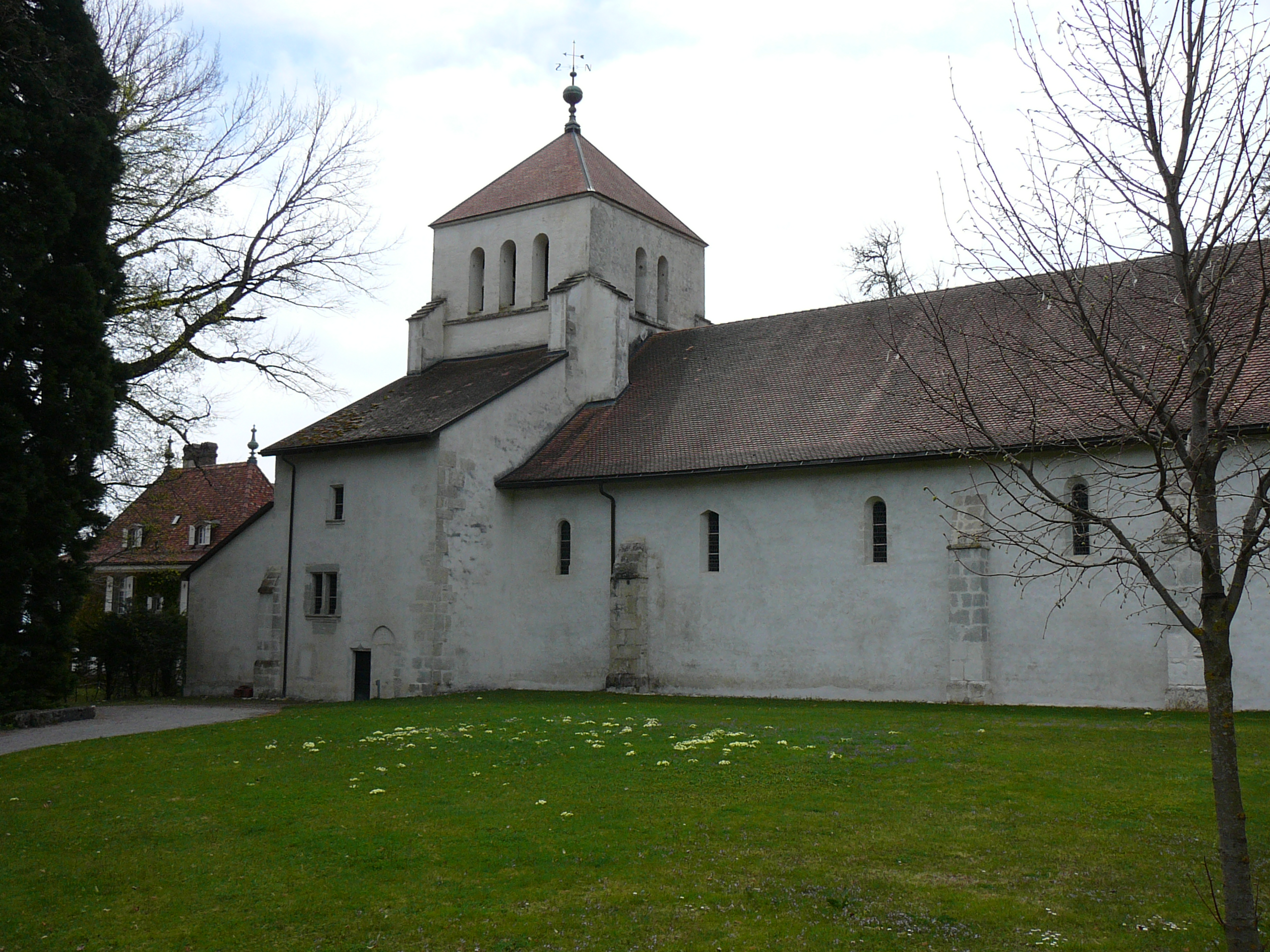
Side view of the abbey church

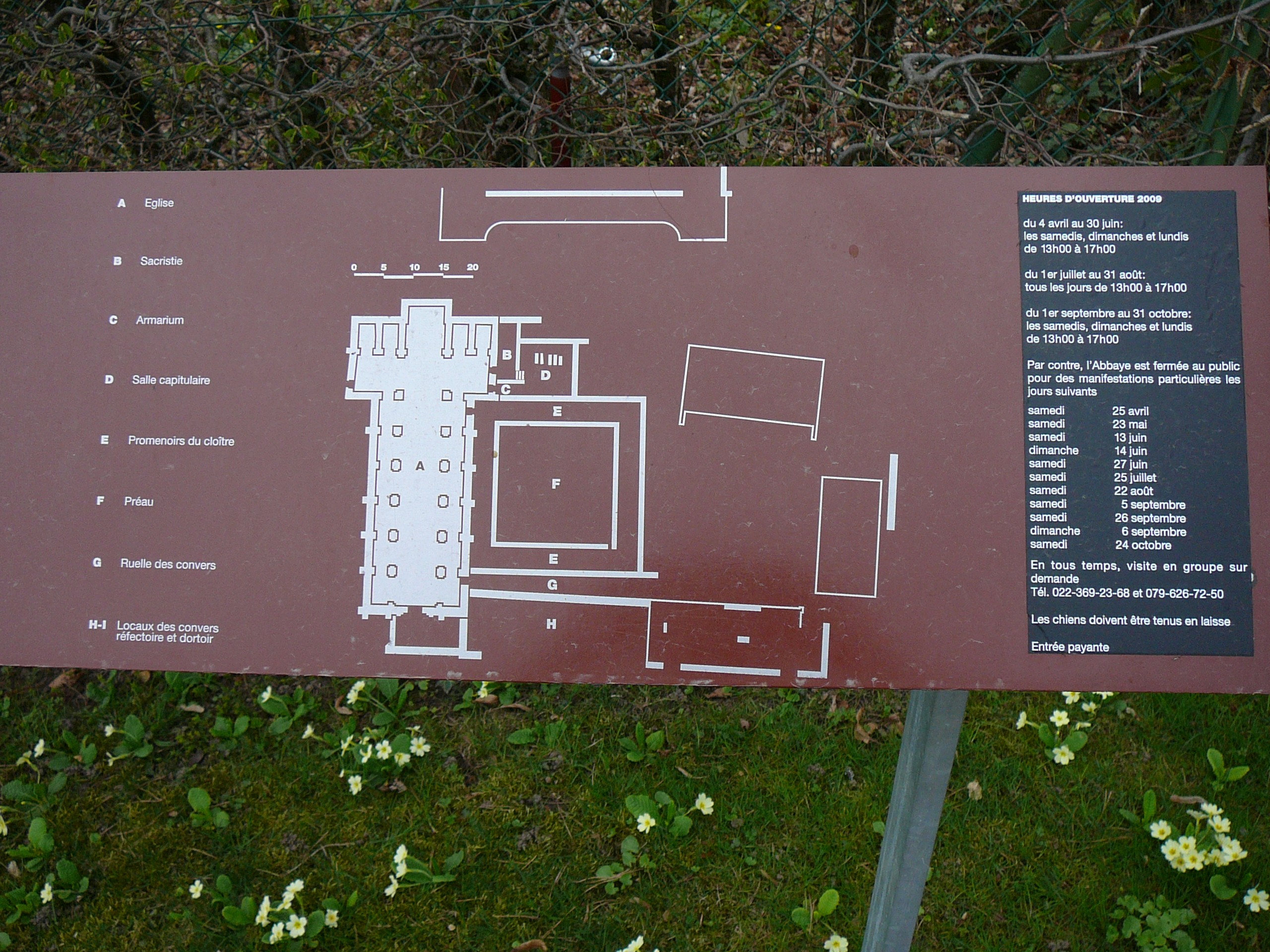
Plan of the abbey

Bonmont Abbey (French: Abbaye de Bonmont) is a former Cistercian monastery in the municipality of Chéserex in the canton of Vaud in Switzerland. It is a Swiss heritage site of national significance.

== History ==
The abbey was founded between 1110 and 1120. It was first mentioned in 1123 as monte de bono.

It was founded in the wake of the 11th century Benedictine reform movement. While the exact date and circumstances of the foundation are unknown, it was probably supported by the Savoy abbeys in the Vallée d'Aulps and in the French Jura Mountains. The oldest surviving document mentioning the abbey is a deed of gift from the lords of Divonne and Gingins in 1131. The deed mentions, without elaboration, the presence of a monastic community at Bonmont in 1123, and makes clear that in 1131, six years after a visit of Bernard of Clairvaux to the area, the monastery had joined the Cistercian Order.

In 1131, the foundation stone of the abbey church was laid. Construction continued until the end of the 12th century. The church was built during the transition from Romanesque to Gothic architecture and includes elements of both styles. The original architecture was kept simple and sober, according to the strict rules of the Benedictine Order and in accordance with the desires of the Cistercians. However, the simple design of the church and the simplicity of monastic life were quickly replaced by wealth. Numerous donations enlarged the possessions of the abbey and created ties between the monks and the local nobility. The area owned by the abbey stretched from the foot of the Jura to the Côte de Nyon and up to Aubonne. Under the protection of the House of Savoy in the 13th century, Bonmont Abbey was one of the richest monasteries in the Lake Geneva area.

As the worldly wealth of the abbey increased, the strict rules of the Cistercians loosened. From the 14th century the church was decorated in vibrant colors, ocher yellow or black floral motifs, and also paintings, in disregard of the old rule that churches interiors should be covered in white lime plaster only. There was also a significant structural change: in 1488 the humble roof turret was replaced by a massive tower over the transept.

With the conquest of Vaud by Bern and the Reformation the abbey was secularized in 1536. The monastic buildings were converted into agricultural ones or were demolished. The abbey church was converted for practical use: the wood flooring was torn up and used to create a wine warehouse on the ground floor and a granary above in the nave of the church. In the north transept, a cheese factory was established and in the south, a bakery. Just below the chancel arch there was room for a small chapel, which remained in operation. Because the church was put to secular use, it was saved from demolition. In 1761 the interior of the church was completely remodeled.

The old hospital of the abbey remained in operation after the dissolution of the monastery until 1672. It was replaced in 1736 with a castle that housed the bailiwick administrative office. Katharina Franziska von Wattenwyl, the daughter of the Bailiff of Bonmont, was born here. Following the Vaud Revolution in 1798, the abbey buildings became the property of the state, falling into private ownership in 1802. In 1820 the church was dramatically transformed. Two new entrances, one with a pointed arch and the other with a rounded arch, were built into the fifth bay of the southern side of the nave and the second bay of the northern side. Above the bakery a two-story residence was added.

In 1942 the church was declared a National Monument. In 1982 it became the property of the Canton of Vaud, which carried out a thorough restoration that ended in 1995. The Bernese bailiwick castle and the castle grounds are still privately owned.
