= Chéserex =

- Municipality
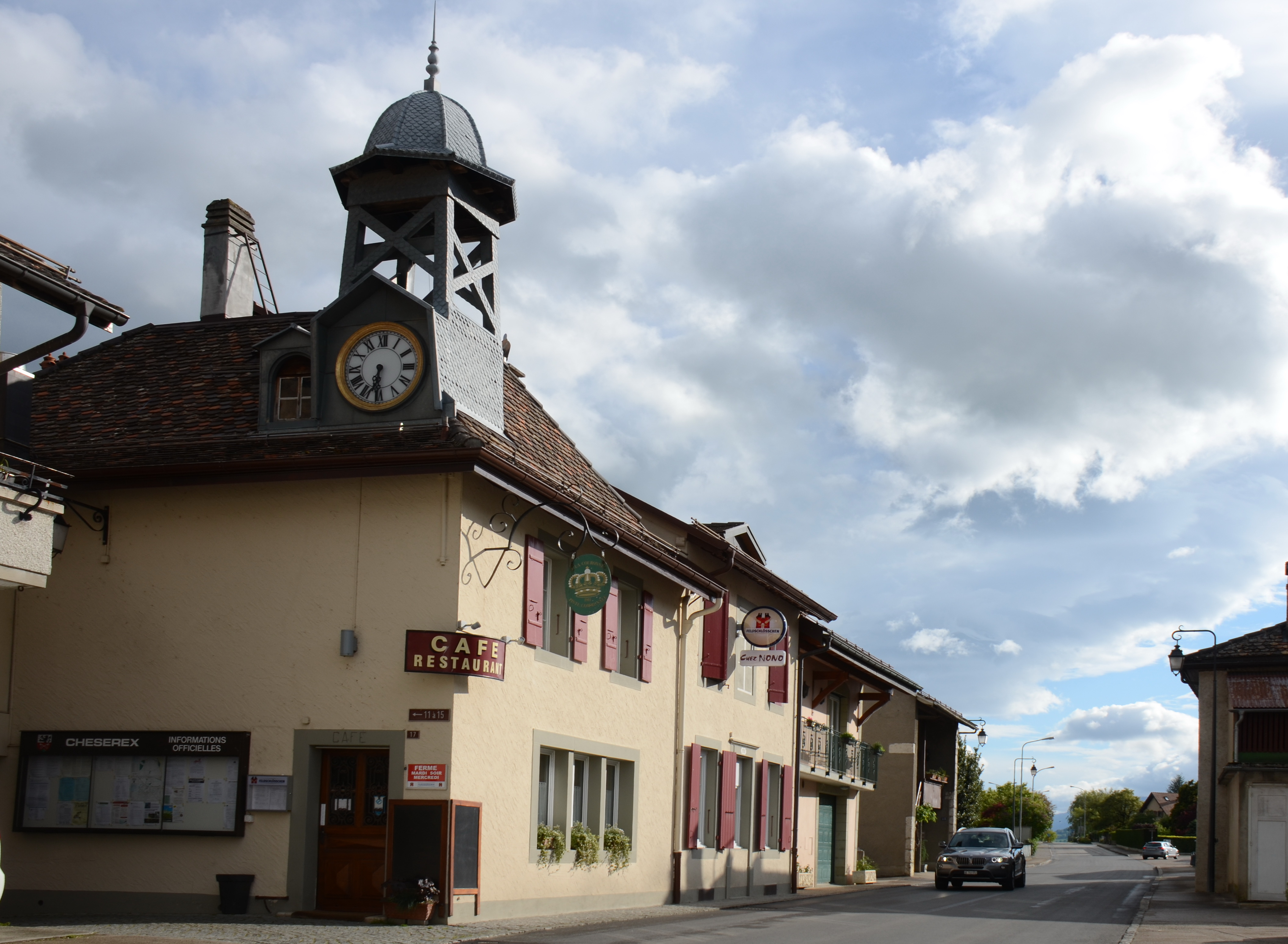

- Flag Coat of arms
- Location of Chéserex
- Location within Switzerland Location within Canton of Vaud
- Coordinates: 46°25′N 6°10′E
- Country: Switzerland
- Canton: Vaud
- District: Nyon

Government
  - Mayor: Syndic

Area
  - Total: 10.60 km^{2} (4.09 sq mi)
- Elevation: 530 m (1,740 ft)

Population (2003)
  - Total: 1,121
  - Density: 105.8/km^{2} (273.9/sq mi)
- Time zone: UTC+01:00 (CET)
  - Summer (DST): UTC+02:00 (CEST)
- Postal code: 1275
- SFOS number: 5709
- ISO 3166 code: CH-VD
- Surrounded by: Borex, Crassier, Gingins, Grens, La Rippe
- Website: www.cheserex.ch

Chéserex (French pronunciation: [ʃez(ə)ʁɛ]) is a municipality in the district of Nyon in the canton of Vaud in Switzerland.

== History ==
Chéserex is first mentioned around 1001-25 as Chiseras.

== Geography ==
Chéserex has an area, as of 2009, of 10.6 square kilometers (4.1 mi^{2}). Of this area, 3.8 km^{2} (1.5 mi^{2}) or 36.0% is used for agricultural purposes, while 5.26 km^{2} (2.03 mi^{2}) or 49.8% is forested. Of the rest of the land, 1.34 km^{2} (0.52 mi^{2}) or 12.7% is settled (buildings or roads) and 0.16 km^{2} (0.062 mi^{2}) or 1.5% is unproductive land.

Of the built up area, housing and buildings made up 3.5% and transportation infrastructure made up 3.7%. while parks, green belts and sports fields made up 5.2%. Out of the forested land, 48.7% of the total land area is heavily forested and 1.1% is covered with orchards or small clusters of trees. Of the agricultural land, 26.8% is used for growing crops and 2.7% is pastures and 6.3% is used for alpine pastures.

The municipality was part of the Nyon District until it was dissolved on 31 August 2006, and Chéserex became part of the new district of Nyon.

The municipality is located at the foot of the Jura Mountains. It consists of the village of Chéserex, the former Bonmont Abbey and the La Florettaz settlement.

== Coat of arms ==
The blazon of the municipal coat of arms is Per fess, 1. Argent, seme of billets Sable, semi-lion Sable langued Gules; 2. Gules, in base a Coupeaux Vert, two Keys saltirewise Argent.

== Demographics ==
Chéserex has a population (as of December 2020) of 1,249. As of 2008, 23.6% of the population are resident foreign nationals. Over the last 10 years (1999–2009 ) the population has changed at a rate of 21.6%. It has changed at a rate of 12.6% due to migration and at a rate of 10.1% due to births and deaths.

Most of the population (as of 2000) speaks French (828 or 79.4%), with German being second most common (83 or 8.0%) and English being third (69 or 6.6%). There are 10 people who speak Italian and 3 people who speak Romansh.

The age distribution, as of 2009, in Chéserex is; 138 children or 11.4% of the population are between 0 and 9 years old and 168 teenagers or 13.8% are between 10 and 19. Of the adult population, 118 people or 9.7% of the population are between 20 and 29 years old. 157 people or 12.9% are between 30 and 39, 243 people or 20.0% are between 40 and 49, and 171 people or 14.1% are between 50 and 59. The senior population distribution is 142 people or 11.7% of the population are between 60 and 69 years old, 56 people or 4.6% are between 70 and 79, there are 20 people or 1.6% who are between 80 and 89, and there are 2 people or 0.2% who are 90 and older.

As of 2000, there were 437 people who were single and never married in the municipality. There were 505 married individuals, 35 widows or widowers and 66 individuals who are divorced.

As of 2000, there were 424 private households in the municipality, and an average of 2.4 persons per household. There were 118 households that consist of only one person and 26 households with five or more people. Out of a total of 434 households that answered this question, 27.2% were households made up of just one person and there was 1 adult who lived with their parents. Of the rest of the households, there are 121 married couples without children, 155 married couples with children. There were 27 single parents with a child or children. There were 2 households that were made up of unrelated people and 10 households that were made up of some sort of institution or another collective housing.

In 2000 there were 186 single family homes (or 68.9% of the total) out of a total of 270 inhabited buildings. There were 50 multi-family buildings (18.5%), along with 20 multi-purpose buildings that were mostly used for housing (7.4%) and 14 other use buildings (commercial or industrial) that also had some housing (5.2%).

In 2000, a total of 397 apartments (86.7% of the total) were permanently occupied, while 48 apartments (10.5%) were seasonally occupied and 13 apartments (2.8%) were empty. As of 2009, the construction rate of new housing units was 5.7 new units per 1000 residents. The vacancy rate for the municipality, in 2010, was 0.37%.

The historical population is given in the following chart:

== Heritage sites of national significance ==
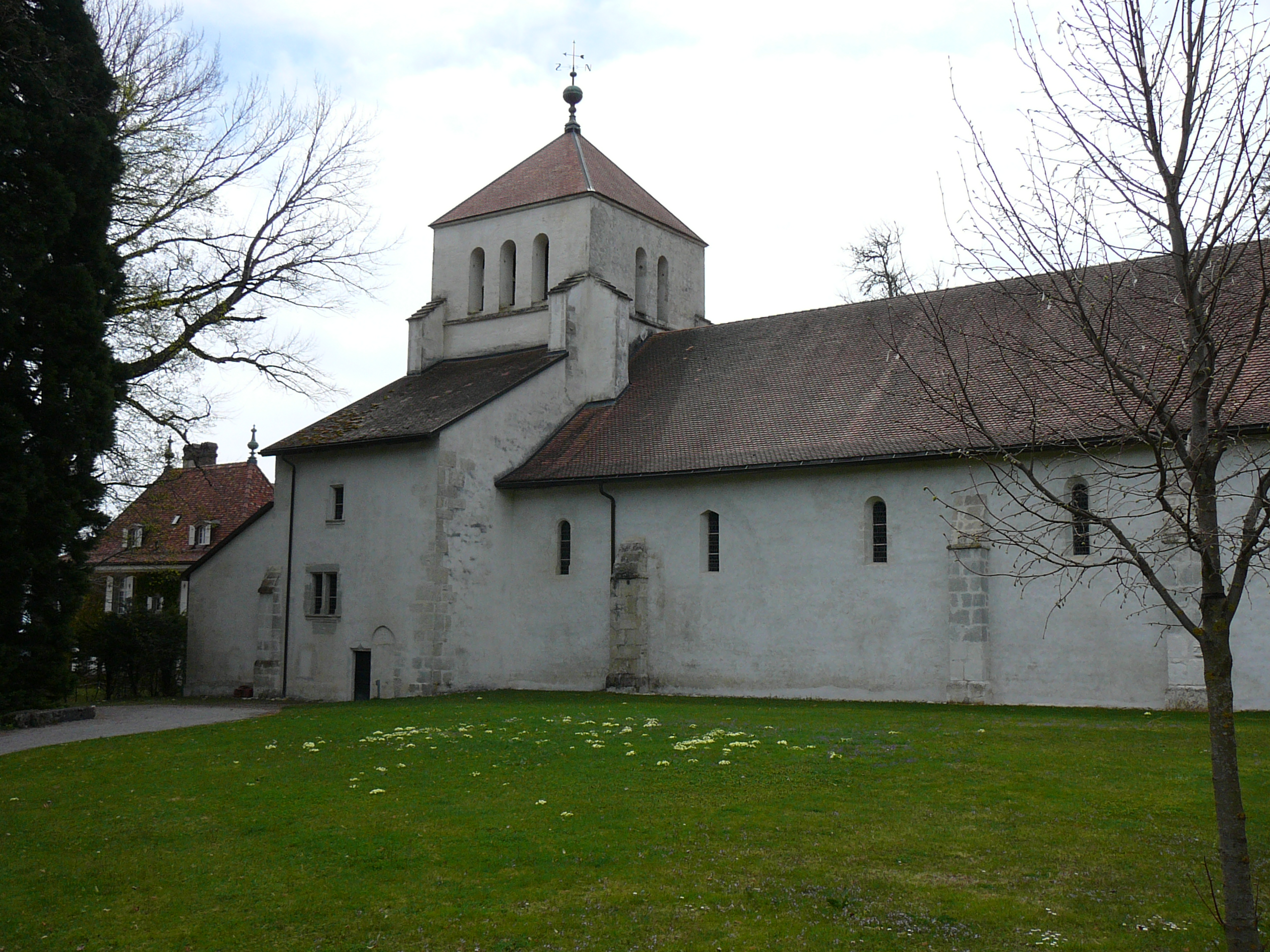
Church of Bonmont Abbey

The Church of the Old Bonmont Abbey is listed as a Swiss heritage site of national significance.

== Politics ==
In the 2007 federal election the most popular party was the SVP which received 23.48% of the vote. The next three most popular parties were the Green Party (16.26%), the LPS Party (14.09%) and the FDP (13.93%). In the federal election, a total of 329 votes were cast, and the voter turnout was 47.1%.

== Economy ==
As of 2010, Chéserex had an unemployment rate of 3.3%. As of 2008, there were 24 people employed in the primary economic sector and about 9 businesses involved in this sector. 19 people were employed in the secondary sector and there were 7 businesses in this sector. 112 people were employed in the tertiary sector, with 18 businesses in this sector. There were 564 residents of the municipality who were employed in some capacity, of which females made up 42.6% of the workforce.

In 2008 the total number of full-time equivalent jobs was 131. The number of jobs in the primary sector was 15, all of which were in agriculture. The number of jobs in the secondary sector was 17 of which 1 was in manufacturing and 16 (94.1%) were in construction. The number of jobs in the tertiary sector was 99. In the tertiary sector; 10 or 10.1% were in wholesale or retail sales or the repair of motor vehicles, 36 or 36.4% were in a hotel or restaurant, 1 was in the information industry, 6 or 6.1% were technical professionals or scientists, 6 or 6.1% were in education.

In 2000, there were 101 workers who commuted into the municipality and 472 workers who commuted away. The municipality is a net exporter of workers, with about 4.7 workers leaving the municipality for every one entering. About 15.8% of the workforce coming into Chéserex are coming from outside Switzerland. Of the working population, 11.7% used public transportation to get to work, and 75% used a private car.

== Religion ==
From the 2000 census, 342 or 32.8% were Roman Catholic, while 411 or 39.4% belonged to the Swiss Reformed Church. Of the rest of the population, there were 7 members of an Orthodox church (or about 0.67% of the population), there was 1 individual who belongs to the Christian Catholic Church, and there were 52 individuals (or about 4.99% of the population) who belonged to another Christian church. There were 2 individuals (or about 0.19% of the population) who were Jewish, and 5 (or about 0.48% of the population) who were Islamic. There were 2 individuals who were Buddhist and 4 individuals who belonged to another church. 204 (or about 19.56% of the population) belonged to no church, are agnostic or atheist, and 34 individuals (or about 3.26% of the population) did not answer the question.

== Weather ==
Chéserex has an average of 126.9 days of rain or snow per year and on average receives 1,289 mm (50.7 in) of precipitation. The wettest month is December during which time Chéserex receives an average of 148 mm (5.8 in) of rain or snow. During this month there is precipitation for an average of 11.1 days. The month with the most days of precipitation is May, with an average of 12.8, but with only 95 mm (3.7 in) of rain or snow. The driest month of the year is July with an average of 75 mm (3.0 in) of precipitation over 8.8 days.

== Education ==
In Chéserex about 391 or (37.5%) of the population have completed non-mandatory upper secondary education, and 249 or (23.9%) have completed additional higher education (either university or a Fachhochschule). Of the 249 who completed tertiary schooling, 43.4% were Swiss men, 22.1% were Swiss women, 18.5% were non-Swiss men and 16.1% were non-Swiss women.

In the 2009/2010 school year there were a total of 156 students in the Chéserex school district. In the Vaud cantonal school system, two years of non-obligatory pre-school are provided by the political districts. During the school year, the political district provided pre-school care for a total of 1,249 children of which 563 children (45.1%) received subsidized pre-school care. The canton's primary school program requires students to attend for four years. There were 75 students in the municipal primary school program. The obligatory lower secondary school program lasts for six years and there were 79 students in those schools. There were also 2 students who were home schooled or attended another non-traditional school.

As of 2000, there were 10 students in Chéserex who came from another municipality, while 153 residents attended schools outside the municipality.
