= Valangin =

- Former municipality
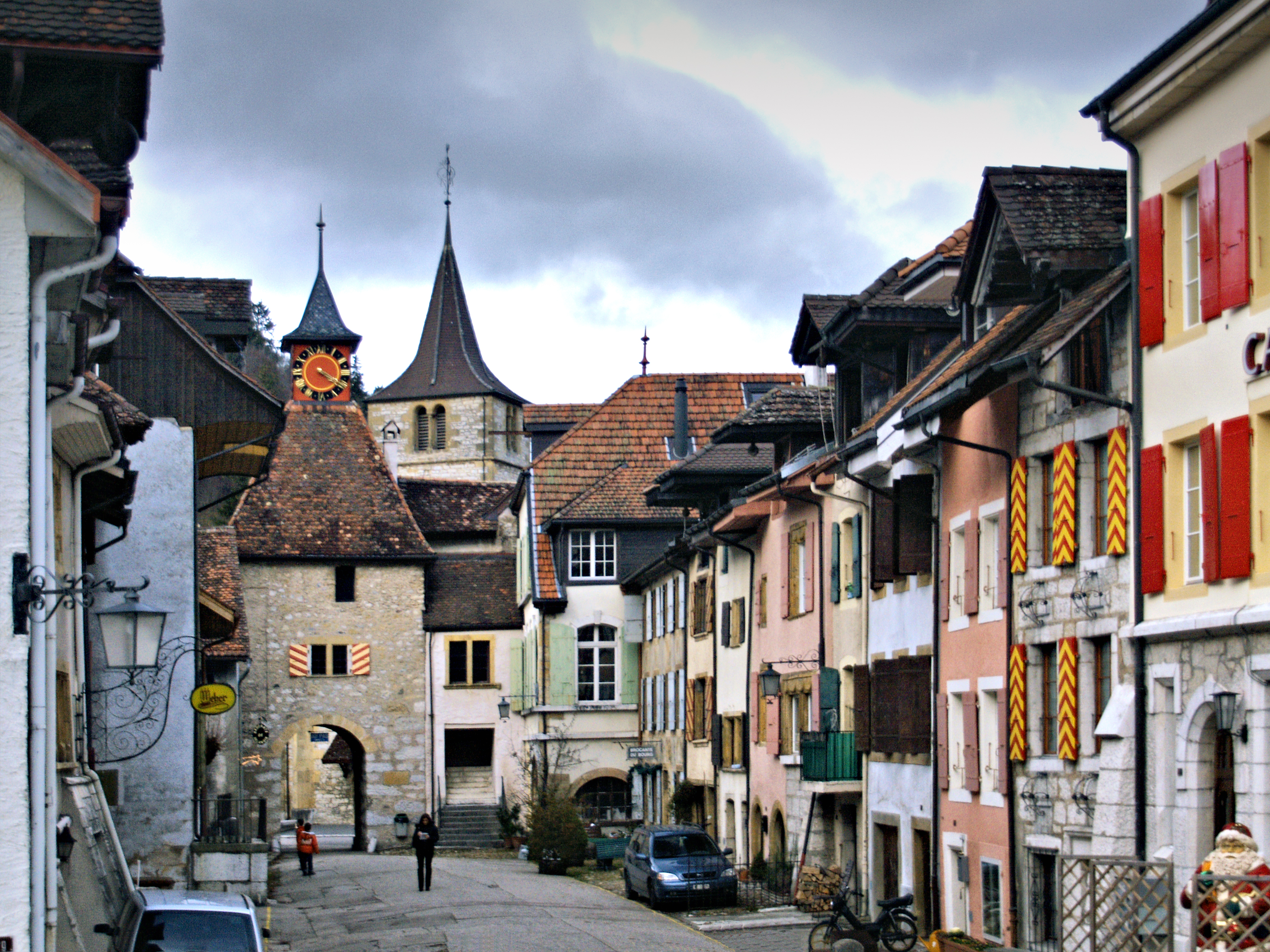
- Valangin old city

- Flag Coat of arms
- Location of Valangin
- Location within Switzerland Location within Canton of Neuchâtel
- Coordinates: 47°1′N 6°54′E
- Country: Switzerland
- Canton: Neuchâtel
- District: Val-de-Ruz

Area
  - Total: 3.77 km^{2} (1.46 sq mi)
- Elevation: 651 m (2,136 ft)

Population (December 2019)
  - Total: 507
  - Density: 134/km^{2} (348/sq mi)
- Time zone: UTC+01:00 (CET)
  - Summer (DST): UTC+02:00 (CEST)
- Postal code: 2042
- SFOS number: 6485
- ISO 3166 code: CH-NE
- Surrounded by: Val-de-Ruz, Neuchâtel
- Website: valangin.ch

Valangin (French pronunciation: [valɑ̃ʒɛ̃]) is a former municipality in the district of Val-de-Ruz in the canton of Neuchâtel in Switzerland. On 1 January 2021 the former municipalities of Corcelles-Cormondrèche, Peseux and Valangin merged into the municipality of Neuchâtel.

== History ==
Valangin is first mentioned in 1241 as de Valengiz.

== Geography ==
Aerial view from 1500 m by Walter Mittelholzer (1927)

Valangin had an area, as of 2009, of 3.8 square kilometers (1.5 mi^{2}). Of this area, 1.48 km^{2} (0.57 mi^{2}) or 39.4% is used for agricultural purposes, while 1.87 km^{2} (0.72 mi^{2}) or 49.7% is forested. Of the rest of the land, 0.34 km^{2} (0.13 mi^{2}) or 9.0% is settled (buildings or roads), 0.01 km^{2} (2.5 acres) or 0.3% is either rivers or lakes.

Of the built up area, housing and buildings made up 2.4% and transportation infrastructure made up 5.3%. Out of the forested land, 46.8% of the total land area is heavily forested and 2.9% is covered with orchards or small clusters of trees. Of the agricultural land, 22.3% is used for growing crops and 17.0% is pastures. All the water in the municipality is flowing water.

The former municipality is located at the northern entrance of the Seyon canyon. It consists of the village of Valangin, the hamlet of La Borcaderie and the agricultural areas of Bussy and Sorgereux.

The Valanginian Age of the Cretaceous Period of geological time is named for Valangin.

== Coat of arms ==
The blazon of the municipal coat of arms is Gules, on a pale Or three Chevrons Sable.

== Demographics ==
Valangin had a population (as of 2019) of 507. As of 2008, 22.4% of the population are resident foreign nationals. Over the last 10 years (2000–2010) the population has changed at a rate of 1.7%. It has changed at a rate of -5.4% due to migration and at a rate of 7.3% due to births and deaths.

Most of the population (as of 2000) speaks French (348 or 87.0%) as their first language, Portuguese is the second most common (22 or 5.5%) and German is the third (14 or 3.5%). There are 10 people who speak Italian.

As of 2008, the population was 52.0% male and 48.0% female. The population was made up of 163 Swiss men (39.8% of the population) and 50 (12.2%) non-Swiss men. There were 156 Swiss women (38.0%) and 41 (10.0%) non-Swiss women. Of the population in the municipality, 104 or about 26.0% were born in Valangin and lived there in 2000. There were 141 or 35.3% who were born in the same canton, while 73 or 18.3% were born somewhere else in Switzerland, and 69 or 17.3% were born outside of Switzerland.

As of 2000, children and teenagers (0–19 years old) make up 21.5% of the population, while adults (20–64 years old) make up 62.3% and seniors (over 64 years old) make up 16.3%.

As of 2000, there were 164 people who were single and never married in the municipality. There were 201 married individuals, 20 widows or widowers and 15 individuals who are divorced.

As of 2000, there were 167 private households in the municipality, and an average of 2.3 persons per household. There were 55 households that consist of only one person and 9 households with five or more people. In 2000, a total of 165 apartments (92.7% of the total) were permanently occupied, while 8 apartments (4.5%) were seasonally occupied and 5 apartments (2.8%) were empty.

The historical population is given in the following chart:

== Notable people ==
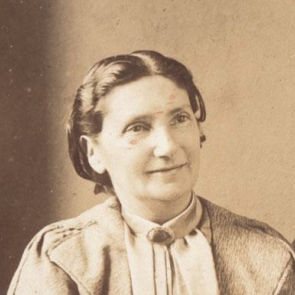
Rosa Ramseyer

- Rosa Ramseyer (1841 in Valangin – 1906) wife of Basel missionary to Ghana Fritz Ramseyer
- Robert Comtesse (1847 in Valangin – 1922) a Swiss politician, member of the Swiss Federal Council 1899-1912
- Edmond Bille (1878 in Valangin – 1959) a Swiss artist, painter, engraver, stained glass artist, journalist, writer and politician
- Jean-François Balmer (born 1946 in Valangin) a Swiss actor, works in French cinema, television and stage productions

== Heritage sites of national significance ==
Valangin Castle and the Collégiale (Collegiate church) are listed as Swiss heritage site of national significance. The small city of Valangin, the Bussy/Le Sorgereux region and the La Borcarderie region are all part of the Inventory of Swiss Heritage Sites.

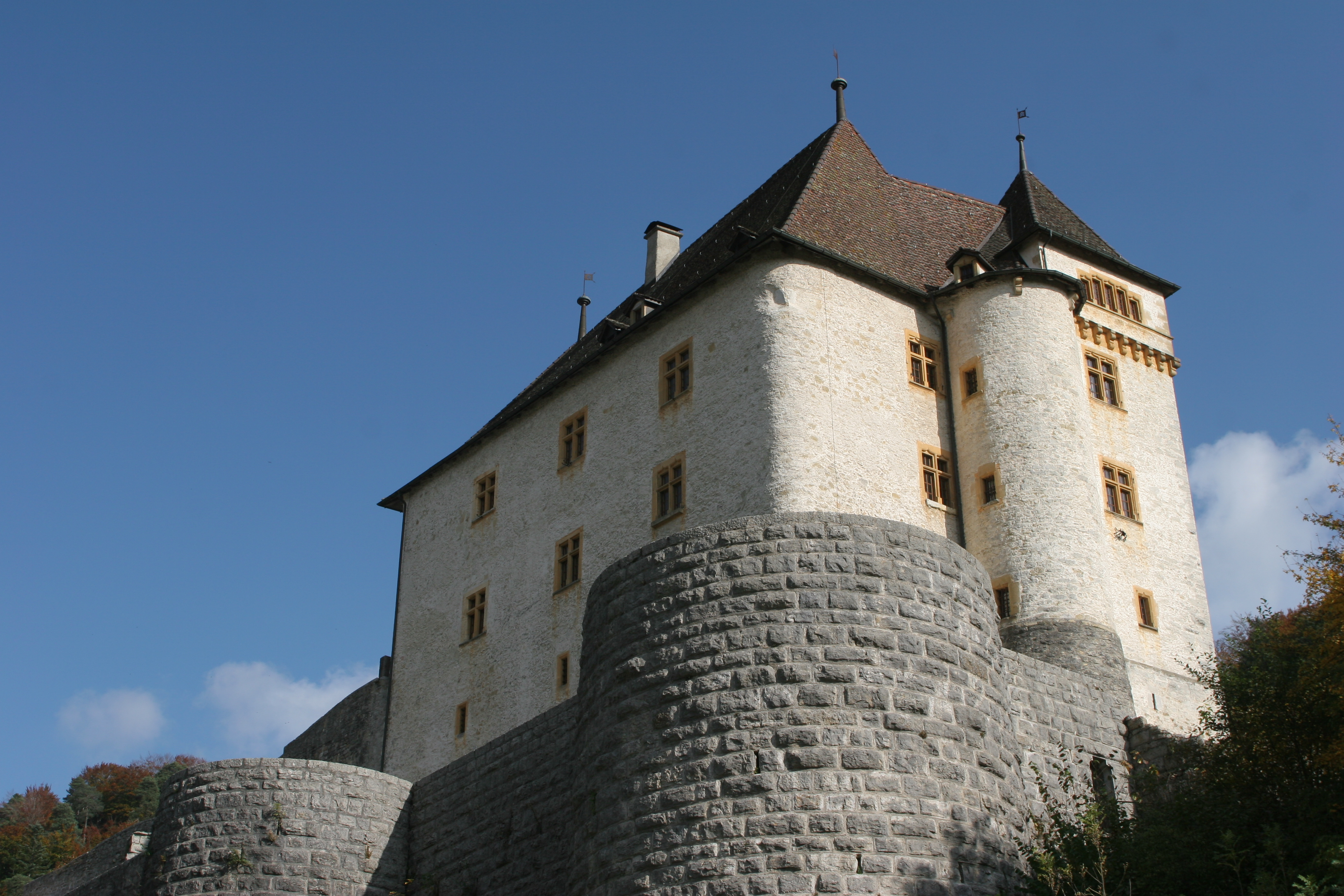
Valangin Castle

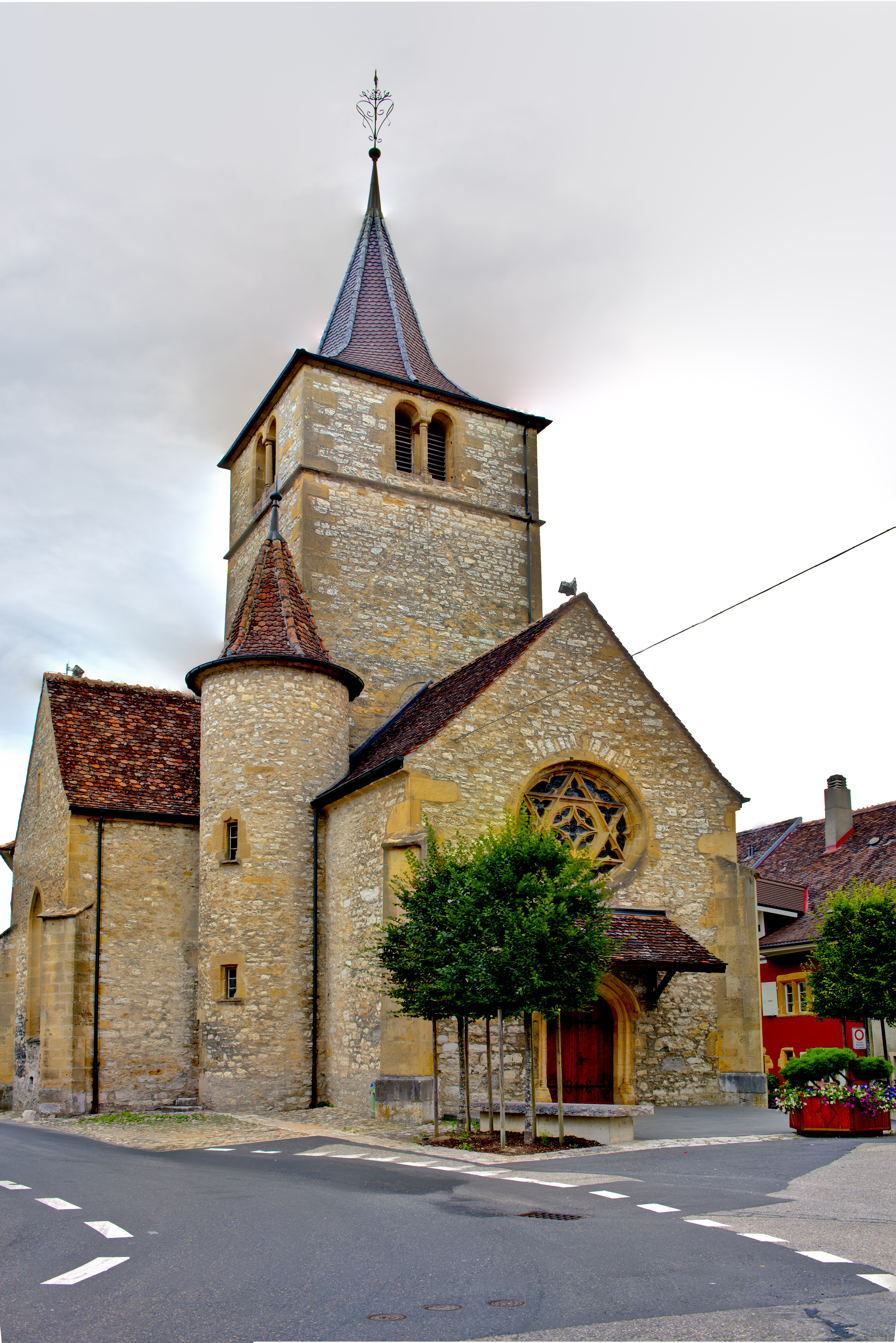
Collegiate church

== Politics ==
In the 2007 federal election the most popular party was the SP which received 25.45% of the vote. The next three most popular parties were the FDP (19.77%), the SVP (16.8%) and the LPS Party (16.02%). In the federal election, a total of 158 votes were cast, and the voter turnout was 58.3%.

== Economy ==
As of 2010, Valangin had an unemployment rate of 5.1%. As of 2008, there were 14 people employed in the primary economic sector and about 4 businesses involved in this sector. 12 people were employed in the secondary sector and there were 3 businesses in this sector. 49 people were employed in the tertiary sector, with 12 businesses in this sector. There were 204 residents of the municipality who were employed in some capacity, of which females made up 41.7% of the workforce.

In 2008 the total number of full-time equivalent jobs was 58. The number of jobs in the primary sector was 11, all of which were in agriculture. The number of jobs in the secondary sector was 11, all of which were in manufacturing. The number of jobs in the tertiary sector was 36. In the tertiary sector; 16 or 44.4% were in wholesale or retail sales or the repair of motor vehicles, 2 or 5.6% were in the movement and storage of goods, 3 or 8.3% were in a hotel or restaurant, 4 or 11.1% were in education and 5 or 13.9% were in health care.

In 2000, there were 51 workers who commuted into the municipality and 139 workers who commuted away. The municipality is a net exporter of workers, with about 2.7 workers leaving the municipality for every one entering. Of the working population, 12.7% used public transportation to get to work, and 59.8% used a private car.

== Religion ==
From the 2000 census, 108 or 27.0% were Roman Catholic, while 164 or 41.0% belonged to the Swiss Reformed Church. Of the rest of the population, there were 25 individuals (or about 6.25% of the population) who belonged to another Christian church. There was 1 individual who was Islamic. There were 1 individual who belonged to another church. 93 (or about 23.25% of the population) belonged to no church, are agnostic or atheist, and 20 individuals (or about 5.00% of the population) did not answer the question.

== Education ==
In Valangin about 158 or (39.5%) of the population have completed non-mandatory upper secondary education, and 61 or (15.3%) have completed additional higher education (either university or a Fachhochschule). Of the 61 who completed tertiary schooling, 50.8% were Swiss men, 31.1% were Swiss women, 13.1% were non-Swiss men.

In the canton of Neuchâtel most municipalities provide two years of non-mandatory kindergarten, followed by five years of mandatory primary education. The next four years of mandatory secondary education is provided at thirteen larger secondary schools, which many students travel out of their home municipality to attend. During the 2010–11 school year, there was one kindergarten class with a total of 15 students in Valangin. In the same year, there were 2 primary classes with a total of 37 students.

As of 2000, there were 26 students in Valangin who came from another municipality, while 49 residents attended schools outside the municipality.
