= Elektromesstechnik =

German audio equipment manufacturer

Elektromesstechnik (EMT) is a manufacturer of phonograph turntables and professional audio equipment, including a well-regarded line of artificial reverberation devices beginning with the EMT 140 plate reverb. The company was founded by Wilhelm Franz.

== Founding ==
Wilhelm Franz, born in Bremen in 1913, founded Elektromesstechnik Wilhelm Franz K.G. in Berlin in 1938. Two years later Wilhelm's brother, Walter, joined the company. The Allied bombing air raids over Berlin intensified in 1943 and Franz moved to Schuttertal, then, after 1945, to Lahr, in the Schwarzwald (Black Forest) region of south-western Germany. The logo of an arrowhead was chosen as a symbol of the passage of an electric signal in an electronic circuit.

== Reverb effects ==
=== 140 plate reverb ===
In 1957, EMT introduced the EMT 140 reverberation unit, an electro-mechanical reverberation device that offered an alternative to the spring reverbs and echo chambers of the era. The EMT 140 utilized a very thin 1 meter by 2 meter steel plate suspended within a steel frame. A transducer and a pickup (later two pickups for "stereo") were attached to the steel plate at different locations. When activated, the transducer induced sound waves into the plate. Those direct sound waves traveled through the plate and were, along with the indirect vibrations, sensed by the pickups and then amplified. This signal could then be mixed with the original signal to provide a simulation of a reverberant space. Reverberation times were adjustable between one and five seconds by means of a soft damping felt, which could be moved closer or farther from the steel plate. Like the R80 turntable, the "140" was developed in co-operation with the Rundfunktechnisches Institut and went on to become one of EMT's most successful products, remaining in production for 25 years. A stereo model, the EMT 140 st, was introduced in 1961.

Four EMT 140 were installed at Abbey Road Studios in the late 1950s, and three more added by 1976, for a total of 7. In 2004, the EMT 140 was inducted into the TECnology Hall of Fame, an honor given to "products and innovations that have had an enduring impact on the development of audio technology".

=== 250 digital reverb ===
EMT introduced the first commercial digital reverb, the EMT 250 mobile reverberation unit, in 1976. The "250" quickly gained a solid reputation among West Coast recording studios in the US. The physical design of the unit in 1974 by freelance industrial designer Peter Bermes for EMT in close cooperation with EMT Technical Director Karl Otto Bäder and MIT Professor Barry Blesser, who had developed and patented the unit's digital algorithms. The EMT 250 was commonly referred to either "R2D2" because of its iconografic lever-controlled interface, or "Spaceheater" due to its vertical heat sink body made of black anodised aluminium panels and separate U-shaped "chimney", housing all heat-emitting ICs and therefore being painted red. In 2007, the TEC Foundation for Excellence in Audio recognized the EMT 250 as a significant contribution to the advancement of audio technology by inducting it into the TECnology Hall of Fame.

== Phonograph turntables ==
After the war, Franz, in co-operation with the Rundfunktechnisches Institut (Broadcasting Technique Institute), directed by Walter Kuhl, designed the EMT 927 large studio turntable. Introduced in 1951, the "927" is 67 cm wide, 52 cm deep and 21.5 cm high. Its enormous main platter (44 cm) was necessary to play 16" acetate records and was driven by a very large electric motor through a sturdy idler-wheel system. Additionally, it could play the 33 1/3 rpm 12" long-playing records and 7" 45 rpm (RCA-standard) discs. The Danish firm Ortofon provided the tonearm for the 927 ("RF-297") and the first magnetic pickup officially installed by EMT on their turntables. A stroboscope engraved around the acrylic outer platter allowed the fine tuning of the 927's speed, and its quick-start arrangement allowed a remarkably short starting time of less than 500 milliseconds at 33 rpm. The 927 was built in different versions: the "927A", with an optical indicator of the position of the stylus on the grooves, the "927D", a special reference version built with special care and very close tolerances for laboratory use, the "927F" that could accommodate a second tonearm behind the platter, and "927st" stereo version.

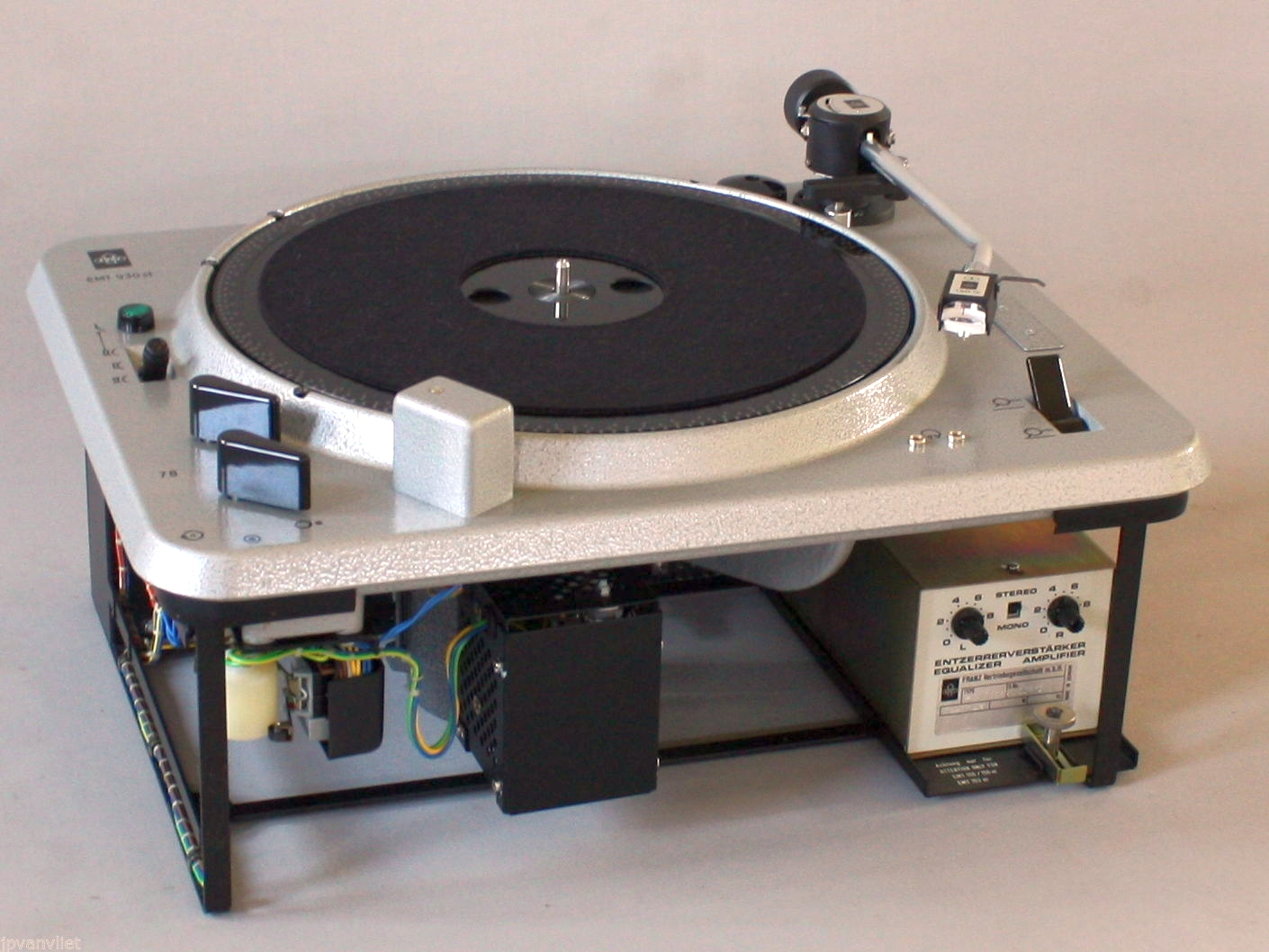
EMT 930 turntable

The EMT 930 is a large machine as well (49 cm × 39 cm × 17.5 cm), which maintains all the functional characteristics of the larger brother in a more compact package. Its very sturdy cast-metal frame, Kunststoff (Bakelite) main board and idler-wheel drive to the internal rim of its heavy platter gives it peerless sonic qualities. The drive system, start/stop system, brake and speed control are exactly as on the "927". Its bearing, though of a slightly reduced diameter than in the "927", is on par for quality, and it is a "wet" bearing too: it contains 25 ml of special EMT oil, which must be changed every time the turntable is serviced. The preamplifier of the monophonic "930" was the tube "139". The quality and reliability of the EMT machines became rapidly legendary, and the "arrowhead" logo became a symbol of German engineering at its best in professional studio audio equipment, the only possible choice for top radio stations and the phonographic industry.

With its more reasonable size, the "930" was somewhat more economical to build than the "927", making it a very interesting turntable even for smaller studios, but EMT was not building only exceptionally good (and extremely expensive) machines.

In 1958, the sound-reproduction world was shaken by the introduction of stereo, and "927"s and "930"s were quickly adapted to the new system with stereo cartridges, appropriate rewiring of the tonearm and the new stereo preamplifier "139st"; it was phased out of production when the more modern solid-state "155st" arrived, in 1960. In that same year, Studer and EMT began to cooperate officially in the professional sound sector, the German firm becoming a distributor of the Swiss equipment for many world markets. The success of this company, directed by Eugene Sporri since 1962, is driven by the Studer C37 and Revox B36/D36 tube recorders. In the same period, the German firm printed the first issue of its fabled "bulletin", named EMT-Kurier in the German edition, "EMT-Courier" in the English one. 46 issues were printed.

Wilhelm Franz, having expanded his factory (in 1963, the EMT-Gerätewerk in Lahr-Kuhbach, directed by Franz's brother Walter, employed more than 200 workers), was also following his other firms: Elektromesstechnik Wilhelm Franz KG-Lahr sold "Loopmatic", "Vid-E-dit" and Studer products in Germany and the rest of the world, EMT-Wilhelm Franz GmbH Wettingen distributed EMT products only in Switzerland, Studer-Franz AG Wettingen sold Studer products out of their home country, Thorens-Franz AG was the distributor for Thorens for the whole world. In the following years, while Studer/Revox developed their own distribution network (one part of whom originated from EMT-Wettingen), Franz slowly tightened its relations with Thorens until, in 1966, he bought a majority stake in the firm. The production of their turntable was then relocated from Wettingen to Lahr's Gerätewerk, because Germany's labor cost was far lower than Switzerland's.

It was also this close co-operation that carried, in 1969, to the birth of the first EMT tonearm, the fabulous "929" (introduced in 1971 on the new "928" and, since July of the same year, on the "930st"), loosely based on Thorens' 9" TP-14'/BTP-12S arms. The 10" long 929 replaced the Ortofon RF229/RMA229, while the "long" version of the "929", the 12" "997" for the "927", arrived in 1974 and replaced the RF297/RMA297 Ortofon.

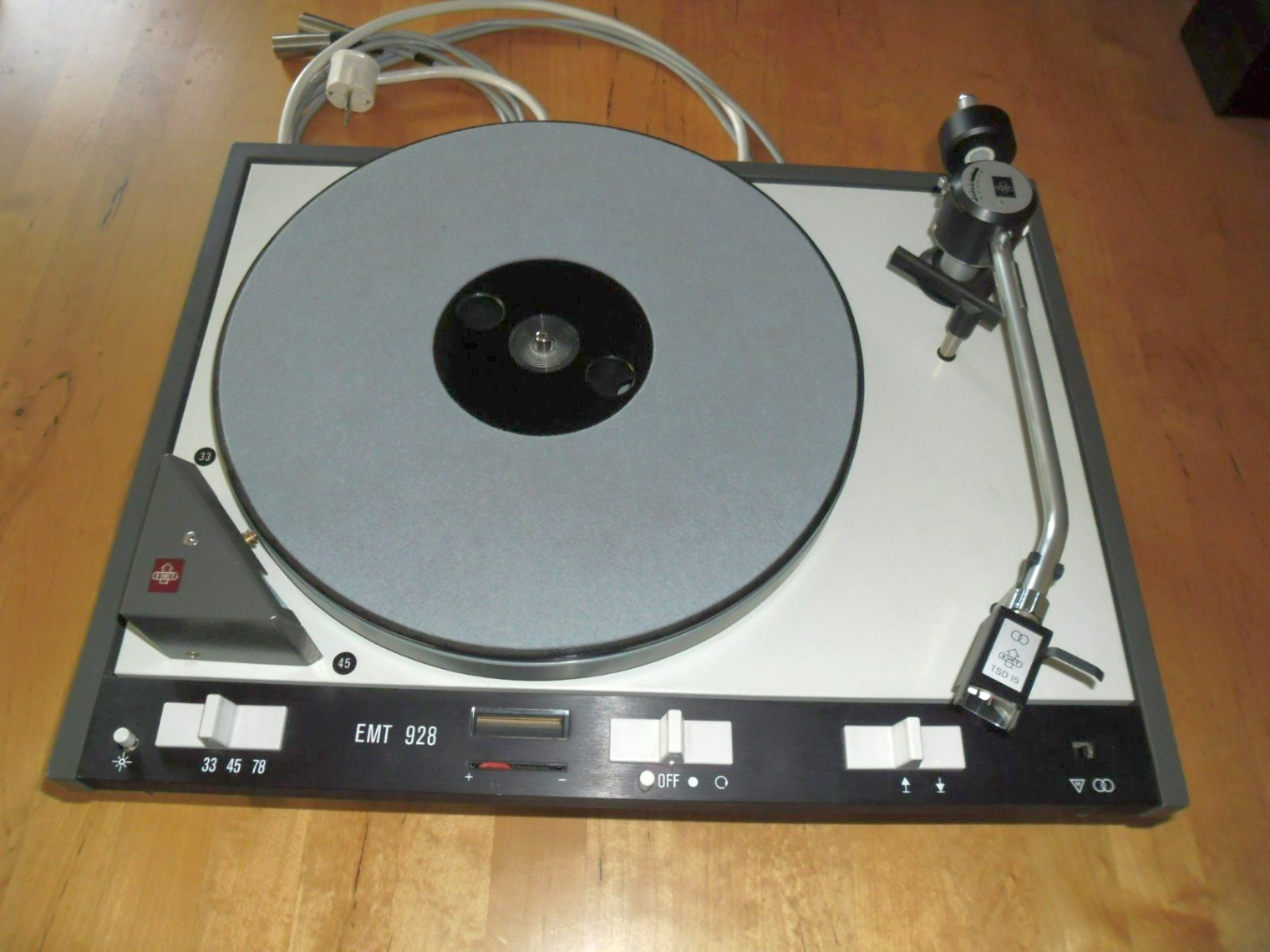
EMT 928 turntable

In 1968, to try to fight the mounting tide of Japanese turntables, it was decided to try to "diversify" the range of professional turntables, and the result of this attempt was the EMT 928. It was based on the excellent Thorens TD125, using its bearing, stroboscope, platter–subplatter arrangement and two-part sturdy chassis: both were designed and developed in the laboratories of the Gerätewerk. EMT modified the electronics, fitted their own RIAA-curve compensating circuitry and preamplifier, stiffened the suspension of the main chassis.

The "928", that used the new "929" tonearm, was the last EMT turntable to appear under the management of Wilhelm Franz.

Then the company moved its headquarters in a completely new, 35,000-square-meter factory with a tidy two-storey building in Kippenheim, Wilhelm-Franz-Strasse 1. Following this expansive trend, EMT enlarged the new premises in 1976 and 1984. In 1978, the name of the firm was changed again, this time becoming EMT-FRANZ GmbH.

Direct-drive turntables were changing the habits of radio professionals; a rigid coupling between the motor and the platter was desirable for quick starts and stops. Accordingly, as the idler-wheel concept was beginning to look old-fashioned, EMT followed the example of National's SP-10 and proceeded to build a direct-drive turntable: the EMT 950 Schallplatten-Wiedergabe-Maschine.

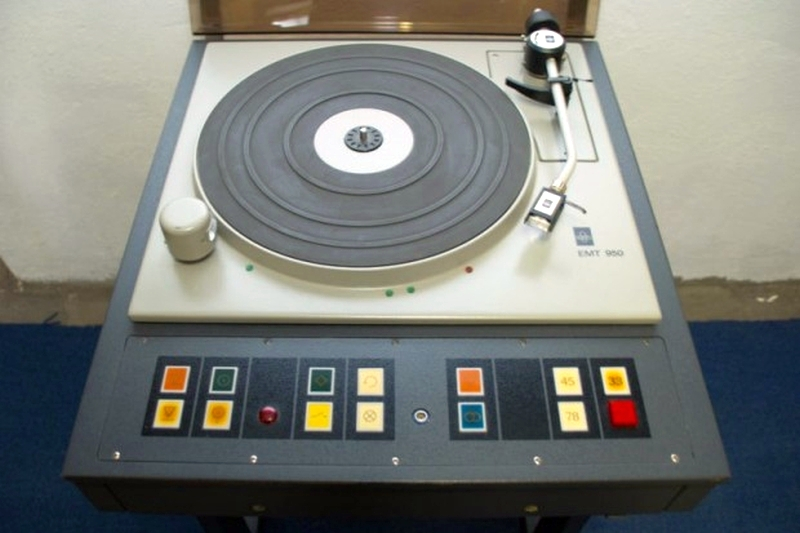
EMT 950 turntable

The EMT 950 Schallplatten-Wiedergabe-Maschine was introduced in 1976 in two types: "Standard" ("950", 693 millimeters wide), with controls on the left side of the disc, and a "Narrowline Model" ("950 E" or Schmale Ausführung, 519 mm wide, 573 mm deep, introduced at the end of 1977) conceived for less spacious studios; the "narrowline" "950" had the same controls, but its pushbuttons were all lined up in the front panel. Starting time at 33 rpm was 200 milliseconds, and, just pushing a button, the record would rotate backwards to find the beginning of a track: the user could monitor the cueing with the inbuilt speaker. Both machines could be mounted on their own "legs" or in a console; the shock absorber frame was built-in. In stock form, whichever the cabinet, the "950" had three speeds (33, 45 and 78 rpm) with automatic selection of 33 or 45 at the raising of the central adapter for the smaller records, a "929" arm in stock aluminium finish with brass or black counterweight and a TSD15 Tondose with "4 150 056" transformers on the equalizer board "7 950 038" or "7 950 088" board ("9 950 110" or "narrow" "9 950 210"). It was possible to order a tailor-made "950" to suit any professional need, provided that the customer could pay the extremely high prices of this machine. In 1976, 15000 Deutschmarks was the basic list price of a "950".

To meet the needs of less affluent stations, EMT introduced in 1979 a new model, based on the same principles as the "950": the EMT 948 broadcast turntable. It had direct drive, sophisticated electronics and a "929" tonearm, but in a much more compact envelope. Its Perspex dust cover featured a "groove" where the DJ could put the cover as a handy reminder of the record that was being played. Basically, its design owed much to the superb construction of the "950", and its sturdy metallic chassis was filled, under the deck, by a neat stack of boards carrying the electronic circuitry allowing an easy, quick access for service or repair. Though somewhat simplified if compared to the mighty "950", the "948" had the same illuminated pushbuttons, a wise choice of speeds and the reverse rotation of the record for cueing. After a first series, a green synchro light was fitted at the lower right edge of the platter to indicate the reaching of the nominal rotational speed. The external illumination "pod" was available as an option, and was mounted on the left near side of the deck.

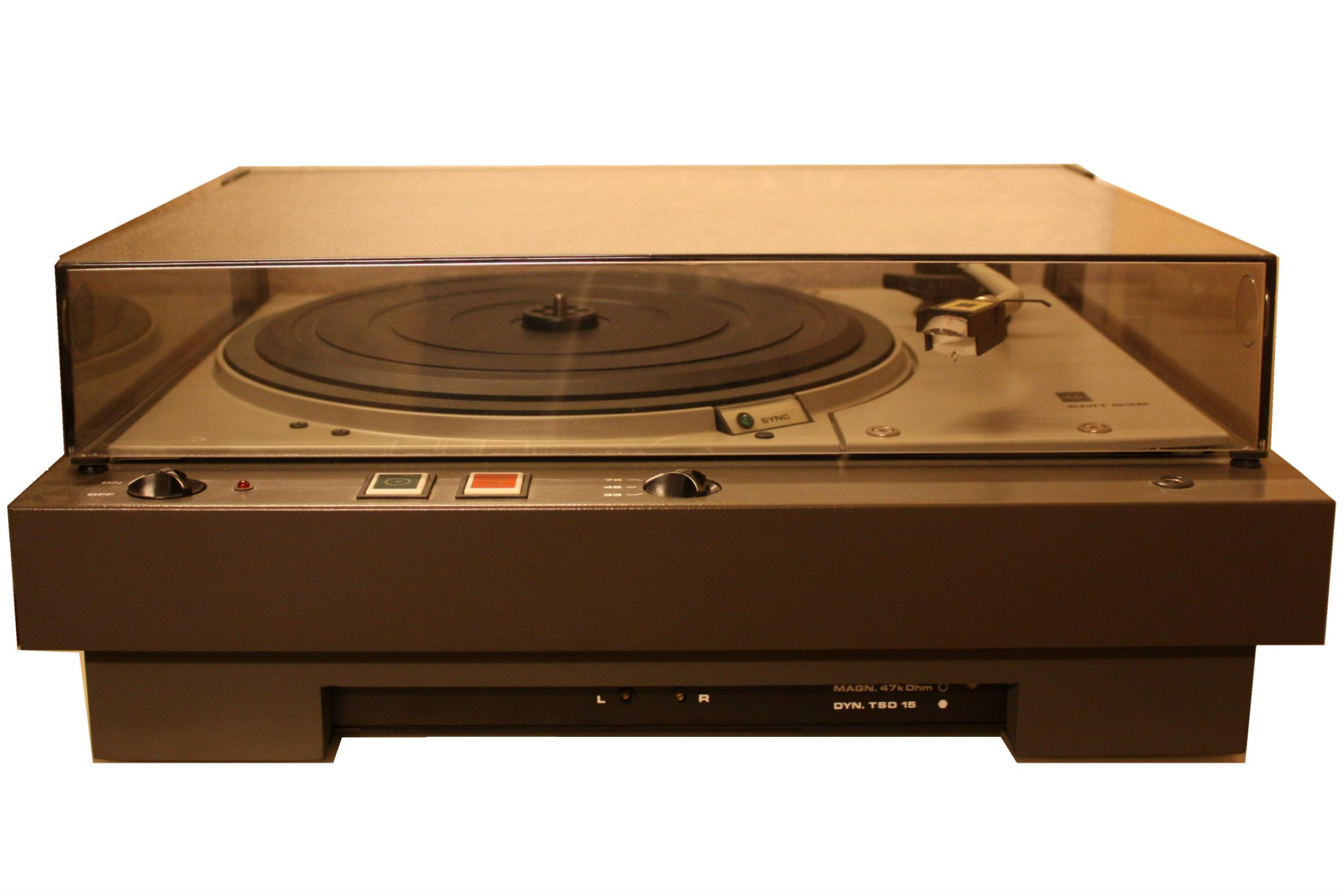
EMT 938 turntable

The EMT 948 cost around DM 12000 and was therefore still too expensive for many professional users. (For many customers in faraway countries, it was also too complicated, so EMT continued the production of the "930" until 1982.) An even smaller and cheaper unit was designed and introduced in March 1982: the EMT 938 broadcast disk reproducer (Rundfunk-Plattenspieler) featured a simplified direct-drive and electronics, it was slimmer and cheaper than its two brothers, and some of its parts, like the plinth and lid, were taken from commercial "hi-fi" products. The "938" had been designed in co-operation with Thorens, who marketed a modified version of the "938" as the TD 524, a discothèque-oriented deck that could be equipped with a Thorens TP 16L or even the EMT 929 tonearm. The "938" cost around DM 6000 without the upgradeable, pluggable moving-coil cartridge preamplifier circuit board.

In 1985, the TSD 15 cartridge was improved, fitting an elliptical "super fineline stylus" in place of the original conical one. Unfortunately, the writing was on the wall for the vinyl LPs and for the turntables built for them; the arrival of the 5" Compact Disc, in 1982, made an irreversible impact on the pro world. EMT began to produce CD players as well (the first, in 1987, was the EMT 980, followed by the EMT 981 and then the wonderful EMT 982), but in 1988 sales of CDs overcame the sale of LPs for the first time in history, and the CD/LP ratio had been declining since then with the definitive disappearance of the LP from the mass market. This left little choice: at the end of the 1980s the last EMT 950 rolled off the factory in Kippenheim.

== 1989 purchase ==
EMT was bought by the Belgian firm Barco and became "Barco-EMT" on 1 January 1989. The production of professional audio equipment was gradually discontinued.

== Awards and recognition ==
Wilhelm Franz died on 10 April 1971, at the age of 58 years. In 1983, the Audio Engineering Society awarded Franz a posthumous Honorary Membership, recognizing his impact in the professional sound field with products like the model "140", "240", and "250" reverberation units and his turntables.
