= Automaton =

Self-operating machine

Pinocchio automaton

An automaton (/ɑːˈtɑːmətɑːn/; pl.: automata or automatons) is a relatively self-operating machine or control mechanism designed to automatically follow a sequence of operations or respond to predetermined instructions. Some automata, such as bellstrikers in mechanical clocks, are designed to give the illusion to the casual observer that they are operating under their own power or will, like a mechanical robot. The term has long been commonly associated with automated puppets that resemble moving humans or animals, built to impress and/or to entertain people.

Animatronics are a modern type of automata with electronics, often used for the portrayal of characters or creatures in films and in theme park attractions.

== Etymology ==
The word automaton is the latinization of the Ancient Greek automaton (αὐτόματον), which means "acting of one's own will". It was first used by Homer to describe an automatic door opening, or automatic movement of wheeled tripods. It is more often used to describe non-electronic moving machines, especially those that have been made to resemble human or animal actions, such as the jacks on old public striking clocks, or the cuckoo and any other animated figures on a cuckoo clock.

== History ==
=== Ancient ===
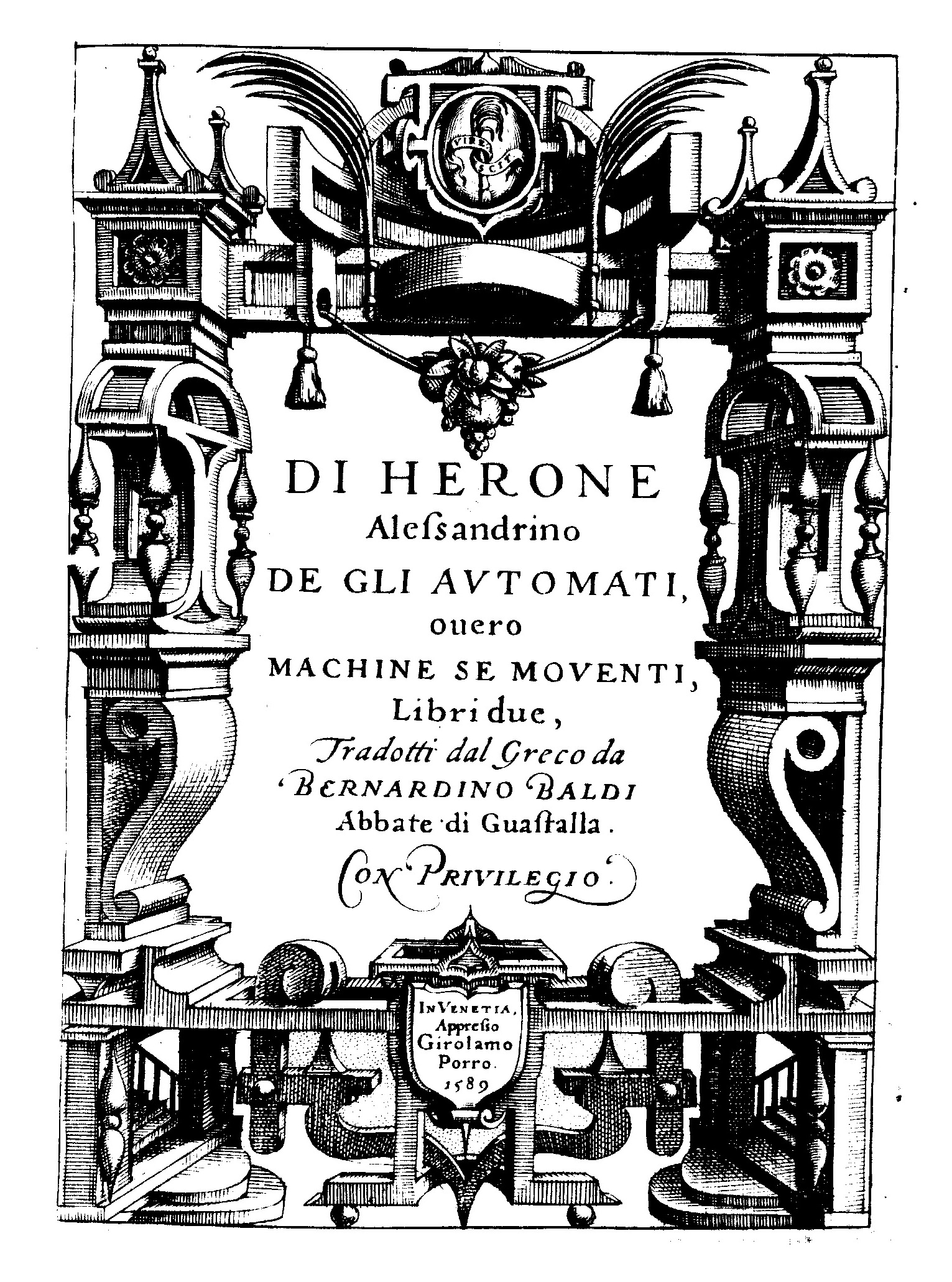
The book About automata by Hero of Alexandria (1589)

There are many examples of automata in Greek mythology: Hephaestus created automata for his workshop; Talos was an artificial man of bronze; King Alkinous of the Phaiakians employed gold and silver watchdogs. According to Aristotle, Daedalus used quicksilver to make his wooden statue of Aphrodite move. In other Greek legends he used quicksilver to install voice in his moving statues.

The automata in the Hellenistic world were intended as tools, toys, religious spectacles, or prototypes for demonstrating basic scientific principles. Numerous water-powered automata were built by Ktesibios, a Greek inventor and the first head of the Great Library of Alexandria; for example, he "used water to sound a whistle and make a model owl move. He had invented the world's first 'cuckoo clock'". (Note: This "first cuckoo clock" was further stated and described in the 2007 book The Rise and Fall of Alexandria: Birthplace of the Modern World by Justin Pollard and Howard Reid on page 132: "Soon Ctesibius's clocks were smothered in stopcocks and valves, controlling a host of devices from bells to puppets to mechanical doves that sang to mark the passing of each hour – the very first cuckoo clock!") This tradition continued in Alexandria with inventors such as the Greek mathematician Hero of Alexandria (sometimes known as Heron), whose writings on hydraulics, pneumatics, and mechanics described siphons, a fire engine, a water organ, the aeolipile, and a programmable cart. Philo of Byzantium was famous for his inventions.

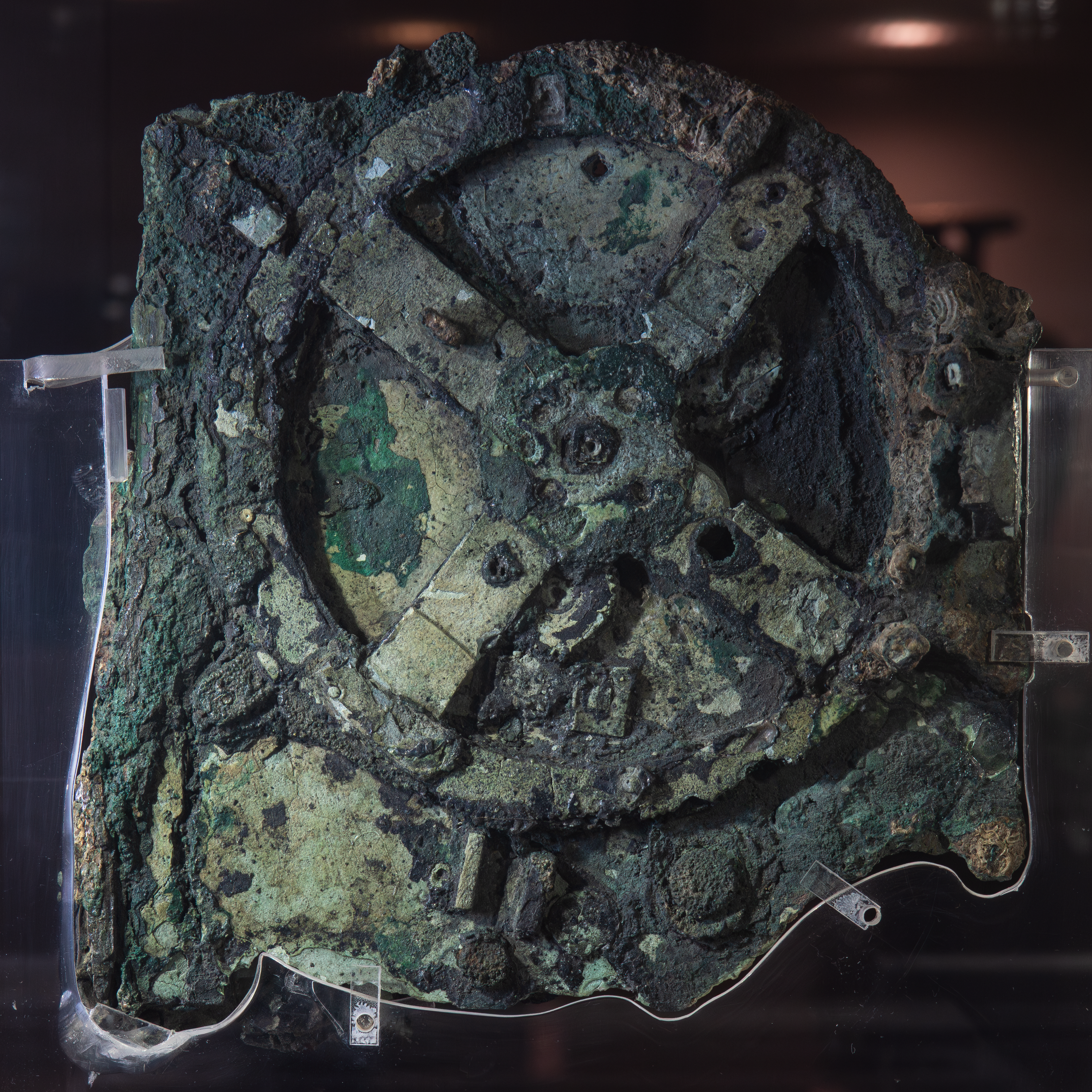
The Antikythera mechanism from c. 200–80 BC was designed to calculate the positions of astronomical objects.

Complex mechanical devices are known to have existed in Hellenistic Greece, though the only surviving example is the Antikythera mechanism, the earliest known analog computer. The clockwork is thought to have come originally from Rhodes, where there was apparently a tradition of mechanical engineering; the island was renowned for its automata; to quote Pindar's seventh Olympic Ode:

The animated figures stand
Adorning every public street
And seem to breathe in stone, or
move their marble feet.

However, the information gleaned from recent scans of the fragments indicates that it may have come from the colonies of Corinth in Sicily and implies a connection with Archimedes.

According to Jewish legend, King Solomon used his wisdom to design a throne with mechanical animals which hailed him as king when he ascended it; upon sitting down an eagle would place a crown upon his head, and a dove would bring him a Torah scroll. It is also said that when King Solomon stepped upon the throne, a mechanism was set in motion. As soon as he stepped upon the first step, a golden ox and a golden lion each stretched out one foot to support him and help him rise to the next step. On each side, the animals helped the King up until he was comfortably seated upon the throne.

In ancient China, a curious account of automata is found in the Lie Zi text, believed to have originated around 400 BCE and compiled around the fourth century CE. Within it there is a description of a much earlier encounter between King Mu of Zhou (1023–957 BCE) and a mechanical engineer known as Yan Shi, an 'artificer'. The latter proudly presented the king with a very realistic and detailed life-size, human-shaped figure of his mechanical handiwork:

The king stared at the figure in astonishment. It walked with rapid strides, moving its head up and down, so that anyone would have taken it for a live human being. The artificer touched its chin, and it began singing, perfectly in tune. He touched its hand, and it began posturing, keeping perfect time...As the performance was drawing to an end, the robot winked its eye and made advances to the ladies in attendance, whereupon the king became incensed and would have had Yen Shih [Yan Shi] executed on the spot had not the latter, in mortal fear, instantly taken the robot to pieces to let him see what it really was. And, indeed, it turned out to be only a construction of leather, wood, glue and lacquer, variously coloured white, black, red and blue. Examining it closely, the king found all the internal organs complete—liver, gall, heart, lungs, spleen, kidneys, stomach and intestines; and over these again, muscles, bones and limbs with their joints, skin, teeth and hair, all of them artificial...The king tried the effect of taking away the heart, and found that the mouth could no longer speak; he took away the liver and the eyes could no longer see; he took away the kidneys and the legs lost their power of locomotion. The king was delighted.

Other notable examples of automata include Archytas' dove, mentioned by Aulus Gellius. Similar Chinese accounts of flying automata are written of the 5th century BC Mohist philosopher Mozi and his contemporary Lu Ban, who made artificial wooden birds (ma yuan) that could successfully fly according to the Han Fei Zi and other texts.

=== Medieval ===
The manufacturing tradition of automata continued in the Greek world well into the Middle Ages. On his visit to Constantinople in 949 ambassador Liutprand of Cremona described automata in the emperor Theophilos' palace, including

"lions, made either of bronze or wood covered with gold, which struck the ground with their tails and roared with open mouth and quivering tongue," "a tree of gilded bronze, its branches filled with birds, likewise made of bronze gilded over, and these emitted cries appropriate to their species" and "the emperor's throne" itself, which "was made in such a cunning manner that at one moment it was down on the ground, while at another it rose higher and was to be seen up in the air."

Similar automata in the throne room (singing birds, roaring and moving lions) were described by Luitprand's contemporary the Byzantine emperor Constantine Porphyrogenitus, in his book De Ceremoniis (Perì tês Basileíou Tákseōs).

In the mid-8th century, the first wind powered automata were built: "statues that turned with the wind over the domes of the four gates and the palace complex of the Round City of Baghdad". The "public spectacle of wind-powered statues had its private counterpart in the 'Abbasid palaces where automata of various types were predominantly displayed." Also in the 8th century, the Muslim alchemist, Jābir ibn Hayyān (Geber), included recipes for constructing artificial snakes, scorpions, and humans that would be subject to their creator's control in his coded Book of Stones. In 827, Abbasid caliph al-Ma'mun had a silver and golden tree in his palace in Baghdad, which had the features of an automatic machine. There were metal birds that sang automatically on the swinging branches of this tree built by Muslim inventors and engineers. The Abbasid caliph al-Muqtadir also had a silver and golden tree in his palace in Baghdad in 917, with birds on it flapping their wings and singing. In the 9th century, the Banū Mūsā brothers invented a programmable automatic flute player and which they described in their Book of Ingenious Devices.

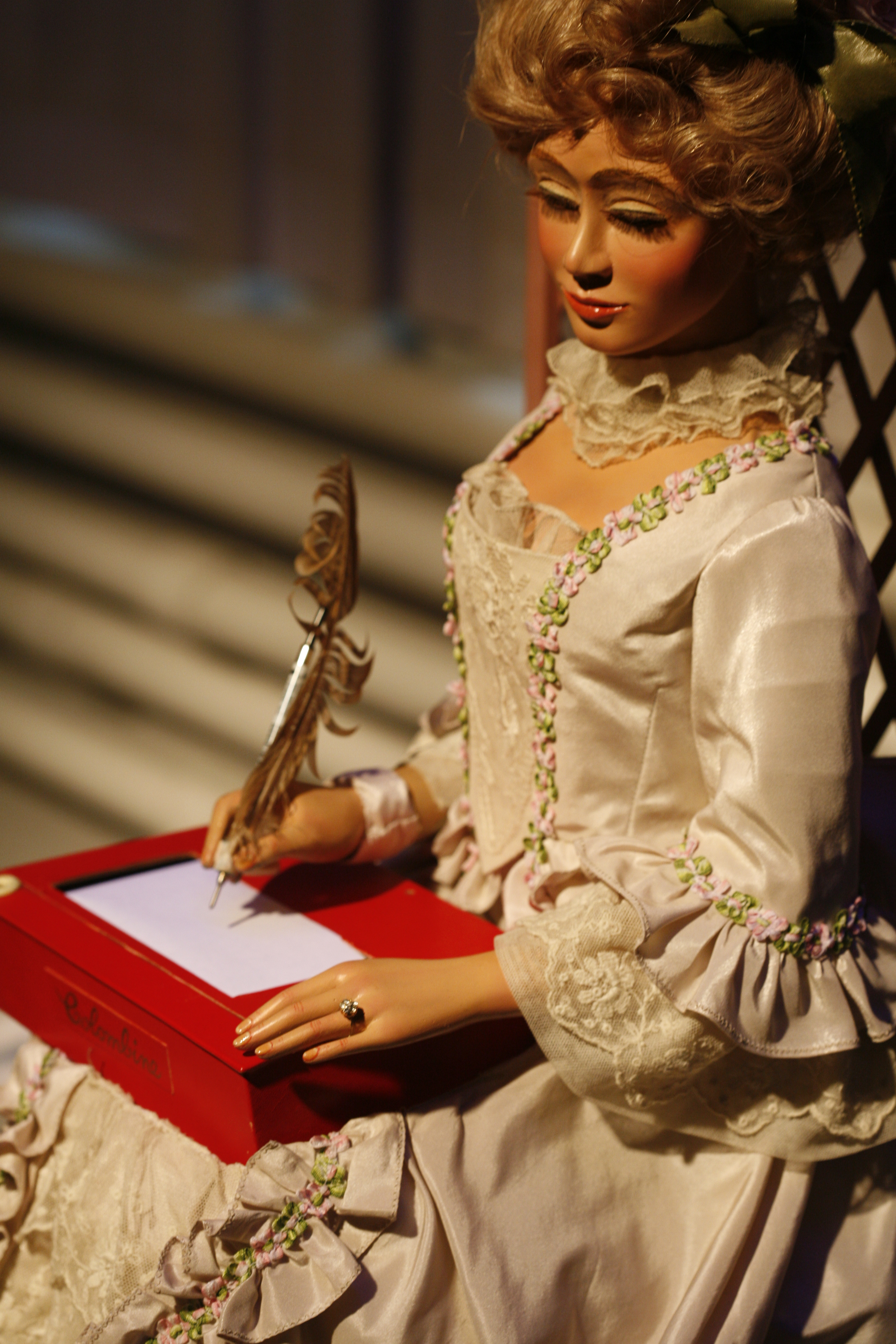
Automaton in the Swiss Museum CIMA

An automaton writing a letter in Swiss Museum CIMA

Al-Jazari described complex programmable humanoid automata amongst other machines he designed and constructed in the Book of Knowledge of Ingenious Mechanical Devices in 1206. His automaton was a boat with four automatic musicians that floated on a lake to entertain guests at royal drinking parties. His mechanism had a programmable drum machine with pegs (cams) that bump into little levers that operate the percussion. The drummer could be made to play different rhythms and drum patterns if the pegs were moved around.

Al-Jazari constructed a hand washing automaton first employing the flush mechanism now used in modern toilets. It features a female automaton standing by a basin filled with water. When the user pulls the lever, the water drains and the automaton refills the basin. His "peacock fountain" was another more sophisticated hand washing device featuring humanoid automata as servants who offer soap and towels. Mark E. Rosheim describes it as follows: "Pulling a plug on the peacock's tail releases water out of the beak; as the dirty water from the basin fills the hollow base a float rises and actuates a linkage which makes a servant figure appear from behind a door under the peacock and offer soap. When more water is used, a second float at a higher level trips and causes the appearance of a second servant figure—with a towel!"

Al-Jazari thus appears to have been the first inventor to display an interest in creating human-like machines for practical purposes such as manipulating the environment for human comfort. Lamia Balafrej has also pointed out the prevalence of the figure of the automated slave in al-Jazari's treatise. Automated slaves were a frequent motif in ancient and medieval literature but it was not so common to find them described in a technical book. Balafrej has also written about automated female slaves, which appeared in timekeepers and as liquid-serving devices in medieval Arabic sources, thus suggesting a link between feminized forms of labor like housekeeping, medieval slavery, and the imaginary of automation.

In 1066, the Chinese inventor Su Song built a water clock in the form of a tower which featured mechanical figurines which chimed the hours.

Samarangana Sutradhara, a Sanskrit treatise by Bhoja (11th century), includes a chapter about the construction of mechanical contrivances (automata), including mechanical bees and birds, fountains shaped like humans and animals, and male and female dolls that refilled oil lamps, danced, played instruments, and re-enacted scenes from Hindu mythology.

Villard de Honnecourt, in his 1230s sketchbook, depicted an early escapement mechanism in a drawing titled How to make an angel keep pointing his finger toward the Sun with an angel that would perpetually turn to face the sun. He also drew an automaton of a bird with jointed wings, which led to their design implementation in clocks.

At the end of the thirteenth century, Robert II, Count of Artois, built a pleasure garden at his castle at Hesdin that incorporated several automata as entertainment in the walled park. The work was conducted by local workmen and overseen by the Italian knight Renaud Coignet. It included monkey marionettes, a sundial supported by lions and "wild men", mechanized birds, mechanized fountains and a bellows-operated organ. The park was famed for its automata well into the fifteenth century before it was destroyed by English soldiers in the sixteenth century.

The Chinese author Xiao Xun wrote that when the Ming dynasty founder Hongwu (r. 1368–1398) was destroying the palaces of Khanbaliq belonging to the previous Yuan dynasty, there were—among many other mechanical devices—automata found that were in the shape of tigers.

=== Renaissance and early modern ===
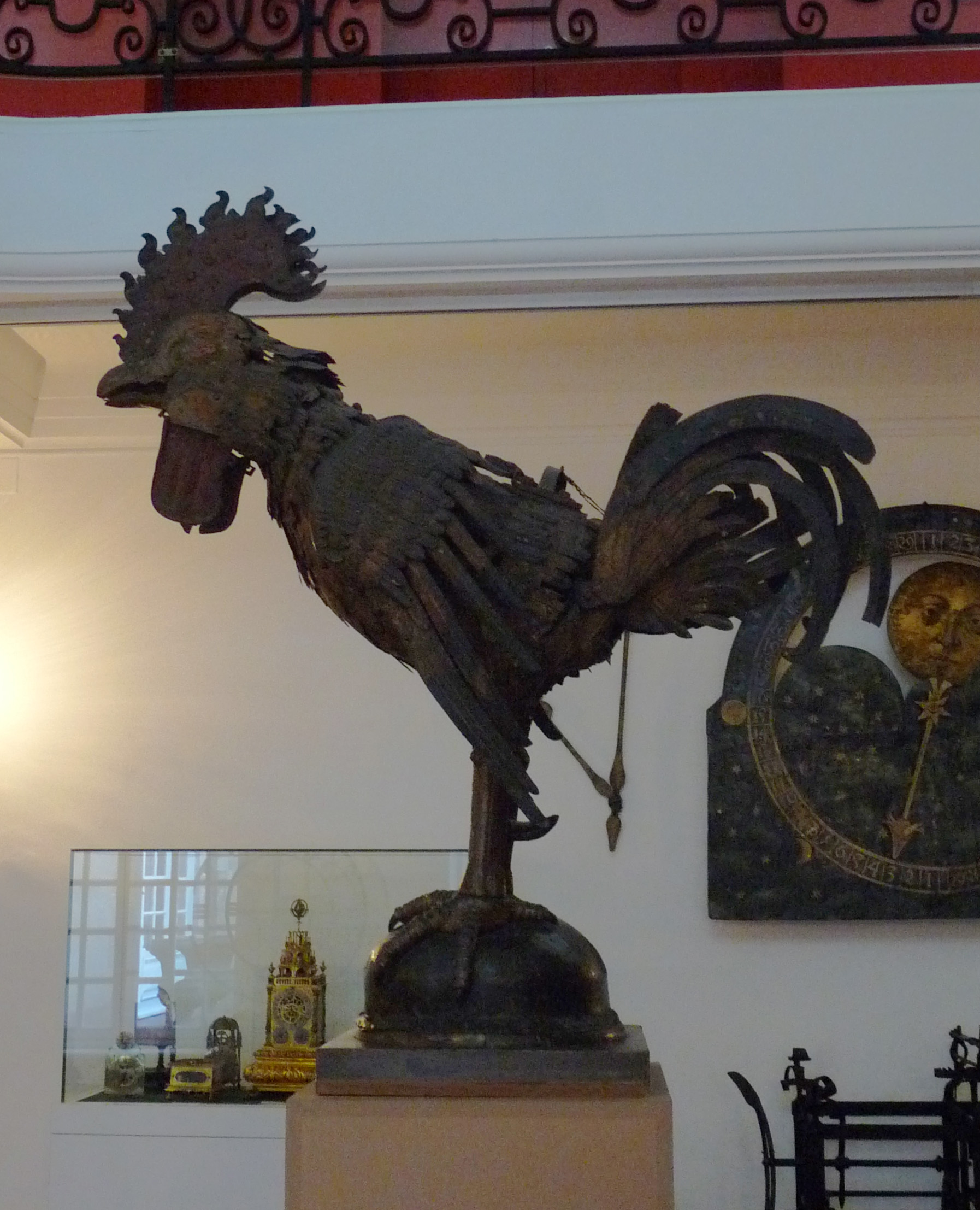
First Strasbourg clock rooster, worked from 1352 to 1789

A cuckoo clock with a built-in automaton of a cuckoo that flaps its wings and opens its beak in time to the sounds of the cuckoo call to mark the number of hours on the analogue dial

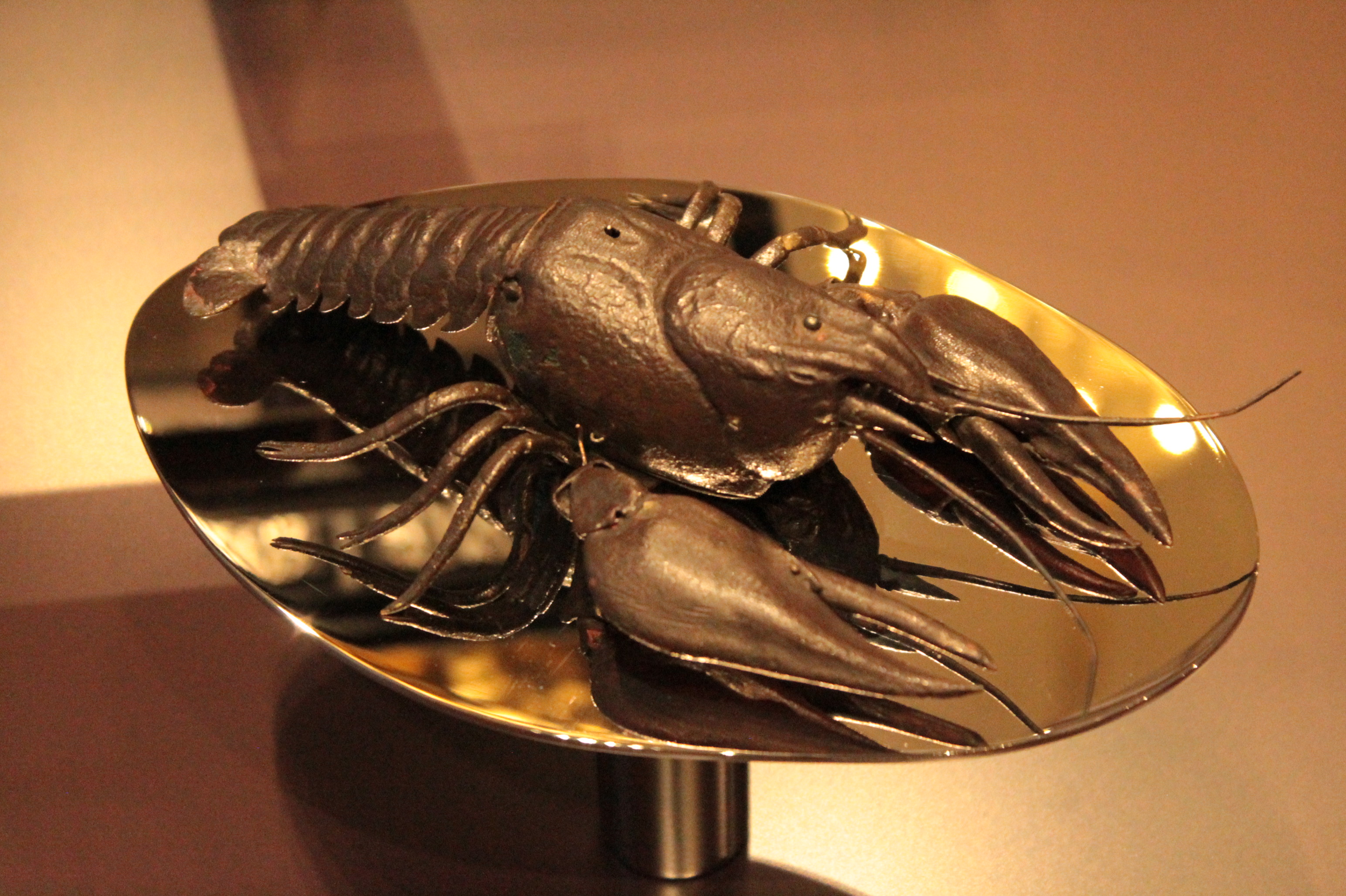
Clockwork crayfish automaton, made in Augsburg in 1589, Technical Instrument Museum, Dresden

The Renaissance witnessed a considerable revival of interest in automata. Hero's treatises were edited and translated into Latin and Italian. Hydraulic and pneumatic automata, similar to those described by Hero, were created for garden grottoes.

Giovanni Fontana, a Paduan engineer in 1420, developed Bellicorum instrumentorum liber (Note: Full title: Bellicorum instrumentorum liber, cum figuris et fictitys litoris conscriptus, Latin for "Illustrated and encrypted book of war instruments") which includes a puppet of a camelid driven by a clothed primate twice the height of a human being and an automaton of Mary Magdalene. He also created mechanical devils and rocket-propelled animal automata.

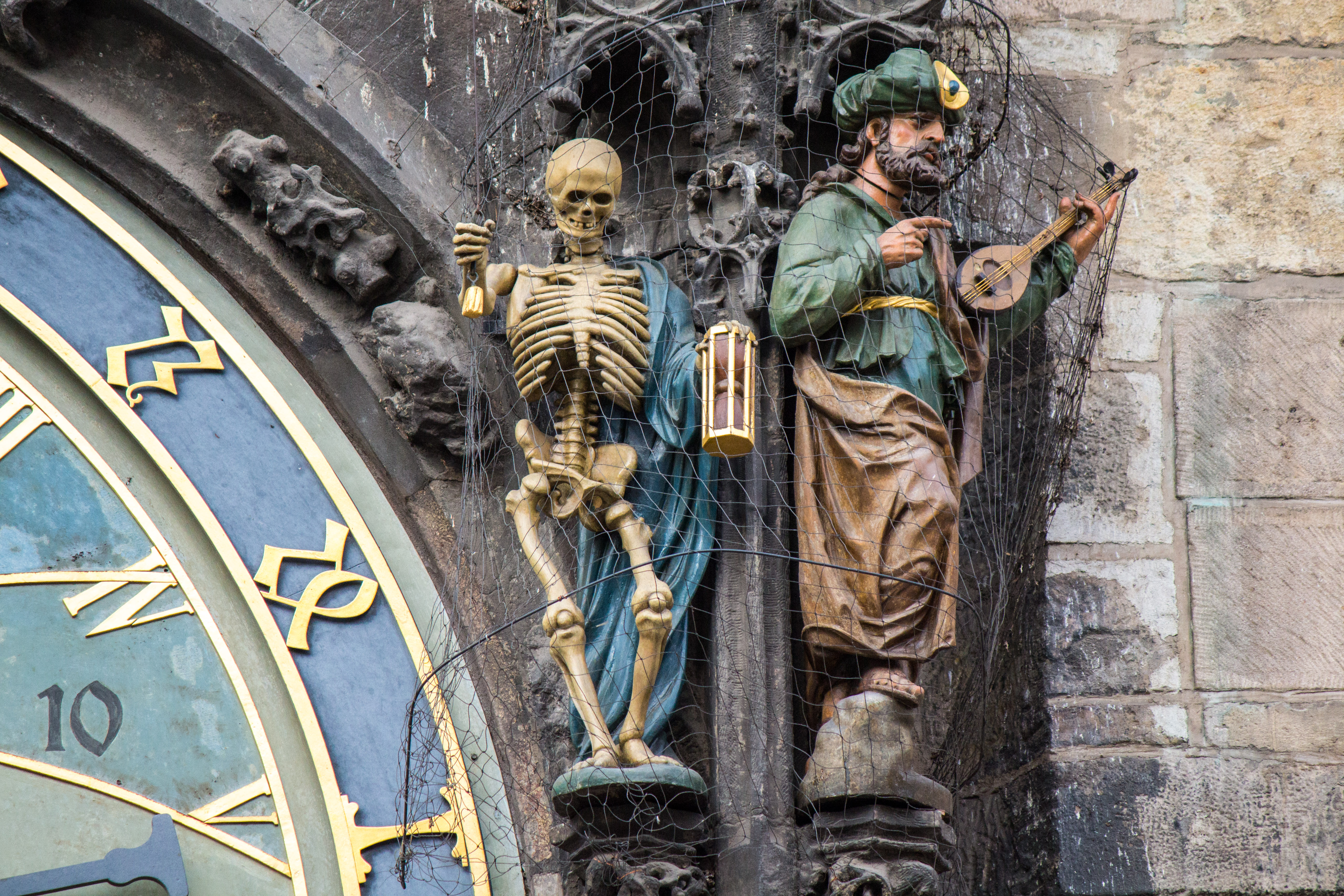
Bell-ringing Death on Prague astronomical clock

While functional, early clocks were also often designed as novelties and spectacles which integrated features of automata. Many big and complex clocks with automated figures were built as public spectacles in European town centres. One of the earliest of these large clocks was the Strasbourg astronomical clock, built in the 14th century which takes up the entire side of a cathedral wall. It contained an astronomical calendar, automata depicting animals, saints and the life of Christ. The mechanical rooster of Strasbourg clock was active from 1352 to 1789. The clock still functions to this day, but has undergone several restorations since its initial construction. The Prague astronomical clock was built in 1410, animated figures were added from the 17th century onwards. Numerous clockwork automata were manufactured in the 16th century, principally by the goldsmiths of the Free Imperial Cities of central Europe. These wondrous devices found a home in the cabinet of curiosities or Wunderkammern of the princely courts of Europe.

In 1454, Duke Philip created an entertainment show named The extravagant Feast of the Pheasant, which was intended to influence the Duke's peers to participate in a crusade against the Ottomans but ended up being a grand display of automata, giants, and dwarves.

A banquet in Camilla of Aragon's honor in Italy, 1475, featured a lifelike automated camel. The spectacle was a part of a larger parade which continued over days.

Leonardo da Vinci sketched a complex mechanical knight, which he may have built and exhibited at a celebration hosted by Ludovico Sforza at the court of Milan around 1495. The design of Leonardo's robot was not rediscovered until the 1950s. A functional replica was later built that could move its arms, twist its head, and sit up.

Da Vinci is frequently credited with constructing a mechanical lion, which he presented to King Francois I in Lyon in 1515. Although no record of the device's original designs remain, a recreation of this piece is housed at the Château du Clos Lucé.

The Smithsonian Institution has in its collection a clockwork monk, about 15 in (380 mm) high, possibly dating as early as 1560. The monk is driven by a key-wound spring and walks the path of a square, striking his chest with his right arm, while raising and lowering a small wooden cross and rosary in his left hand, turning and nodding his head, rolling his eyes, and mouthing silent obsequies. From time to time, he brings the cross to his lips and kisses it. It is believed that the monk was manufactured by Juanelo Turriano, mechanician to the Holy Roman Emperor Charles V.

The first description of a modern cuckoo clock was by the Augsburg nobleman Philipp Hainhofer in 1629. The clock belonged to Prince Elector August von Sachsen. By 1650, the workings of mechanical cuckoos were understood and were widely disseminated in Athanasius Kircher's handbook on music, Musurgia Universalis. In what is the first documented description of how a mechanical cuckoo works, a mechanical organ with several automated figures is described. In 18th-century Germany, clockmakers began making cuckoo clocks for sale. Clock shops selling cuckoo clocks became commonplace in the Black Forest region by the middle of the 18th century.

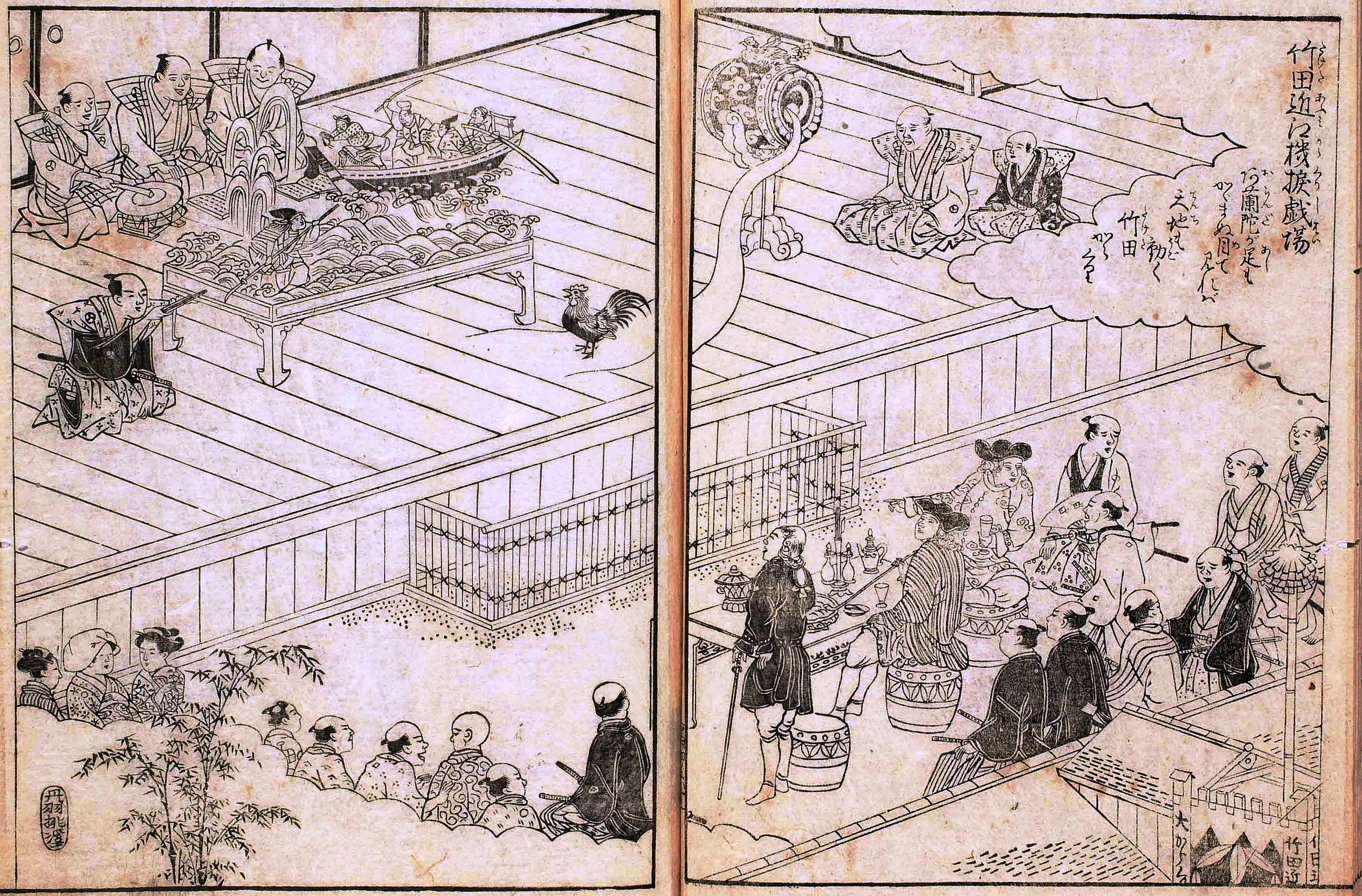
A Japanese automata theater in Osaka, drawn in 18th century. The Takeda family opened their automata theater in 1662.

Japan adopted clockwork automata in the early 17th century as "karakuri" puppets. In 1662, Takeda Omi completed his first butai karakuri and then built several of these large puppets for theatrical exhibitions. Karakuri puppets went through a golden age during the Edo period (1603–1867).

A new attitude towards automata is to be found in René Descartes when he suggested that the bodies of animals are nothing more than complex machines – the bones, muscles and organs could be replaced with cogs, pistons, and cams. Thus mechanism became the standard to which Nature and the organism was compared. France in the 17th century was the birthplace of those ingenious mechanical toys that were to become prototypes for the engines of the Industrial Revolution. Thus, in 1649, when Louis XIV was still a child, François-Joseph de Camus designed for him a miniature coach, complete with horses and footmen, a page, and a lady within the coach; all these figures exhibited a perfect movement. According to Labat, General de Gennes constructed, in 1688, in addition to machines for gunnery and navigation, a peacock that walked and ate. Athanasius Kircher produced many automata to create Jesuit shows, including a statue which spoke and listened via a speaking tube.

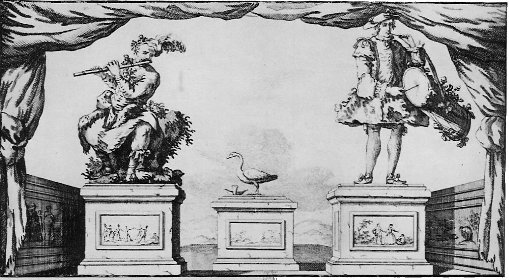
All three of Vaucanson's Automata: The Flute Player, The Tambourine Player, and Digesting Duck

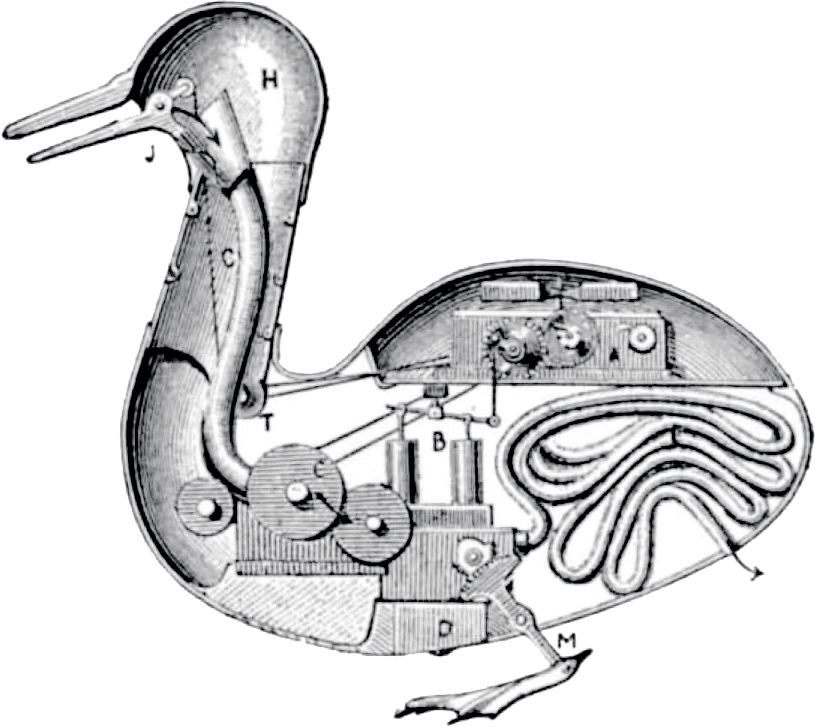
A postulated interior of the Duck of Vaucanson (1738–1739)

The world's first successfully-built biomechanical automaton is considered to be The Flute Player, which could play twelve songs, created by the French engineer Jacques de Vaucanson in 1737. He also constructed The Tambourine Player and the Digesting Duck, a mechanical duck that – apart from quacking and flapping its wings – gave the false illusion of eating and defecating, seeming to endorse Cartesian ideas that animals are no more than machines of flesh.

In 1769, a chess-playing machine called the Turk, created by Wolfgang von Kempelen, made the rounds of the courts of Europe purporting to be an automaton. The Turk beat Benjamin Franklin in a game of chess when Franklin was ambassador to France. The Turk was actually operated from inside by a hidden human director, and was not a true automaton.

Maillardet's automaton is drawing a picture.

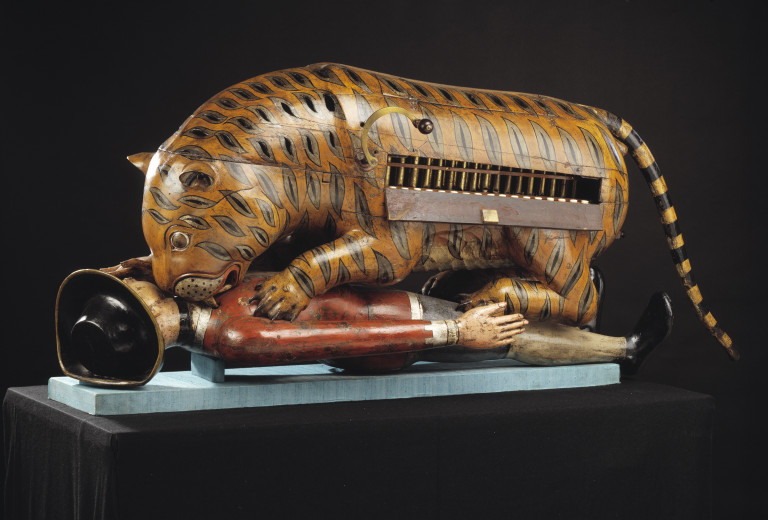
Tipu's Tiger made for Tipu Sultan of Mysore, featuring a European soldier being mauled by a tiger

Other 18th century automaton makers include the prolific Swiss Pierre Jaquet-Droz (see Jaquet-Droz automata) and his son Henri-Louis Jaquet-Droz, and his contemporary Henri Maillardet. Maillardet, a Swiss mechanic, created an automaton capable of drawing four pictures and writing three poems. Maillardet's Automaton is now part of the collections at the Franklin Institute Science Museum in Philadelphia. Belgian-born John Joseph Merlin created the mechanism of the Silver Swan automaton, now at Bowes Museum. A musical elephant made by the French clockmaker Hubert Martinet in 1774 is one of the highlights of Waddesdon Manor. Tipu's Tiger is another late-18th century example of automata, made for Tipu Sultan, featuring a European soldier being mauled by a tiger. Catherine the Great of Russia was gifted a very large and elaborate Peacock Clock created by James Cox in 1781 now on display in the Hermitage Museum in Saint Petersburg.

According to philosopher Michel Foucault, Frederick the Great, king of Prussia from 1740 to 1786, was "obsessed" with automata. According to Manuel de Landa, "he put together his armies as a well-oiled clockwork mechanism whose components were robot-like warriors".

In 1801, Joseph Jacquard built his loom automaton that was controlled autonomously with punched cards.

Automata, particularly watches and clocks, were popular in China during the 18th and 19th centuries, and items were produced for the Chinese market. Strong interest by Chinese collectors in the 21st century brought many interesting items to market where they have had dramatic realizations.

=== Modern ===
The famous magician Jean-Eugène Robert-Houdin (1805–1871) was known for creating automata for his stage shows. Automata that acted according to a set of preset instructions were popular with magicians during this time.

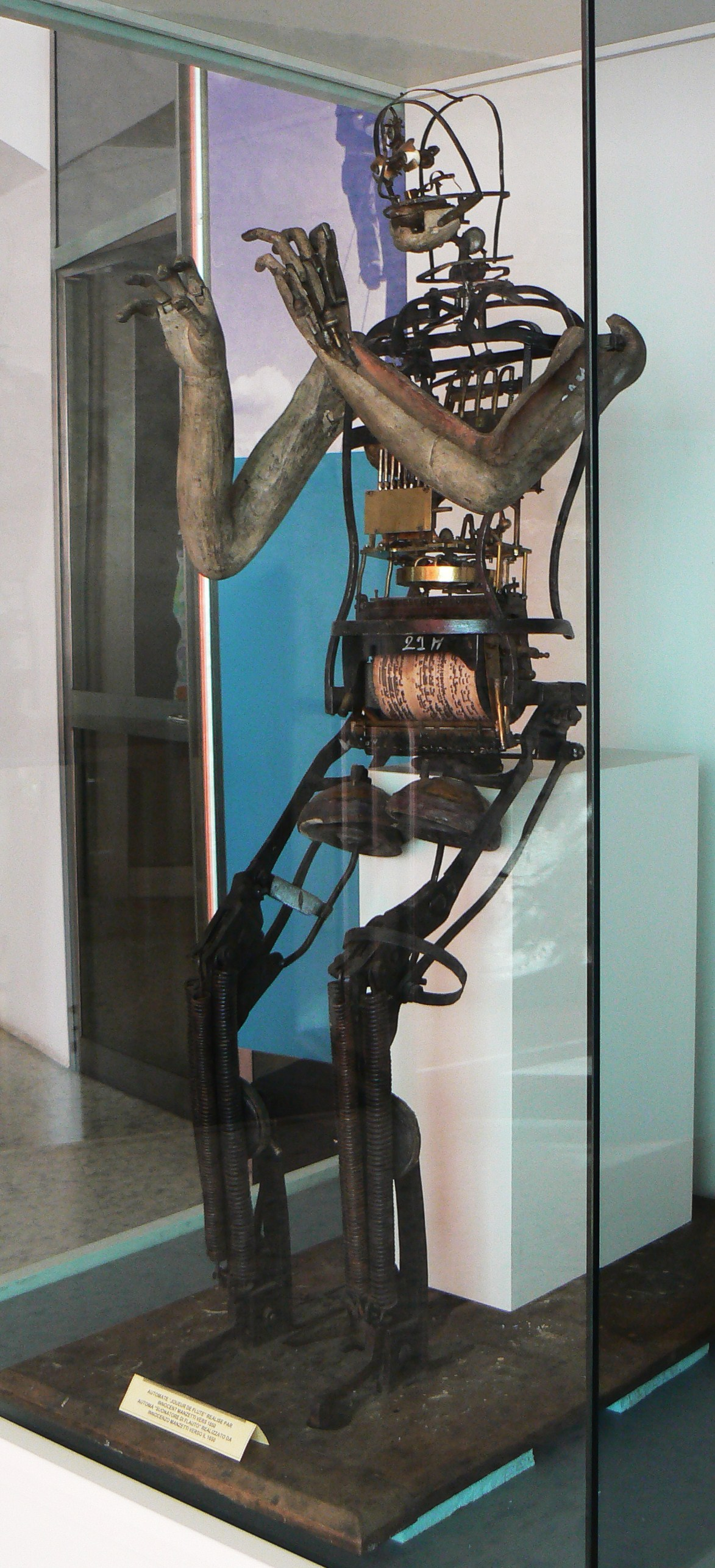
The flute-player by Innocenzo Manzetti (1840)

In 1840, Italian inventor Innocenzo Manzetti constructed a flute-playing automaton, in the shape of a man, life-size, seated on a chair. Hidden inside the chair were levers, connecting rods and compressed air tubes, which made the automaton's lips and fingers move on the flute according to a program recorded on a cylinder similar to those used in player pianos. The automaton was powered by clockwork and could perform 12 different arias. As part of the performance, it would rise from the chair, bow its head, and roll its eyes.

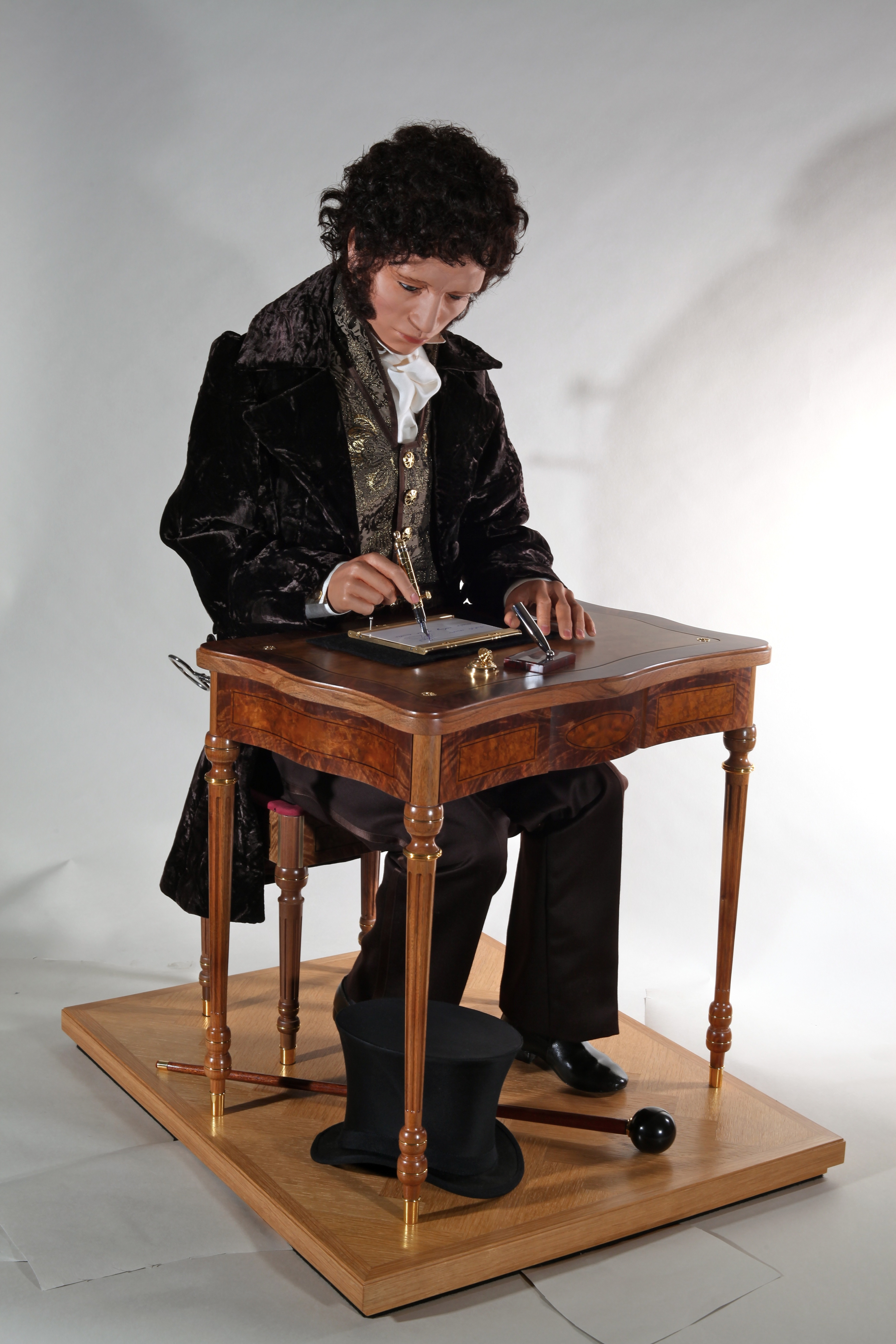
Alexander Pushkin automaton (2010) by Swiss automaton maker François Junod

The period between 1860 and 1910 is known as "The Golden Age of Automata". Mechanical coin-operated fortune tellers were introduced to boardwalks in Britain and America. In Paris during this period, many small family based companies of automata makers thrived. From their workshops they exported thousands of clockwork automata and mechanical singing birds around the world. Although now rare and expensive, these French automata attract collectors worldwide. The main French makers were Bontems, Lambert, Phalibois, Renou, Roullet & Decamps, Theroude and Vichy.

Abstract automata theory started in mid-20th century with finite automata; it is applied in branches of formal and natural science including computer science, physics, biology, as well as linguistics.

Contemporary automata continue this tradition with an emphasis on art, rather than technological sophistication. Contemporary automata are represented by the works of Cabaret Mechanical Theatre in the United Kingdom, Thomas Kuntz, Arthur Ganson, Joe Jones and Le Défenseur du Temps by French artist Jacques Monestier.

Since 1990 Dutch artist Theo Jansen has been building large automated PVC structures called strandbeest (beach animal) that can walk on wind power or compressed air. Jansen claims that he intends them to automatically evolve and develop artificial intelligence, with herds roaming freely over the beach.

British sculptor Sam Smith (1908–1983) was a well-known maker of automata.

=== Proposals ===
In 2016, the NASA Innovative Advanced Concepts program studied a rover, the Automaton Rover for Extreme Environments, designed to survive for an extended time in Venus' environmental conditions. Unlike other modern automata, AREE is an automaton instead of a robot for practical reasons—Venus's harsh conditions, particularly its surface temperature of 462 °C (864 °F), make operating electronics there for any significant time impossible. It would be controlled by a mechanical computer and driven by wind power.

== Clocks ==
Automaton clocks are clocks which feature automatons within or around the housing and typically activate around the beginning of each hour, at each half hour, or at each quarter hour. They were largely produced from the 1st century BC to the end of the Victorian times in Europe. Older clocks typically featured religious characters or other mythical characters such as Death or Father Time. As time progressed, however, automaton clocks began to feature influential characters at the time of creation, such as kings, famous composers, or industrialists. Examples of automaton clocks include chariot clocks and cuckoo clocks. While automaton clocks are largely perceived to have been in use during medieval times in Europe, they are largely produced in Japan today.

In Automata theory, clocks are regarded as timed automatons, a type of finite automaton. Automaton clocks being finite essentially means that automaton clocks have a certain number of states in which they can exist. The exact number is the number of combinations possible on a clock with the hour, minute, and second hand: 43,200. The title of timed automaton declares that the automaton changes states at a set rate, which for clocks is 1 state change every second. Clock automata only takes as input the time displayed by the previous state. The automata uses this input to produce the next state, a display of time 1 second later than the previous. Clock automata often also use the previous state's input to 'decide' whether or not the next state requires merely changing the hands on the clock, or if a special function is required, such as a mechanical bird popping out of a house like in cuckoo clocks. This choice is evaluated through the position of complex gears, cams, axles, and other mechanical devices within the automaton.

== See also ==
- Automata theory, the study of abstract machines and automata
- Mechanical toy
- Wind-up toy
- Android
- Brazen head
- Cellular automaton
- Centre International de la Mécanique d'Art
- Christian Ristow
- Ctesibius
- Genesis Redux
- Fortune teller machine
- Giles Walker
- Golem
- Hero of Alexandria
- La Maison de la Magie Robert-Houdin display of 19th century automata
- Maillardet's automaton
- Marvin's Marvelous Mechanical Museum
- Orchestrion
- Singing bird box
- Theo Jansen
- Whirligig
