= Reverb effect =

Artificial reverberation effect

Short sample of reverberation effect
Clean signal, followed by 3 different versions of reverberation (with longer and longer decay times).

A reverb effect, or reverb, is an audio effect applied to simulate reverberation. It may be created through physical means, such as echo chambers, or electronically through audio signal processing. The American producer Bill Putnam is credited for the first artistic use of artificial reverb in music, on the 1947 song "Peg o' My Heart" by the Harmonicats.

Spring reverb, created with a series of mounted springs, is popular in surf music and dub reggae. Plate reverb uses electromechanical transducers to create vibrations in large plates of sheet metal. Convolution reverb uses impulse responses to record the reverberation of physical spaces and recreate them digitally. Gated reverb became a staple of 1980s pop music, used by drummers including Phil Collins. Shimmer reverb, which alters the pitch of the reverberated sound, is often used in ambient music.

== Varieties ==
=== Echo chambers ===
The first reverb effects, introduced in the 1930s, were created by playing recordings through loudspeakers in reverberating spaces and recording the sound. The American producer Bill Putnam is credited for the first artistic use of artificial reverb in music, on the 1947 song "Peg o' My Heart" by the Harmonicats. Putnam placed a microphone and loudspeaker in the studio bathroom to create an echo chamber, adding an "eerie dimension".

=== Spring reverb ===
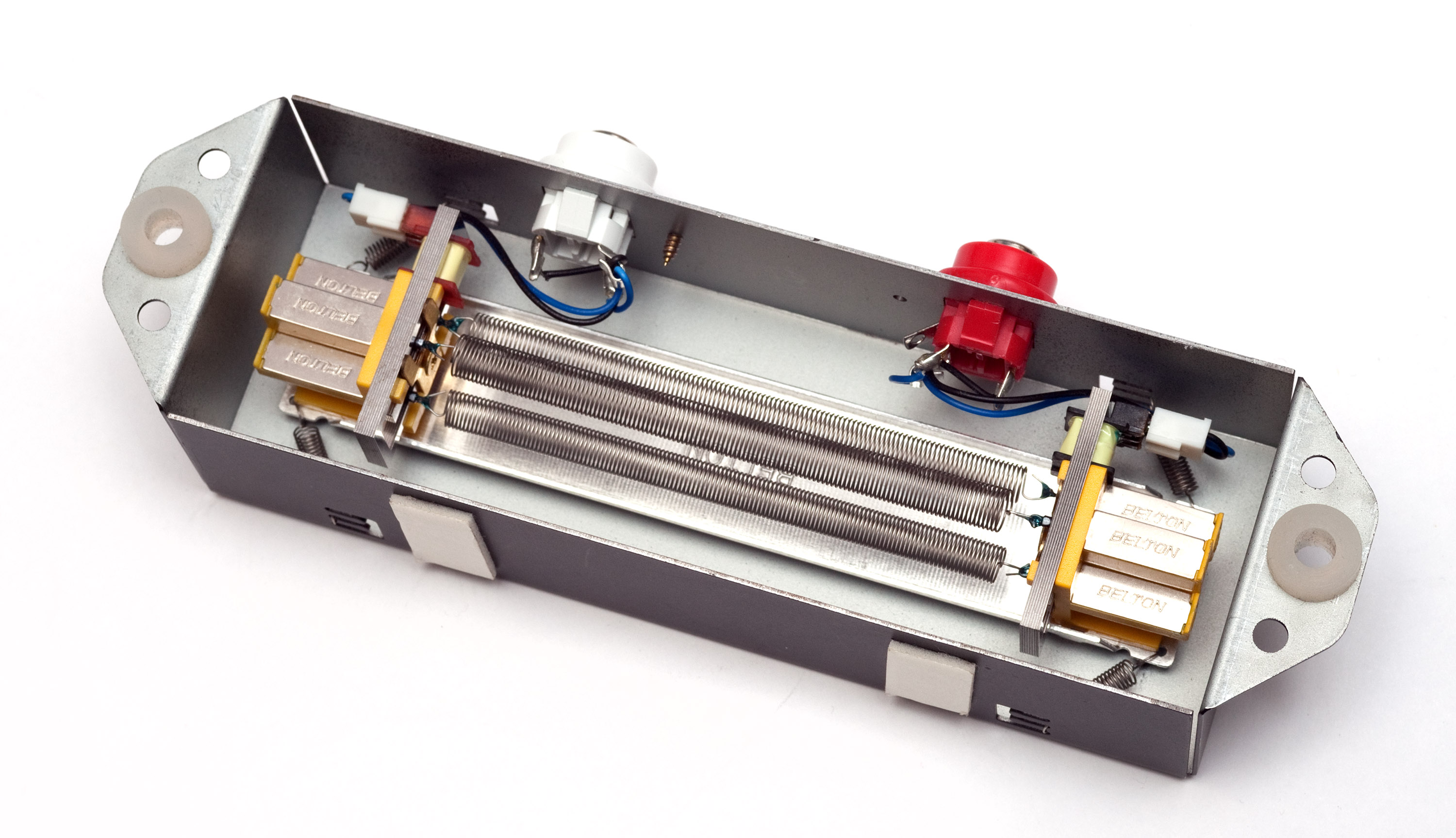
A spring reverb tank

Spring reverbs, introduced by Bell Labs, use a set of springs mounted inside a box. They work similarly to plate reverb, with a transducer and pickup placed at either end of the spring.

The American engineer Laurens Hammond of the Hammond company was granted a patent on a spring reverb system in 1939. Used by the Hammond company to add reverb to Hammond organs, circa 1941, early Hammond reverb units stood four feet tall. In 1959, the Hammond necklace reverb was about 13 inches wide, 1 inch deep and 14 inches tall. In 1960, the Hammond Type 4 reverb unit was no bigger than a brief case. Hammond moved reverb unit production to Hammond-owned Gibbs Manufacturing, then moved again to another Hammond unit, Accutronics, and developed smaller reverb units: the 2-spring Type 1 and the 3-spring Type 8. The Accutronics AccuVerb is an all-tube preamp stereo dual spring reverb unit, with versatile controls.

They became popular with guitarists, including surf musicians such as Dick Dale, as they could easily be built into guitar amplifiers. They were also used by dub reggae musicians such as King Tubby. Unique to spring reverb is a high-pitched, ping-like "drip" sound that carries immediately after notes, most noticeable when playing staccato.

=== Plate reverb ===
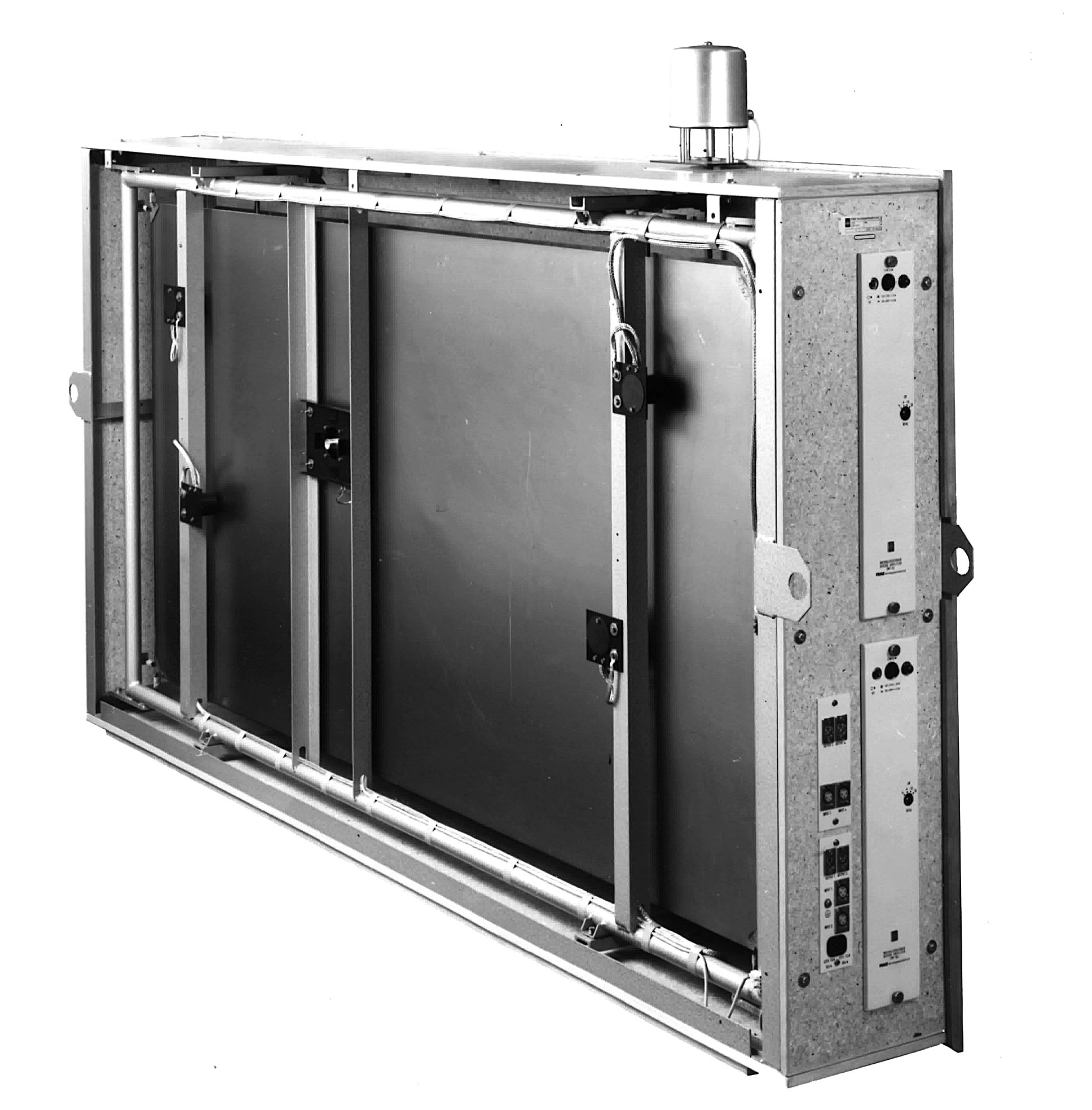
The EMT 140 plate reverb system

A plate reverb system uses an electromechanical transducer, similar to the driver in a loudspeaker, to create vibrations in a large plate of sheet metal. The plate's motion is picked up by one or more contact microphones whose output is an audio signal that may be added to the original "dry" signal. Plate reverb was introduced in the late 1950s by Elektromesstechnik with the EMT 140.

=== Digital reverb ===
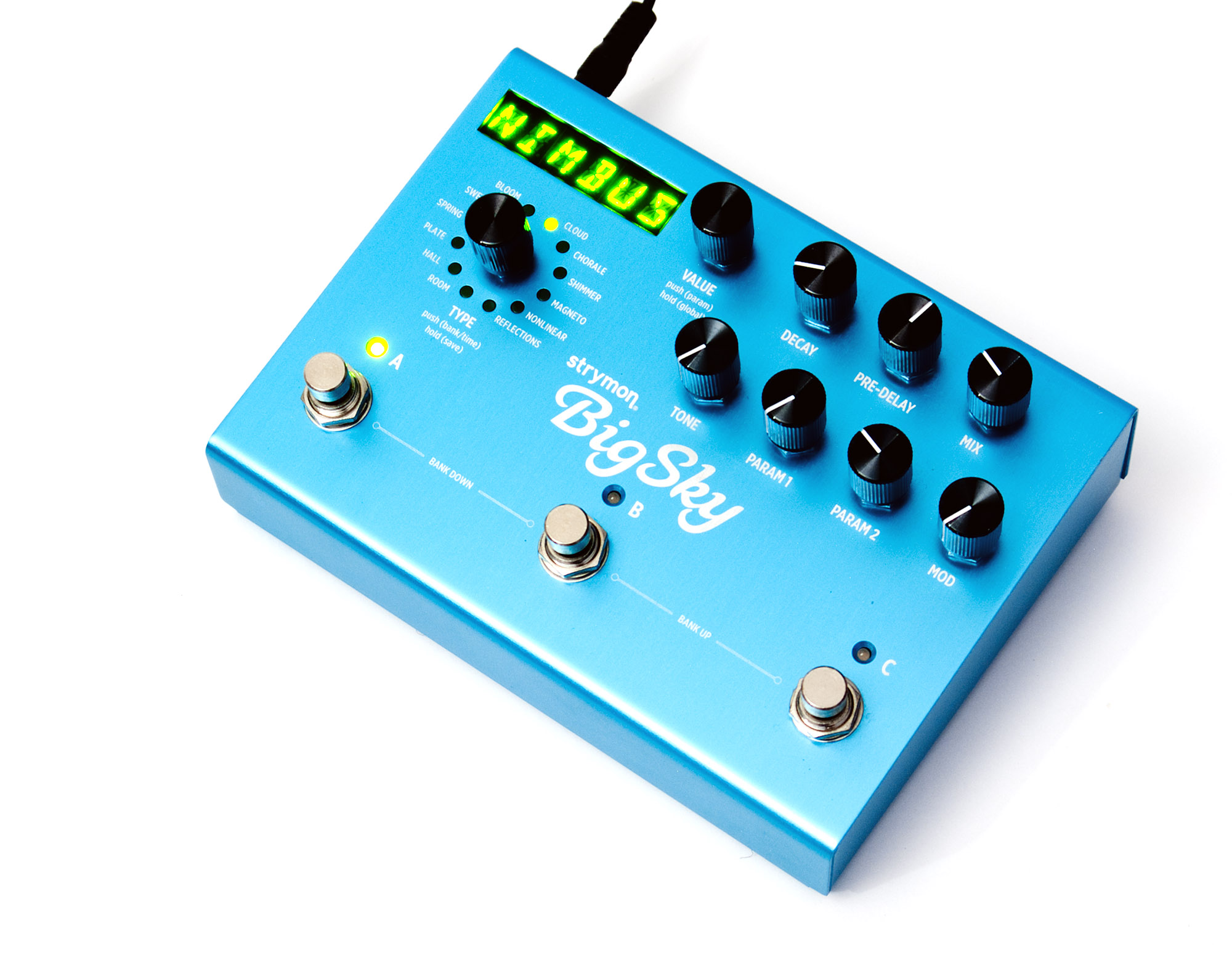
A Strymon BigSky digital reverb

Digital reverb units simulate reverb by using multiple delay lines with fading trails, giving the impression of sound bouncing off surfaces. Some digital effects allow users to independently adjust early and late reflections. Digital reverb was introduced in 1976 by EMT with the EMT 250, and became popular in the 1980s.

=== Gated reverb ===
Gated reverb combines reverb with a noise gate, creating a "large" sound with a short tail. It was pioneered by the English recording engineer Hugh Padgham and the drummer Phil Collins, and became a staple of 1980s pop music.

=== Convolution reverb ===
Convolution uses impulse responses to record the reverberation of physical spaces and recreate them digitally. The first real-time convolution reverb processor, the DRE S777, was announced by Sony in 1999. Convolution reverb is often used in film production, with sound engineers recording impulse responses of sets and locations so sounds can be added in post-production with realistic reverberation.

=== Shimmer reverb ===
Video demo of a digital reverb pedal, producing modulated reverb, octave up and octave down shimmer

Shimmer reverb alters the pitch of the reverberated sound, an effect often used in ambient music. It was pioneered by Brian Eno in the 1980s and popularized by the 1984 U2 album The Unforgettable Fire.
