= This Tiny World =

1972 film

- Produced by: Charles and Martina Huguenot van der Linden
- Release date: 1972
- Running time: 15 minutes
- Country: Netherlands
- Language: Dutch

This Tiny World (Dutch: Deze kleine wereld) is a 1972 Dutch short documentary film about antique mechanical toys, produced by Charles and Martina Huguenot van der Linden. It won an Oscar in 1973 for Documentary Short Subject.
