= Roullet & Decamps =

French toy company

Roullet & Decamps was a French toy manufacturing company operating in the 19th and 20th centuries, which specialized in automata. Founded in 1865 by Jean Roullet, the firm took the name Roullet-Decamps in 1889, 10 years after the marriage of the daughter of Jean Roullet to Ernest Decamps, a mechanical engineer by trade. The firm ceased operations in 1995. Collections of their wares are on exhibit to the public in two French museums in Falaise, Calvados and Souillac, Lot.

An automaton tiger was repaired by Steve Fletcher and David Burville in the season 4 episode 20 of the British TV show "The Repair Shop."
