= Thorens =

Swiss manufacturer of audio equipment

Thorens GmbH
- Type: GmbH
- Industry: Electronics
- Founded: 1883
- Headquarters: Bergisch Gladbach, Germany (since 2018)
- Key people: Heinz Rohrer; Gunter Kürten CEO (since May 2018)
- Products: Hi-fi equipment
- Website: www.thorens.com

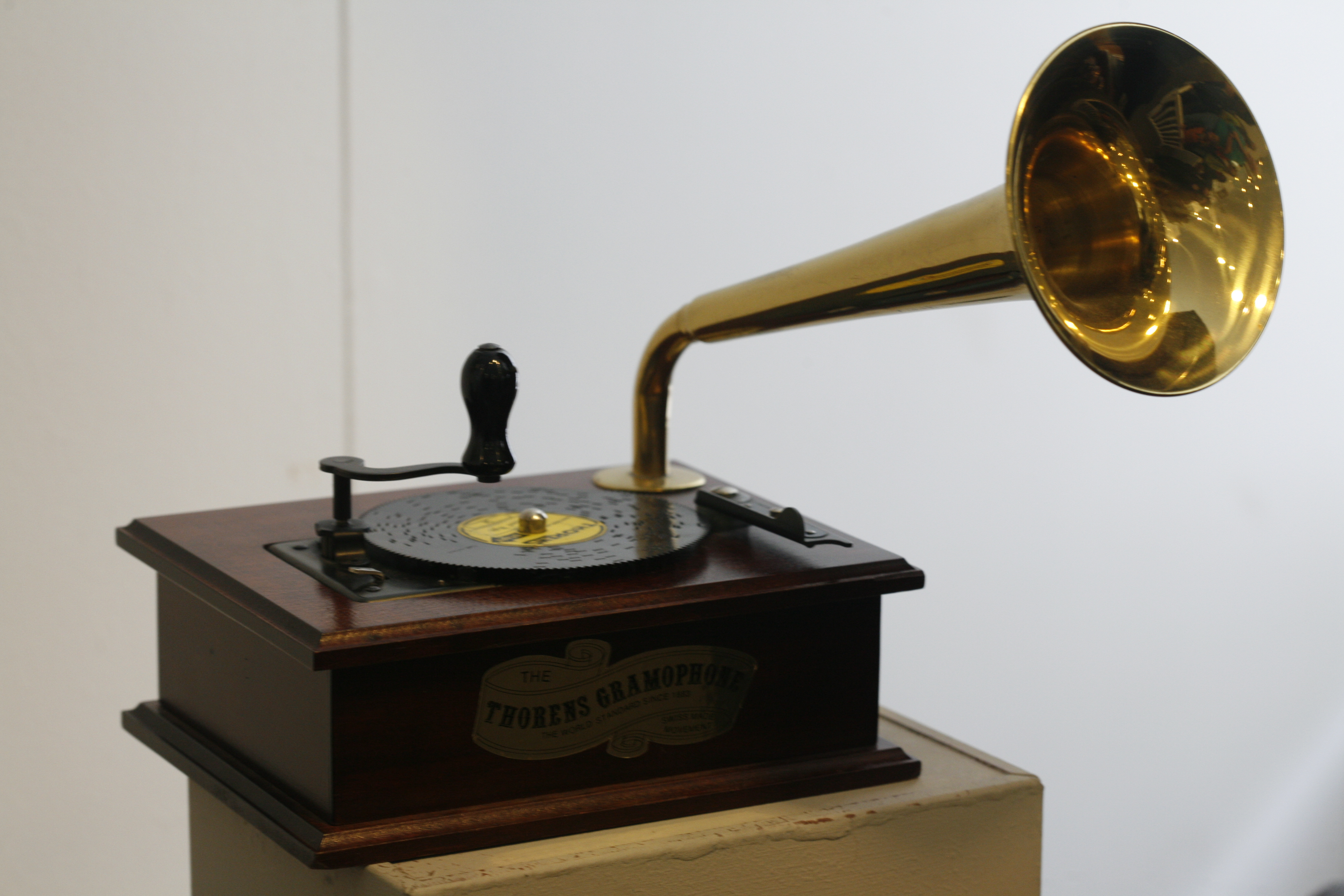
Early Thorens grammaphone (Musée d'automates et de boîtes à musique)

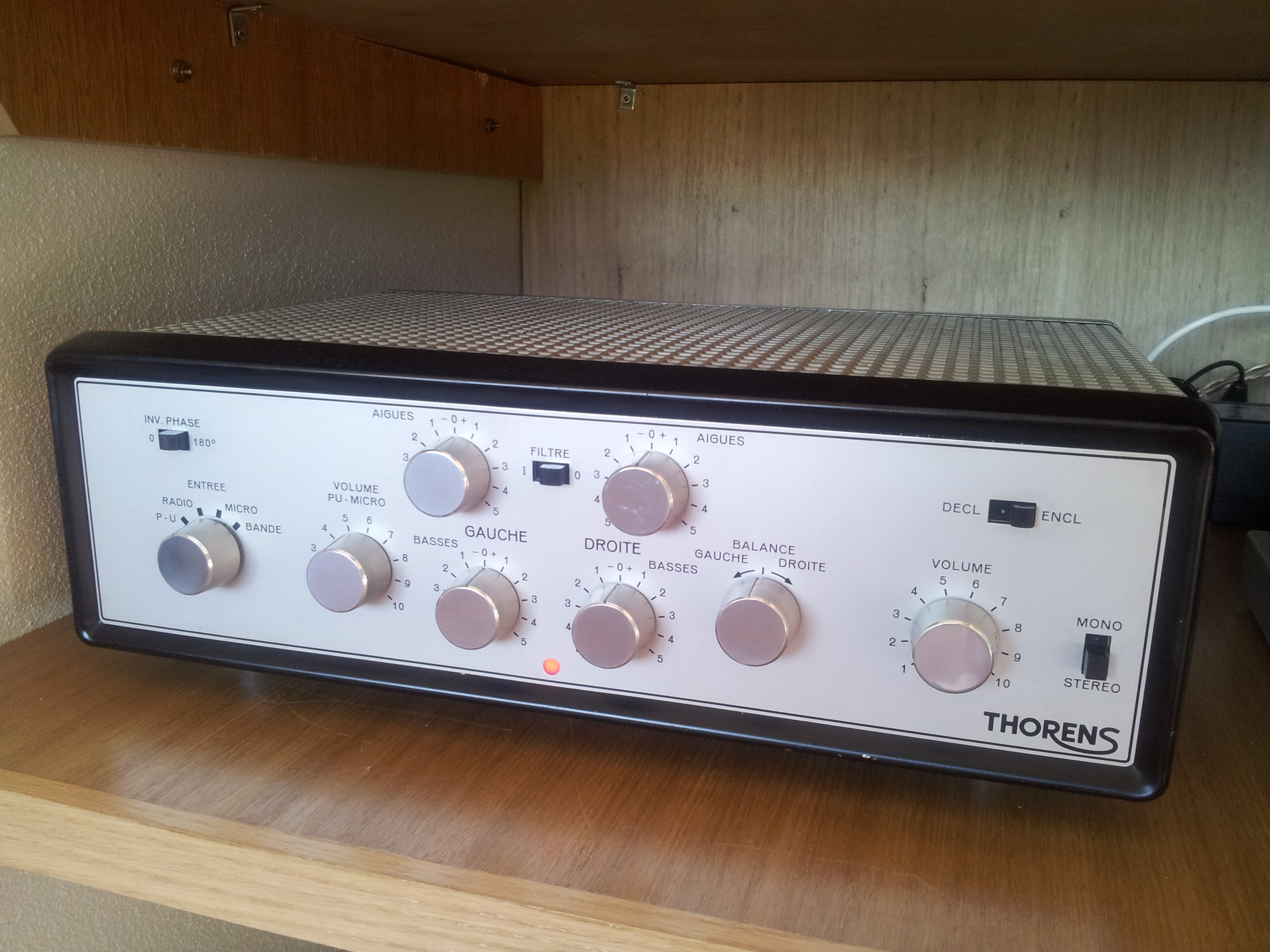
Thorens Tube Amplifier AZ25

Thorens is a formerly Swiss manufacturer of high-end audio equipment. Thorens is historically renowned for the range of phonographs (turntables) the manufacturer produces. In addition to audio playback equipment, Thorens is also a historical manufacturer of harmonicas and has been separately a producer of Swiss-made cigarette lighters, most notably the button actuated "Single Claw" and "Double Claw" lighters.

== History ==
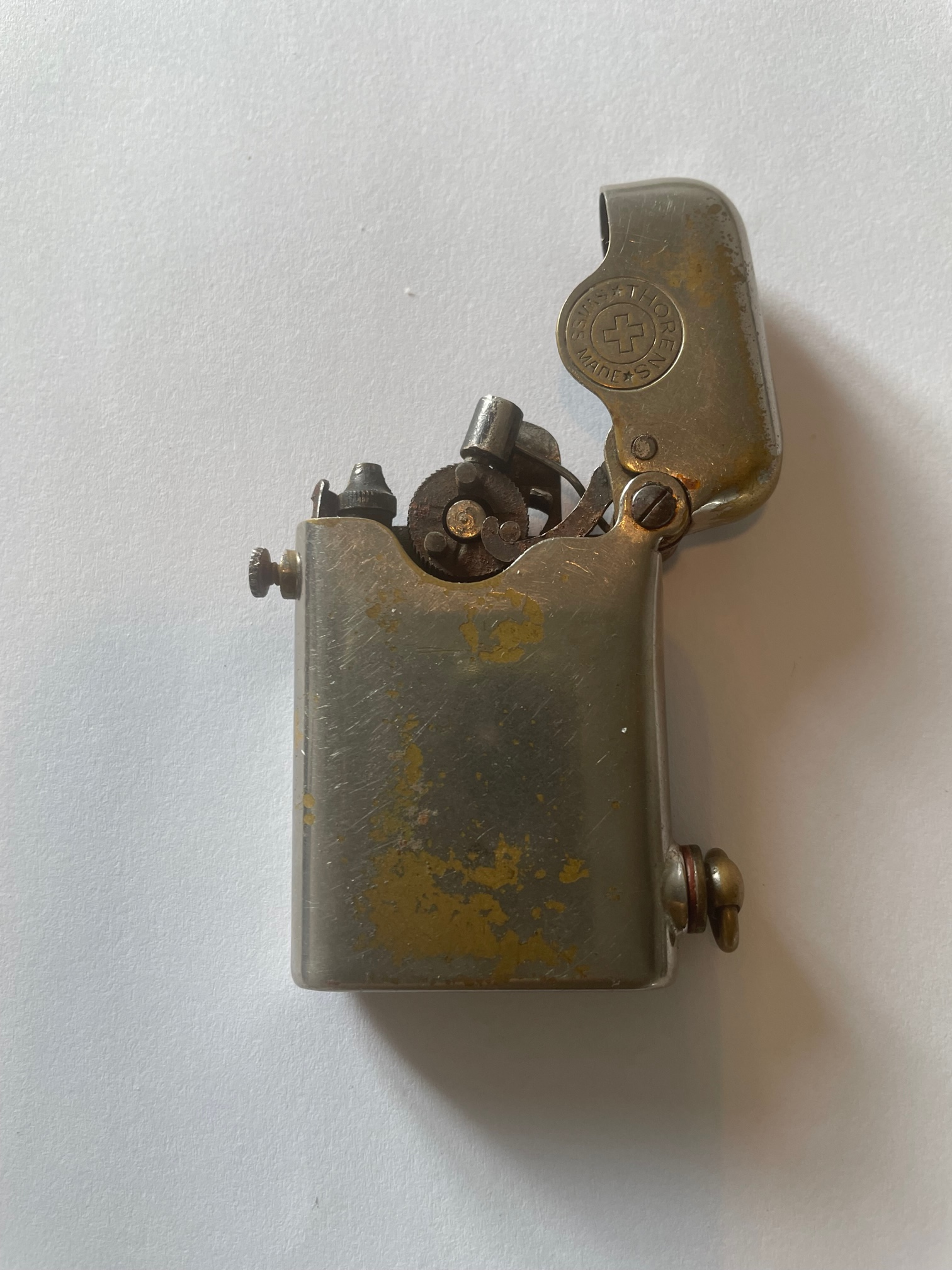
Thorens "Single Claw" cigarette lighter (1930s)

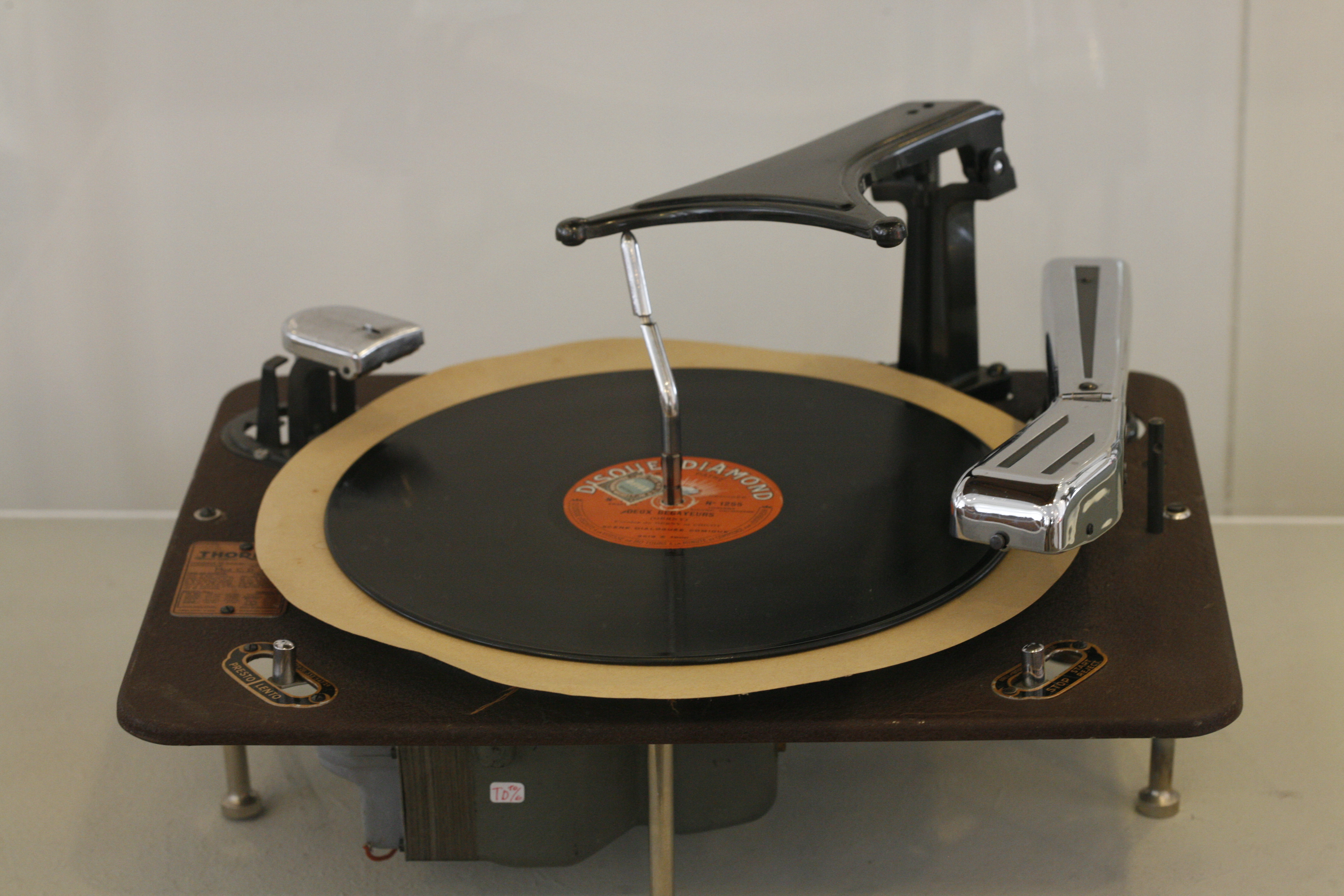
Thorens turntable (Musée d'automates et de boîtes à musique)

In 1883, the Thorens family business was first registered in Sainte-Croix (Ste-Croix), Vaud, Switzerland by Hermann Thorens. An initial producer of musical boxes and clock movements (which they were still producing in the 1950s), as well as cigarette lighters, they started producing Edison-type phonographs in 1903.

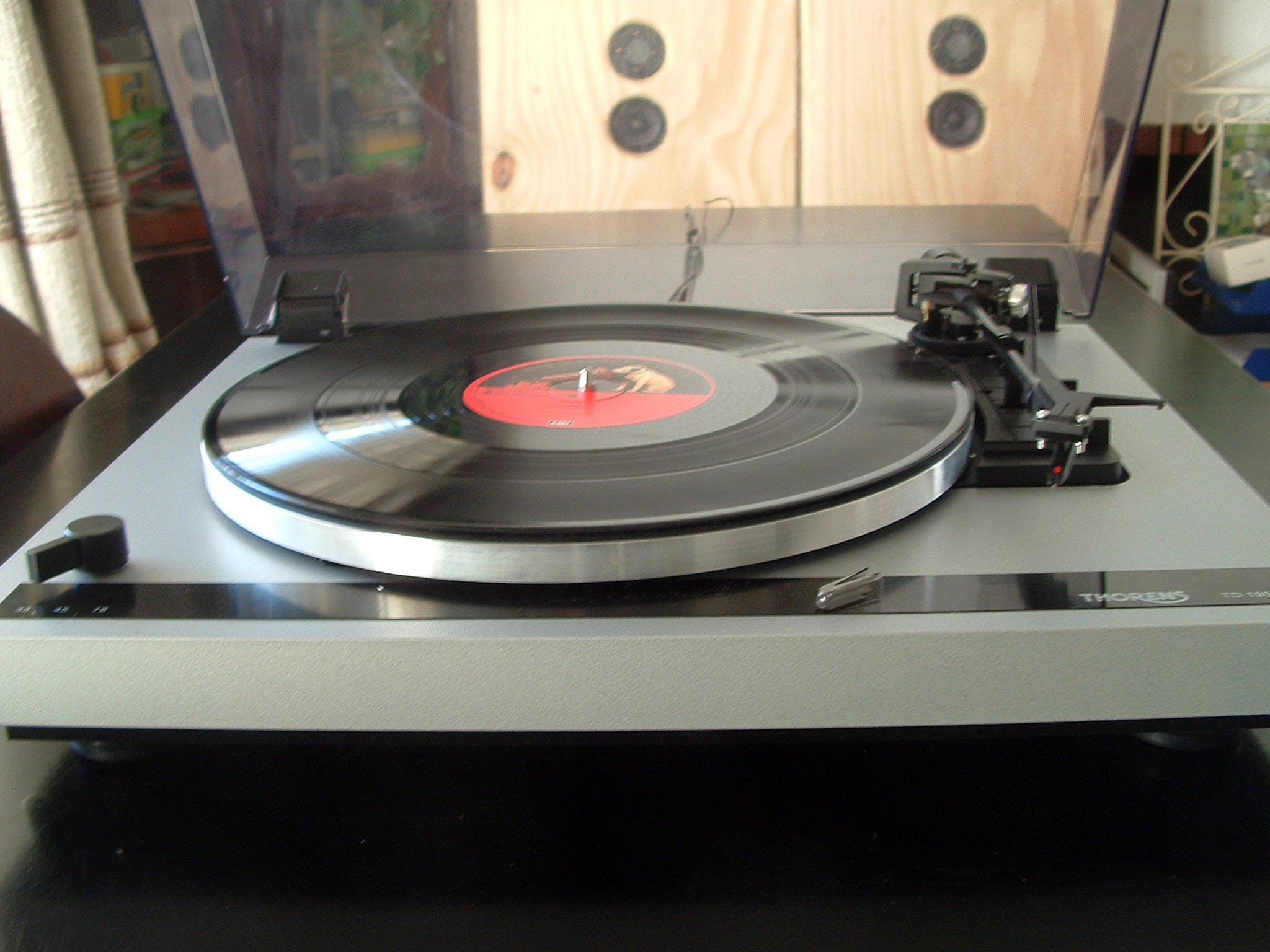
Thorens TD190-1 (first 190 since 1999)

In 1928, they produced their first electric (motor-drive) record player, and went on to produce a range of audiophile record players in the 1950s and 1960s which are, even today, regarded as high-end audio equipment, and are much sought-after, for example, the belt-driven and sub-chassis suspended TD 150 which was presented 1965. Its principle is also found in the Linn Sondek LP12. Its successor TD 160 appeared in 1972 and was built nearly without discontinuity for 20 years. With the TD 320 Thorens presented in 1984 changed the springs of the sub-chassis to laminated springs.

Although Thorens embarked on a cost-reduction effort in 1997, the company became insolvent in 1999. A new Suisse Thorens Export Company AG took over the assets and continued trading. The owner of the rights to the name was Heinz Rohrer.

From 1999 the less expensive TD 190/170, later the TD 190/170-1, without sub-chassis was offered, its design is similar to the more expensive Thorens-players.

First in 2004, Thorens presented a mass drive player the TD 850.

In 2012 Thorens got the EISA Award "best product 2011 / 2012" for the TD 309, a sub-chassis player with a three-point-suspension and a turntable made of glass.

In May 2018 Gunter Kürten, who had been manager at Denon and Elac, became CEO and relocated operations to Germany.

As of 2019, Thorens continues to produce turntables for the playback of vinyl and 78 rpm gramophone records.

== Gallery of record players ==
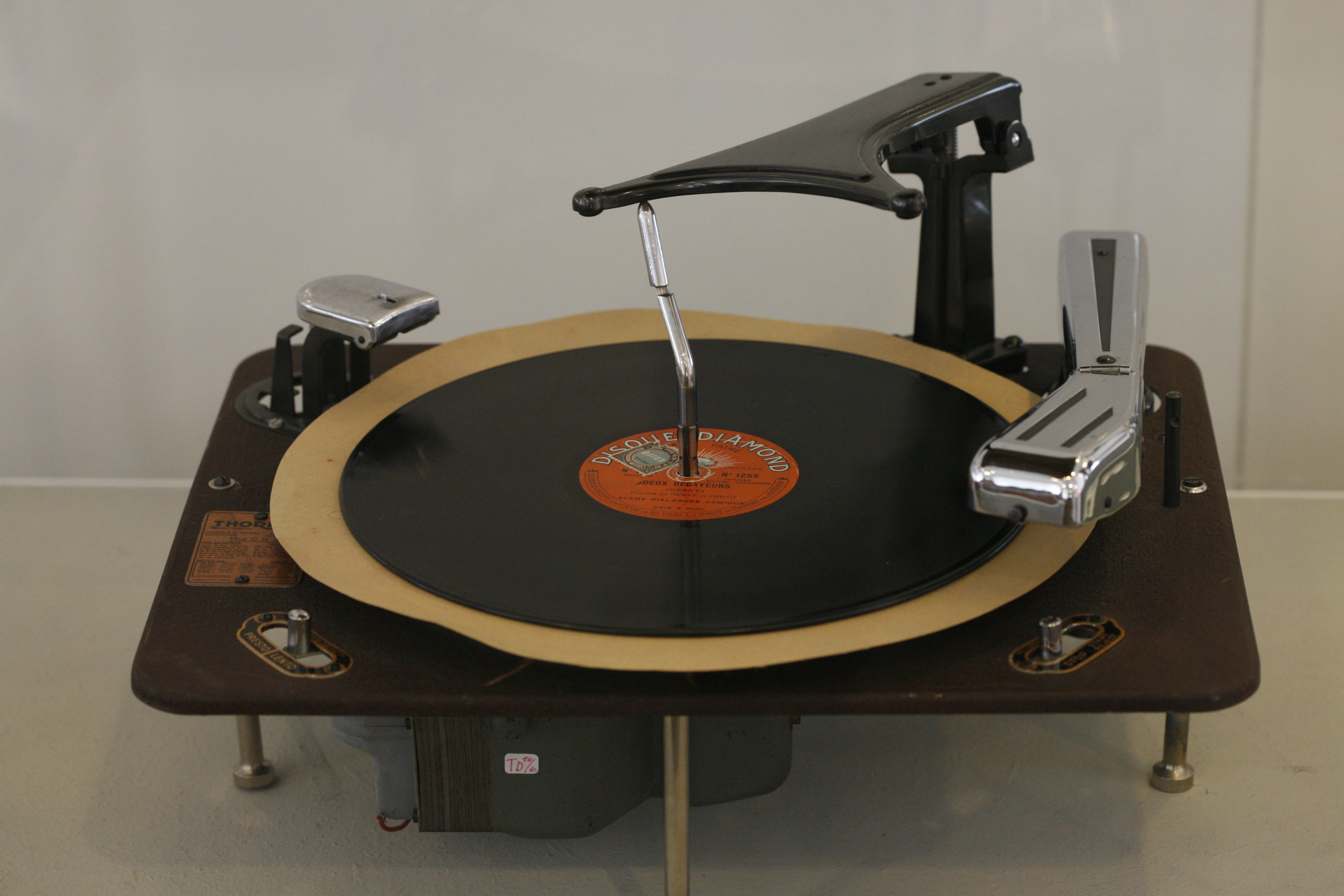
Thorens pladespiller
CIMA museum (Centre International de la Mécanique d'Art)

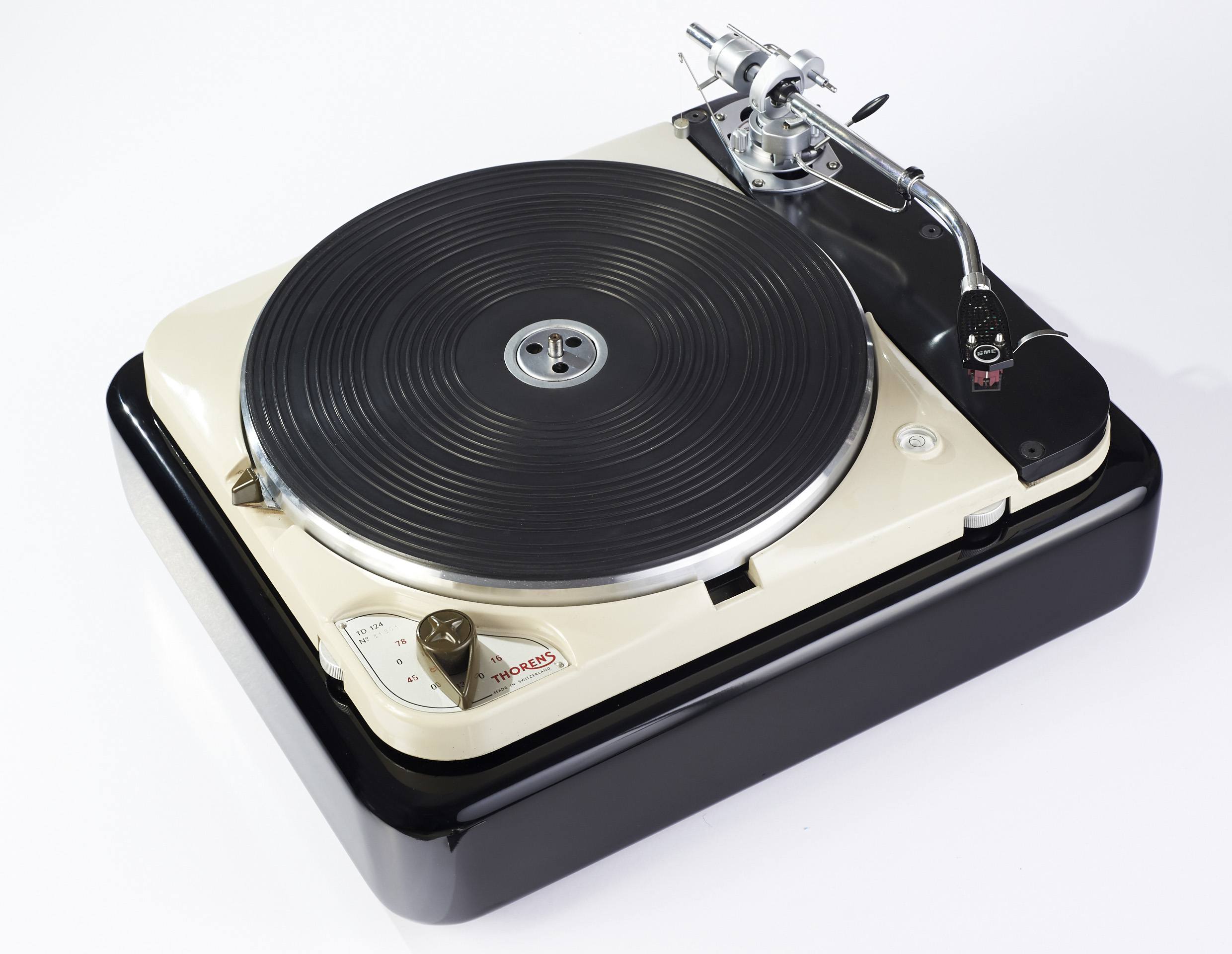
Thorens TD 124 (1957–1965)

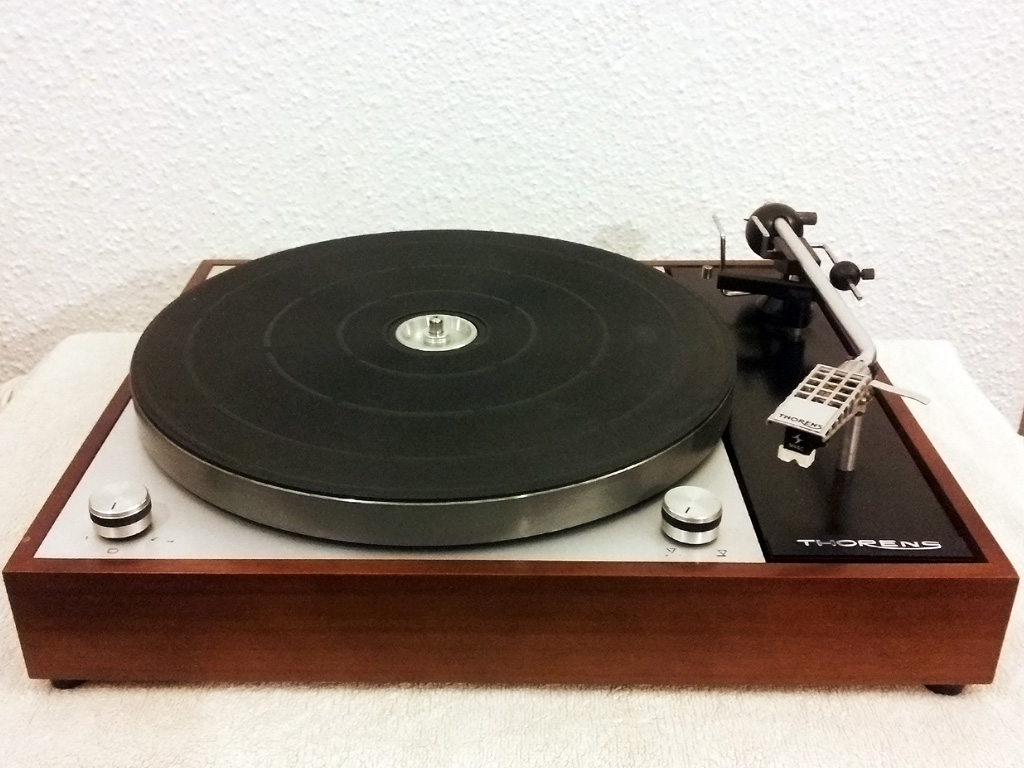
Thorens TD150 MkII with TP13a tonearm (1965–1972)

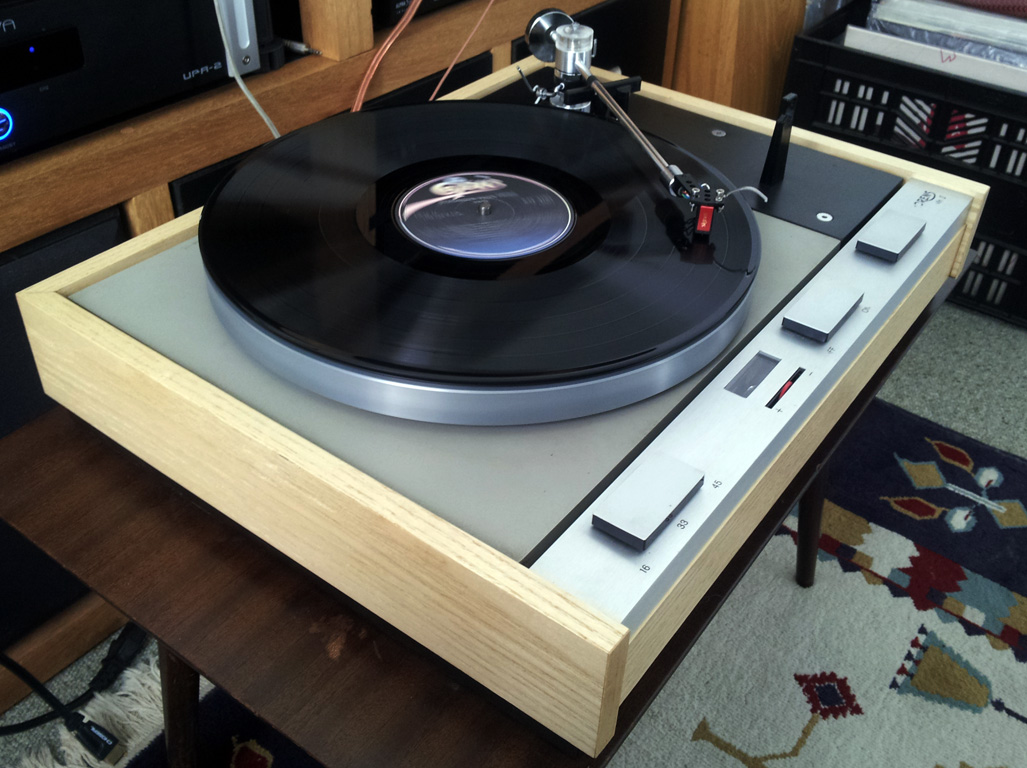
Thorens TD 125 Mk II (1972–1975)

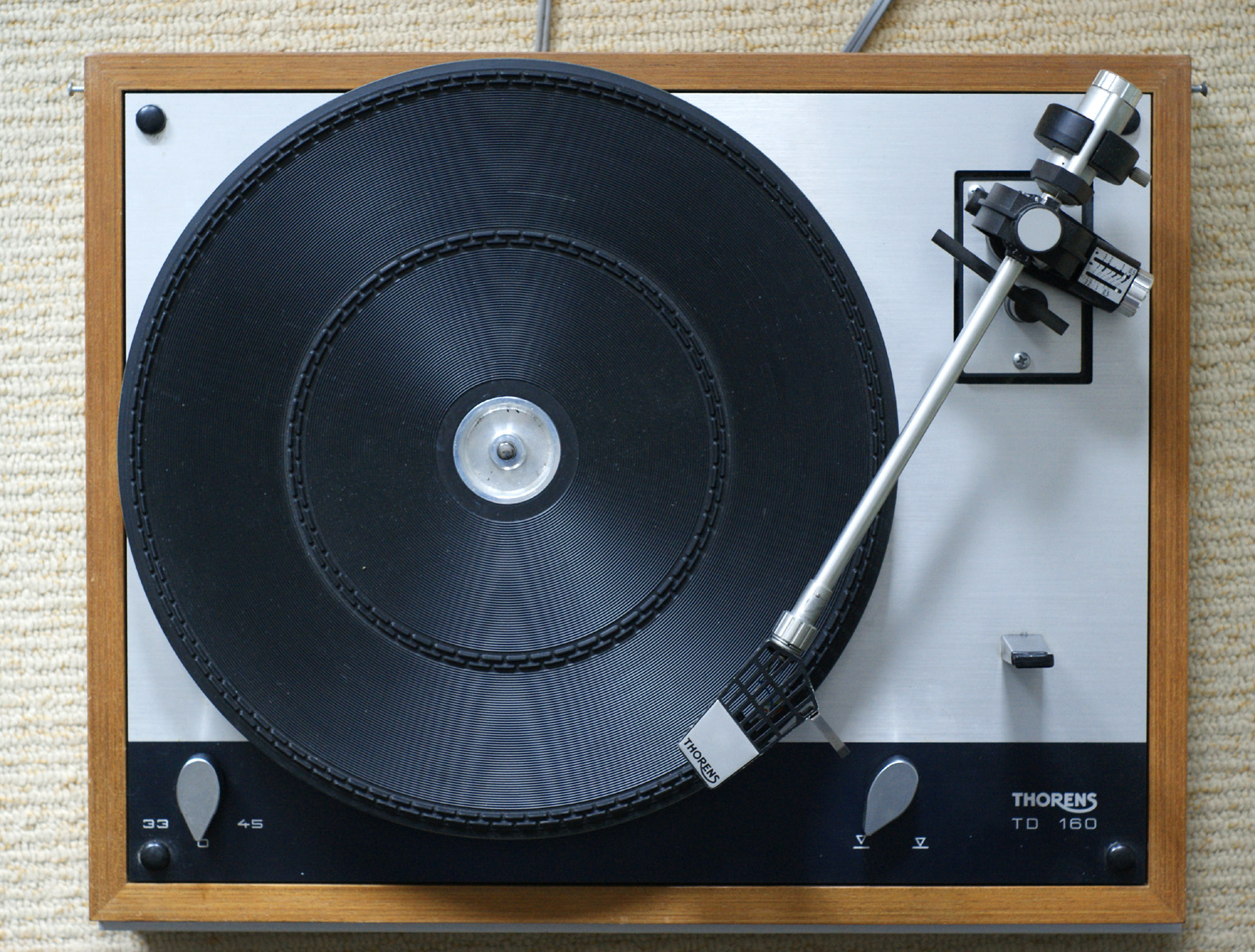
Thorens TD 160 (1972–1976)

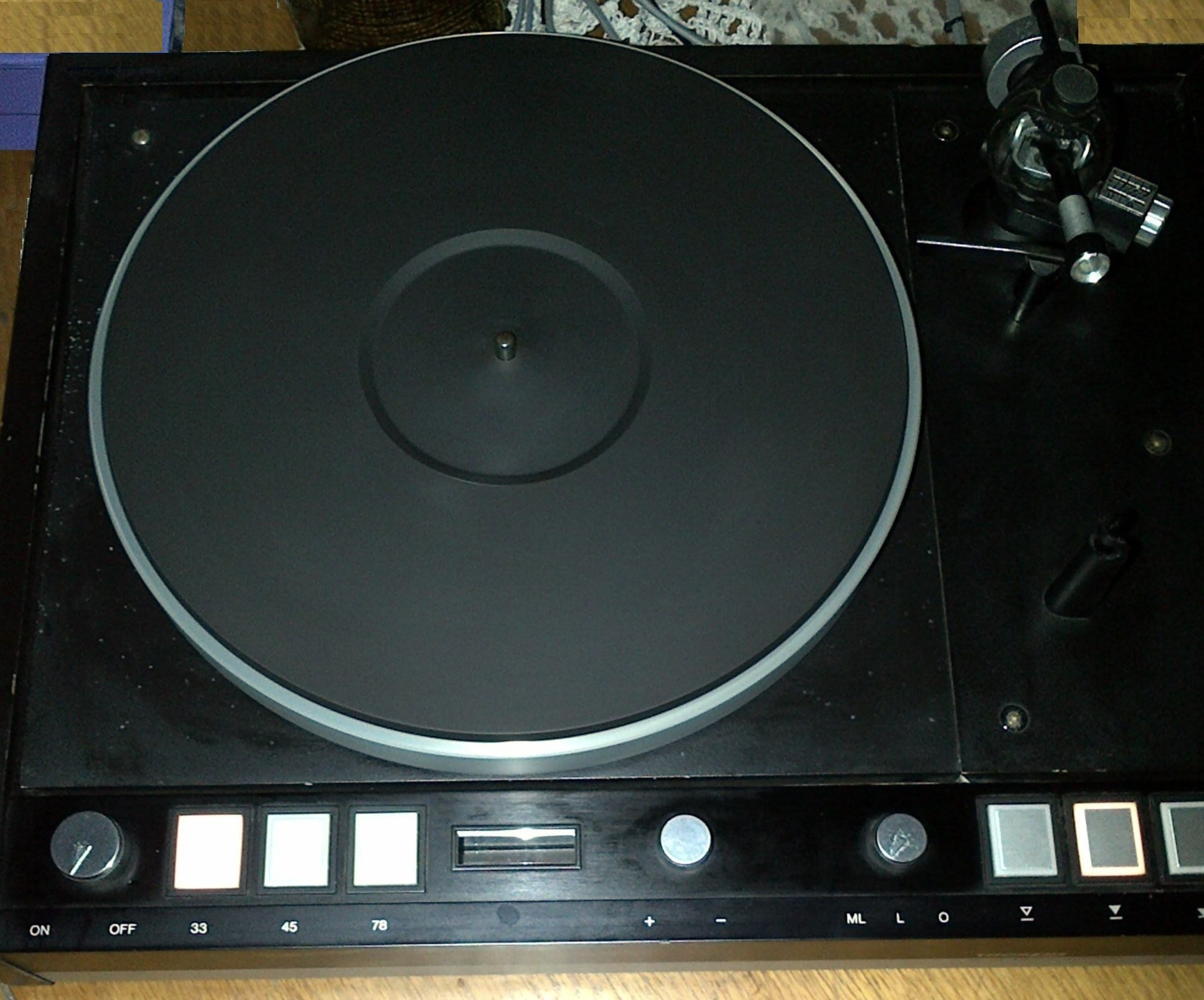
Thorens TD 126 Mk III (1979–1986)

== See also ==
- List of phonograph manufacturers
