= François-Joseph de Camus =

French mechanic (1672–1732)

François Joseph des Camus (14 September 1672 – 1732), a French mechanic, was born near Saint-Mihiel, France. After studying for the church, he devoted himself to mechanical inventions, a number of which he described in his Traité des forces mouvantes pour la pratique des arts et métiers, Paris, 1722.

He died in England in 1732.
