= Musée d'automates et de boîtes à musique =

Coordinates: 46.82071°N 6.50311°E

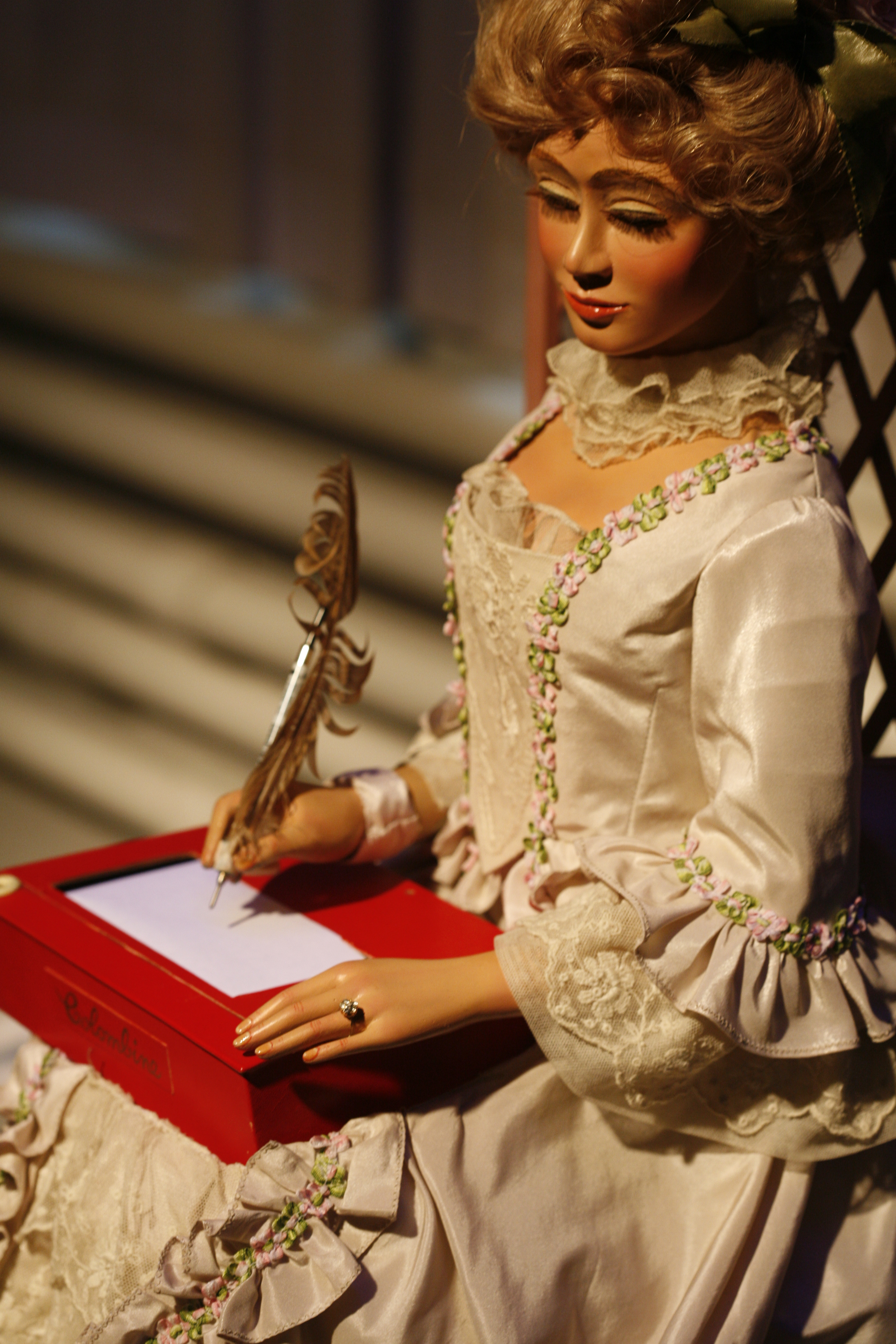
An automaton exhibited at CIMA

Musée d'automates et de boîtes à musique is a museum located in Sainte-Croix, Switzerland. It specialises in musical boxes and automatons. The museum is owned by the Centre International de la Mécanique d'Art (CIMA, "International Centre for Art Mechanics").

== See also ==
- List of music museums
- List of museums in Switzerland
