= Camus (name) =

Camus is a Basque surname, stage name, and given name. Notable people named Camus include:

== Given name ==
- Camus Celli, American songwriter, record producer, and entrepreneur

== Stage name ==
- Camus (musician), American singer and songwriter

== Surname ==
- Aimée Antoinette Camus (1879–1965), French botanist; daughter of Edmond Gustave Camus
- Albert Camus (1913–1960), a French Nobel Prize–winning author, philosopher, and journalist
- Armand-Gaston Camus (1740–1804), French Revolutionary leader
- Blanche-Augustine Camus (1884–1968), French painter; daughter of Edmond Gustave Camus
- Charles Étienne Louis Camus (1699–1768), French mathematician and mechanician
- Chico Camus (born 1985), American bantamweight mixed martial artist
- Edmond Gustave Camus (1852–1915), French pharmacist and botanist; father of Aimée Antoinette Camus and Blanche-Augustine Camus
- Elisabeth Camus, French racing cyclist
- Émile Le Camus (1839–1906), French Catholic bishop, theologian, and scripturist
- Étienne Le Camus (1632–1707), French cardinal
- Fabien Camus (born 1985), Tunisian footballer
- François-Joseph de Camus (1672–1732), French mechanic
- Giulio Camus (1847–1917), French botanist and entomologist
- Jean-Pierre Camus de Pontcarré (1584–1652), French bishop and writer
- Jules-Alexandre Duval Le Camus (1817–1878), French historical and scriptural painter; son of Pierre Duval Le Camus
- Jean-Yves Camus (born 1958), French political scientist
- Louis-Camus Destouches (1668–1726), French artillery officer
- Manuel Camus (1875–1949), Philippine lawyer and politician
- Marcel Camus (1912–1982), French film director and Golden Palm winner
- Mario Camus (1935–2021), Spanish screenwriter and film director
- Matilde Camus (1919–2012), Spanish poet, author, and researcher
- Nicolas Le Camus de Mézières (1721–1789), French architect and theoretician
- Philippe Camus (businessman) (born 1948), French businessman
- Philippe Camus (writer) (c. 15th-century), French writer and historian
- Pierre Duval Le Camus (1790–1854), French genre and portrait painter; father of Jules-Alexandre Duval Le Camus
- Renato Camus (1891–1971), Italian architect
- Renaud Camus (born 1946), French writer and right-wing activist
- Sébastien Le Camus (c. 1610–1677), French composer
- Thane Camus (born 1970), American expatriate television personality and actor in Japan
- Yves Camus (1930–2025), French sprinter
