= Camus (disambiguation) =

Albert Camus (1913–1960) was a French philosopher, writer, and journalist.

Camus or CAMUS may also refer to:

== People ==
- Camus (name), a given name and surname, including a list of people with the name
- Camus (folklore), an 11th-century legendary Scandinavian military leader
- Camus (musician), an American singer-songwriter

== Places ==
- Camus, County Galway, Ireland
- Camus, a townland in County Londonderry, Northern Ireland
- Camus, a townland and parish in County Tyrone, Northern Ireland
- Castle Camus or Knock Castle, a castle on the Isle of Skye, Scotland

== Other uses ==
- Camus people or Ilchamus people, a people of Kenya
- Camus Cognac, a brand of French cognac
- Royal Corps of Army Music (CAMUS), a corps of the British Army
- Camus, a fictional character in Meine Liebe
