= Philippe Camus =

Philippe Camus may refer to:

- Philippe Camus (businessman) (born 1948), French businessman
- Philippe Camus (writer), 15th-century writer
