= Adam Braseel =

American wrongfully convicted person

Adam Clyde Braseel (born April 5, 1983) is an American former UPS worker who spent 12 years in prison after being wrongfully convicted of a 2006 home invasion and murder in Grundy County, Tennessee. In December 2021, Tennessee Governor Bill Lee fully exonerated Braseel by executive clemency.

His case has been featured in popular podcasts such as This is Criminal, Generation Why, and news shows such as Ferrier Files.

== Alleged crime and arrest ==
At 9:52 PM, January 7, 2006, Grundy County Sheriff Department received an emergency call reporting an assault. Andrew Martin West, a patrol officer, drove to the home of 60-year-old Malcolm Burrows on the outskirts of Tracy City on Melisa Rock Road. Sergeant Mike Brown arrived and found 59-year-old Becky Hill, Burrows's sister, badly beaten. Hill's 33-year-old son Kirk Braden told Brown he had been sleeping when he heard his mother scream. Braden said he woke up and fought off an intruder assaulting his mother. He described the assailant as a red haired man, of medium build, someone he'd never seen before. Hill said the same man had been at the house 30 minutes earlier and had told Burrows that his car had broken down nearby. She said Burrows drove off with the man in her Chrysler Fifth Avenue to go fix it. She said the same man came back alone and beat her. Burrows's body was later found in a wooded area near the Chrysler.

A neighbor, Angela White, told investigators she had seen a "gold, shiny, new model car" parked facing towards the Burrows residence.

That same weekend, Adam Braseel was visiting his friends, the Seagroves family, at their house in Coalmont, approximately 15 miles (24 km) from Tracy City. The next day, Sheriff Brent Myers arrived at the Seagroves residence and confiscated the gold-colored Acura that Braseel had driven from his home in Franklin County. Sheriff Myers took Braseel's photograph and several articles of clothing to be tested along with his car at the TBI Lab in Nashville. Braseel was free to go.

Sheriff Myers arrested Braseel on January 18, 2006, after Braden and Hill identified Braseel as the intruder from a photographic lineup. Braseel was indicted for first degree murder, attempted murder, especially aggravated robbery, attempted murder, aggravated assault, aggravated burglary, and assault.

== Trial ==
Braseel's two-day trial began on November 7, 2007, at the Grundy County Courthouse in Altamont. Prosecutors presented the attack as a calculated, brutal plan to steal a wallet.

Becky Hill testified that, at approximately 9:15 PM, a red-haired man came to the house and said that his car broke down, and that Malcolm Burrows and the red-haired man drove off in her Chrysler. She said the same man came back alone and asked her to get starting fluid from under the sink, and when she bent down to look for it, he beat her over the head with a metallic object. Her son, Kirk Braden, testified that he was asleep and was woken up by his mother's screaming and fought the man off. He said the man ran out of the house and drove off in a gold-colored car with a sunroof and a dent on the driverside fender.

Hill identified Braseel as being both the man who came to the door, and the man who came back and attacked her. Braden identified Braseel as his mother's attacker and identified Braseel's car.

A neighbor, Jeff White, testified that Braden had told him that he had not seen a car at all and that the man had run off on foot. White was certain of this and was scared for his family's safety, because this would mean that there was a murderer on the loose in the neighborhood.

Deputy Andrew West testified that Sergeant Mike Brown of the Grundy County Sheriff's department first discovered Burrows's body besides the Chrysler. TBI investigator Larry Davis was subsequently called.

Hill stated that Mr. Burrows had approximately $800 in his wallet on the night he was killed which included approximately $400 or $500 of her money which she had given to Burrows for safekeeping.

Agent Davis stated he was notified at 1:00 AM, and that when he arrived, Burrows did not have a wallet in his pocket.

In his closing argument, Prosecutor Steve Strain claimed that the stolen wallet was the motive of the murder. Braseel was convicted by the jury, and he received an effective sentence of life with the possibility of parole after a minimum of 51 years.

== Investigation ==
Blogger and filmmaker David K. Sale is credited for reviving the case for Adam Braseel's innocence. Sale saw the efforts of Adam's sister Christina Braseel to free her brother, and together they uncovered significant problems in the state's evidence.

To investigate the case, Sale held auditions for a horror movie in Grundy County. By talking to people in the county, he discovered a key mistake in the initial investigation that could reopen the case. It turned out that Burrows's wallet, the supposed motive of the crime, was not stolen at all. Sgt. Mike Brown, the first man on the scene of the murder, told WZTV that he was willing to testify at the trial that the wallet was not stolen, but that the District Attorney had not called him to the stand, saying that "they had it covered". Brown corresponded with Sale from his house in Florida, having retired months after the murder.

Brown did appear at the 2019 coram nobis hearings, where he testified that the wallet was in Burrows's back pocket when his body was found. He also testified that, at the time, he had submitted a report about finding the body and the wallet. When asked if the sheriff's department intentionally lost his report to conceal evidence, Brown answered, "it wouldn't be unusual."

Sale wrote extensively about how the stolen wallet was invented to hide a motive that was not brought to light at trial: Burrows was a well-known drug dealer, trafficking in opioids while leading a dual existence as an alderman. Sale's allegations were backed up by Knoxville journalist Matt Lakin.

Sale said Brown's report wasn't the only thing that went missing: when first investigating the case back in late 2014, Sale was told by the new Grundy County sheriff Clint Shrum in emails that all the files from the Braseel case were gone. Shrum later told Lakin that, when he took office, all the files were gone, "There was nothing but a pencil."

Sale uncovered evidence that Malcolm Burrows was involved with others in the drug trade who would have had a motive to kill over money. Adam Braseel had no connection to anyone in the drug trade.

== Post-conviction ==
Adam's first appeal was handled by his trial attorneys, it was turned down in 2011.

=== 2015 hearing ===
A petition for post-conviction relief was filed in Grundy County Circuit Court. Newly-elected Judge Justin Angel decided to review the case and grant an evidentiary hearing. On December 25, 2015, Braseel's convictions were voided and he was granted a new trial. Judge Angel ruled that single-photo eyewitness identifications were unconstitutional in Tennessee, noting that Braseel's attorneys neither motioned to suppress the identification or made an objection to that effect during the trial. Judge Angel said that the witness identifications themselves were flawed. Since the state's case hinged on the witness identifications, this seriously endangered the case against Braseel. Braseel was freed on bond, on January 8, 2016.

On October 7, 2016, the Tennessee Court of Criminal Appeals reversed Angel's ruling and reinstated Braseel's conviction. The court opined that when Braden selected Braseel from a single photo, it was admissible because it was the first photo on the stack. The appeals court also said that, despite the fact that the trial judge's instructions to the jury were deficient, they were harmless and would not have made a difference. Adam Braseel went back to prison on October 11, 2016.

Sale contacted attorney Alex Little who took the case and provided was provided with new evidence and witnesses. On May 23, 2017, Little filed a writ of coram nobis back to Judge Angel, as well as a Federal habeas corpus to Justice Curtis Lynn Collier of the District Court of Eastern Tennessee. Collier ordered a stay of federal proceedings, pending the outcome at the circuit court. The Federal appeal was where Sale's evidence that Burrows was involved in the opioid trade would come in, as well as information from a juror in the original trial, who came forward and said that they felt intimidated by the foreman. The juror alleged that the foreman stated to the jurors during deliberation that they "[shouldn't] worry. If Adam is innocent, he can fix it on appeal." After the foreman made that statement, several jurors changed their votes to guilty. The petitions also included Brown's affidavit about the wallet.

The petition also alleged that Sheriff Myers had altered a witness statement made by Jay Douglas. Douglas told Myers that he saw a tall, white man with dark hair talking to Burrows. He was with a blonde female, in a gold or tan colored car. In his report, Myers had changed the description, writing "[Douglas] told me that the subject in the car was a white male with red hair." Adam had red hair. This was information that Sale had put together at the beginning, after finding Jay Douglas's original statement and publishing it on his website.

Prosecutor Steve Strain tabled a motion for Angel to recuse himself, which he refused. Strain then tabled a motion to disallow Brown from testifying, which was denied. Only when Brown was set to testify, Strain revealed that, a year and half ago, the state had re-examined a fingerprint found on the passenger side of the car Burrows drove to help the killer. The print was matched to Kermit Bryson, an alleged perpetrator in the 2018 killing of Grundy County deputy Shane Tate. Bryson fled, and after a lengthy manhunt, was found mortally wounded with the same weapon that killed Tate. Alex Little amended the appeal, and built a case around Bryson.

=== 2019 hearing ===
At the 2019 corum nobis hearings, Elizabeth Rector testified that Kermit Bryson told her he was part of Burrows's Killing and told her he had been put up to it by a nurse practitioner.

After Brown and Rector testified, District Attorney Mike Taylor offered Braseel a deal to walk free if he pleaded no contest, which he took.

== Exoneration ==
In 2020, a hearing in front of the parole board resulted in a unanimous recommendation to the governor that he exonerate Adam Braseel. In December 2021, Governor Bill Lee of Tennessee granted Adam Braseel a full exoneration on all charges.

Adam Braseel is currently represented by Kathleen Zellner. In 2022, Braseel sued Grundy County, alleging that the prosecution intentionally framed him for the murder.

== External sources ==
- Legal documents
  - 2010 conviction: State of Tennessee v. Adam Clyde Braseel, M2009-00839-CCA-R3-CD (Nashville Criminal Court of Appeals September 17, 2010), archived from the original on 2022-11-12.
  - 2016 appeal to 2015 ruling: Adam C. Braseel v. State of Tennessee, M2016-00057-CCA-R3-PC (Tennessee Court of Criminal Appeals October 7, 2016), archived from the original on 2017-02-18.
  - 2017 petition for writ of habeas corpus: Adam Braseel v. Darren Settles, Petition for Writ of Habeas Corpus (United States District Court for the Eastern District of Tennessee). (PACER)
  - 2022 wrongful arrest lawsuit: Adam Braseel v. Grundy County, Tennessee; Estate of Brent Myers; Lonnie Cleek, 22-cv-298 (United States District Court for the Eastern District of Tennessee February 13, 2024), archived from the original on 2025-10-14.
