= Jean Bourdichon =

French miniature painter and manuscript illuminator (c.1457/1459-1521)

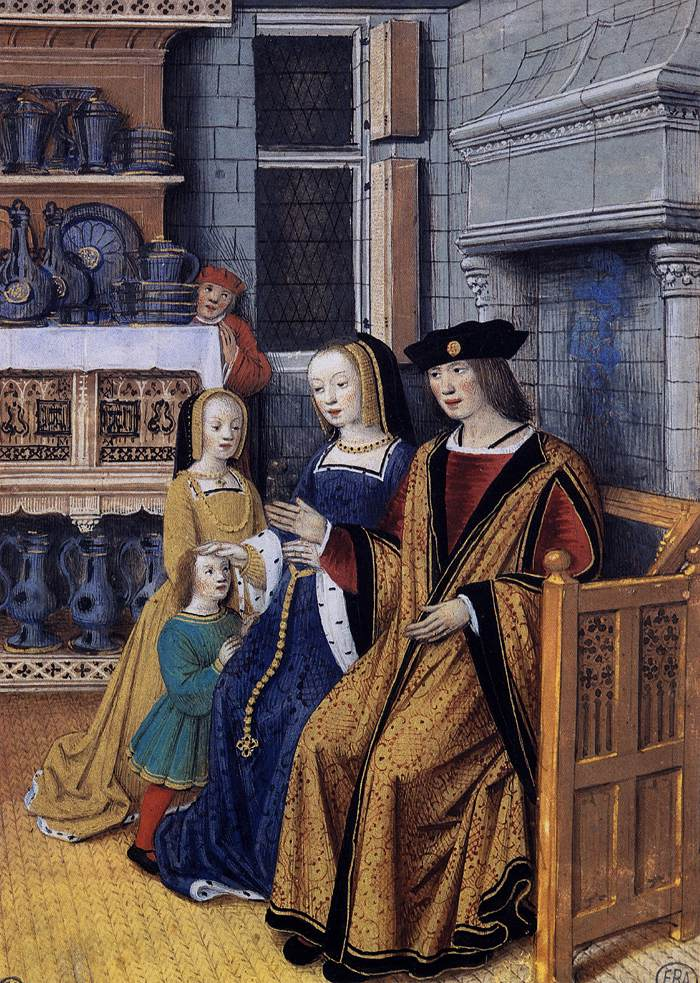
Miniature, The Wealthy Man, École nationale supérieure des Beaux-Arts, Paris

Jean Bourdichon (1457 or 1459 – 1521) was a French painter and manuscript illuminator at the court of France between the end of the 15th century and the start of the 16th century, in the reigns of Louis XI, Charles VIII, Louis XII, and Francis I. He was probably born in Tours, and was a pupil of Jean Fouquet. He died in Tours.

== Paintings ==
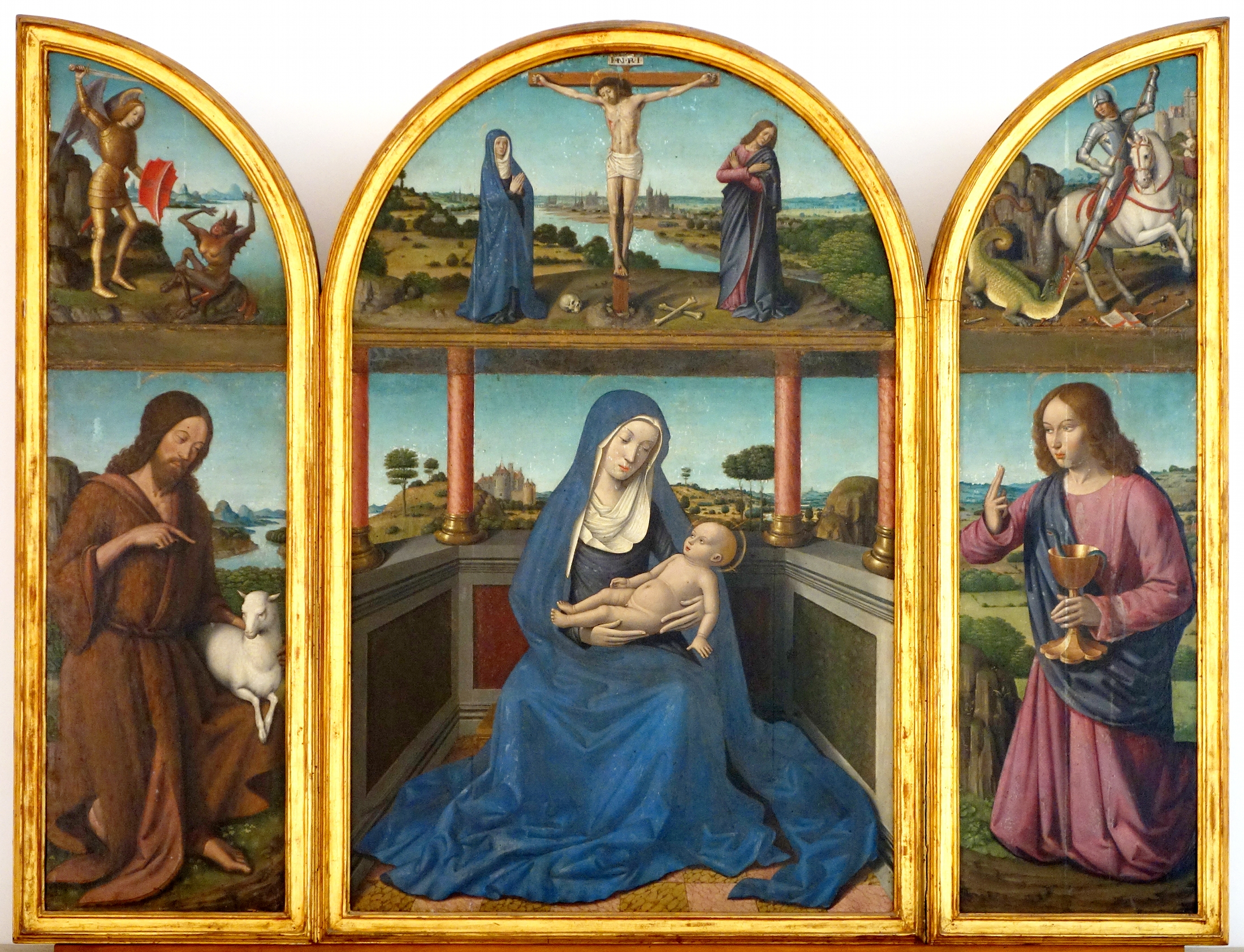
Triptych of the Virgin and Child between Saint John the Baptist and Saint John the Evangelist, Certosa di San Martino, Naples.

- Portrait of Saint Francis of Paola, sent by king Francis I to pope Leo X, engraved by Michel Lasne.
- Triptych of the Virgin and Child between Saint John the Baptist and Saint John the Evangelist, oil on panel, 114 x 150 cm, Certosa di San Martino, Naples.
- Entombment of Christ, oil on panel, église Saint-Pierre-Saint-Paul, Gonesse or by an imitator of Bourdichon and Jean Poyer.
- Diptych of Christ Blessing and Virgin in Prayer (Vierge en oraison), oil on panel, Musée des beaux-arts de Tours.
- Vierge en oraison, oil on panel, Sam Fogg collection, London, formerly in Riga.
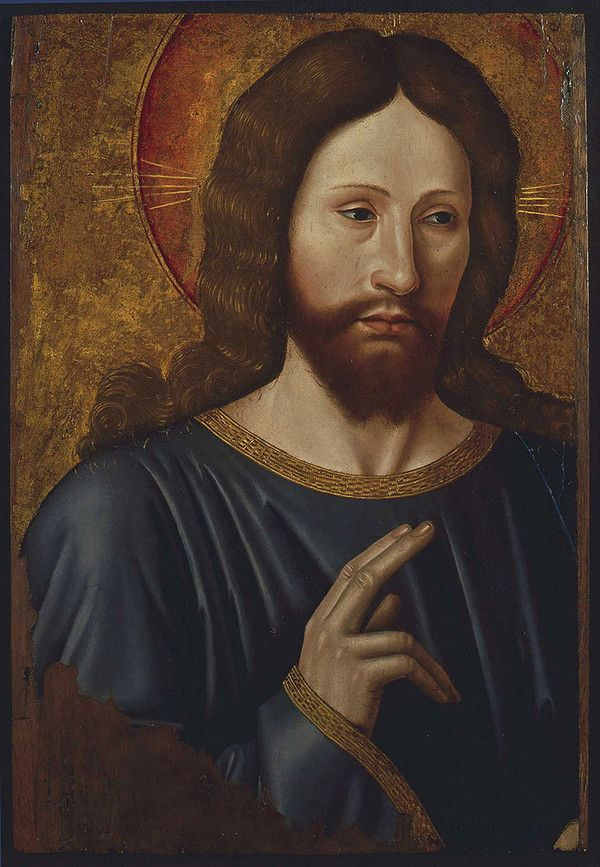
Christ Blessing, Musée des beaux-arts de Tours.

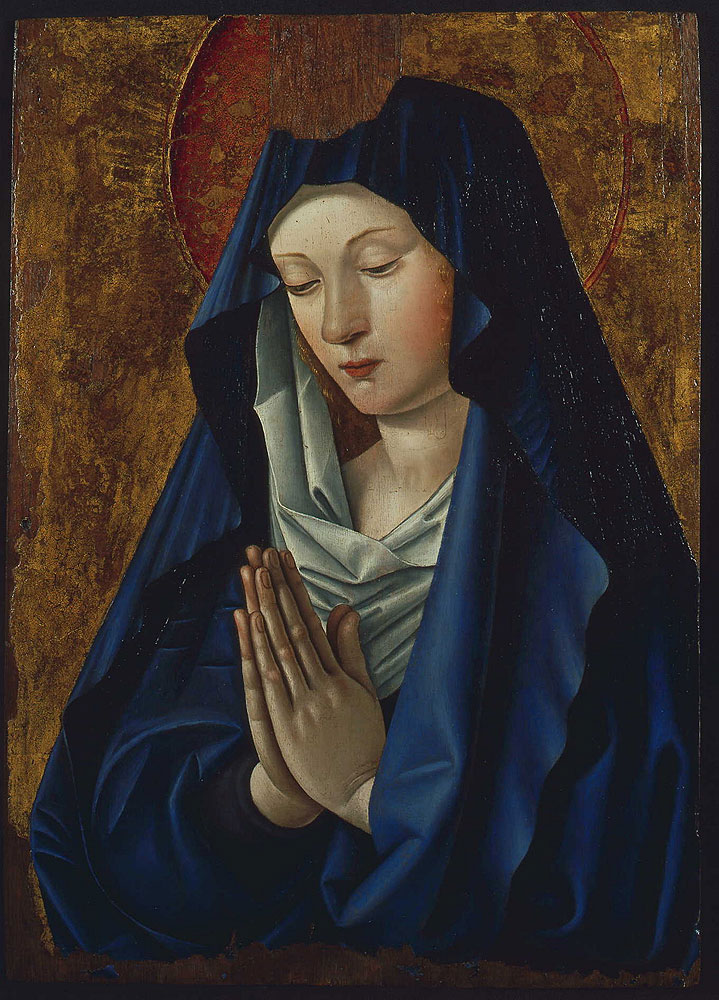
Vierge en oraison, Musée des beaux-arts de Tours.

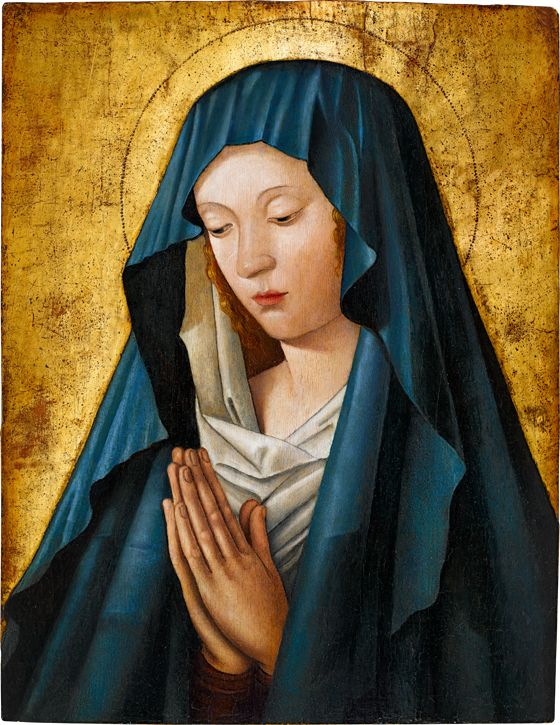
Vierge en oraison, Sam Fogg collection, London.

== Manuscripts ==
Two of Bourdichon's most famous works are the Hours of Louis XII (now dispersed, begun 1498) and the Grandes Heures of Anne of Brittany for Louis's queen.
