= Camus (musician) =

American singer-songwriter

David Sale
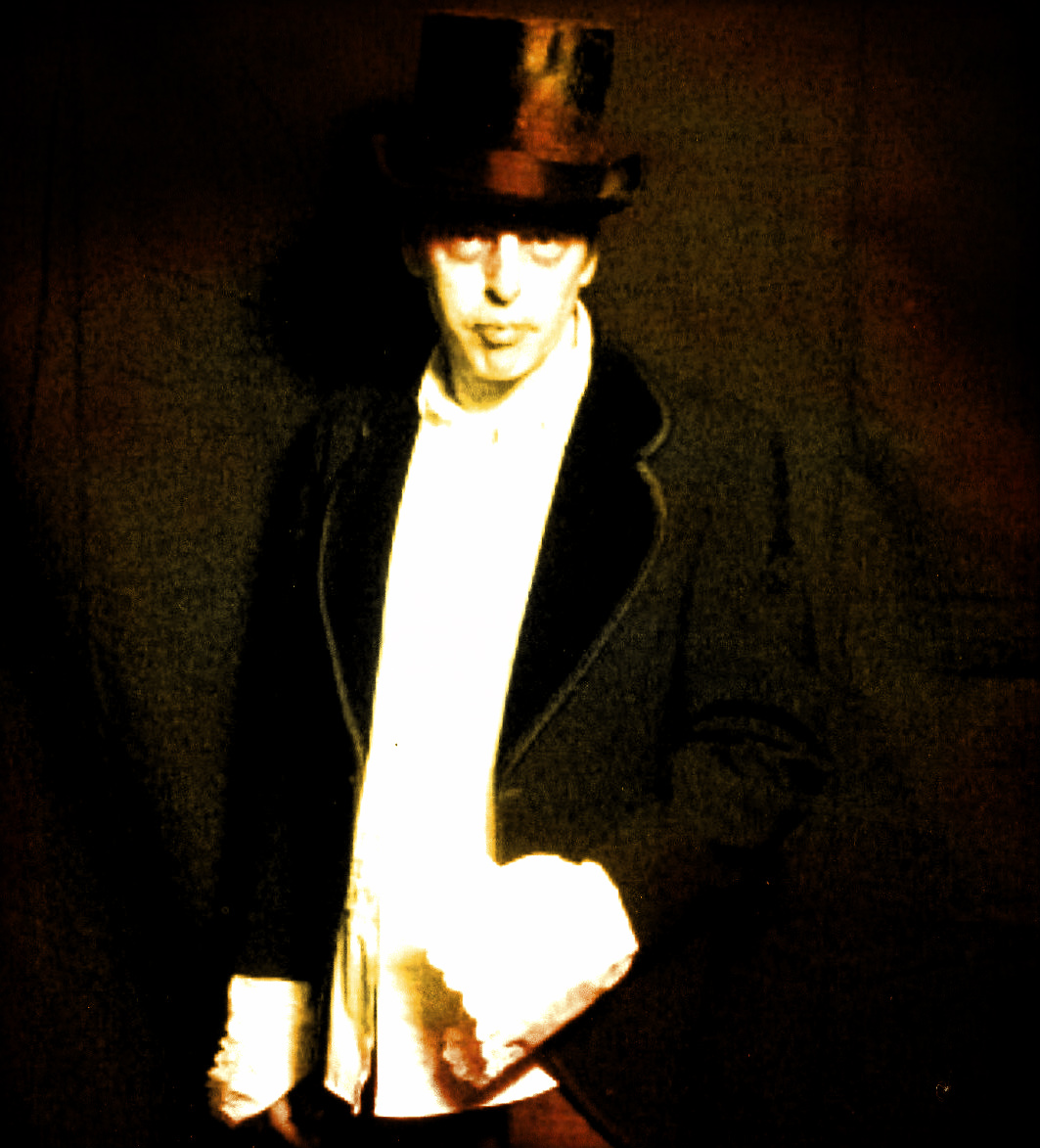
- David Sale 2012

Background information
- Also known as: Camus
- Genres: Rock, classical
- Occupations: Musician, songwriter, composer
- Instruments: Voice, piano, fiddle, guitar,
- Years active: 1996–present
- Labels: Atlantic, Koch, Warner
- Website: dksale.net

David Sale is an American singer-songwriter and investigator. He achieved notability back in the 90's as Camus with "sins of the Father", a release on Atlantic Records. The album includes the song Ouch which was featured on the Baywatch episode "Out of the Blue" alongside Cyndi Lauper. In this project he had the opportunity to collaborate with producers David Kahne and Kevin Killin.

== History ==
Previous to the Camus project, Sale was active in New Orleans operating the successful Street Records, an indie label featuring local and regional new indigenous music from 1992 to 1997. He also produced, engineered or consulted on projects for diverse musicians such as Rowland Howard, Willy Deville, Winton, Branford Marsalis and BeauSoleil.

Sale wrote and produced former Squirrel Nut Zippers vocalist Katharine Whalen's 2007 release Dirty Little Secret on Koch Records. Dirty Little Secret was also cited by No Depression Magazine as a "Genre Busting Beauty". Appearing on World café.

Sale co-directed the documentary On the Bus with Barnaby Greenburg, as well as several music videos for major labels. He has created and directed commercials. He co-wrote the film Dark Star with d'Philip Chalmers (in pre-production). Sale's music work was cited as "dazzling and seductive" by NPR's David Dye.

== Investigations ==
After releasing "Sins of the Father" on Atlantic Records under the name Camus, and co-writing and producing other projects, Sale started investigating wrongful convictions. The transition landed him on the front page of the St. Louis Post-Dispatch, when he got involved in the case of Mark Woodworth, who was framed for murder.

Similarly in Tennessee, he was involved in the case of Adam Braseel, who was framed for murder back in 2007 but exonerated by Governor Bill Lee. Sale set up auditions for a horror movie in Grundy County in order to meet people and discuss the case. Sale then got a call from similar murder convict Wayne Grimes from prison and has been working to free him and others.
