= Pierre Duval Le Camus =

French painter

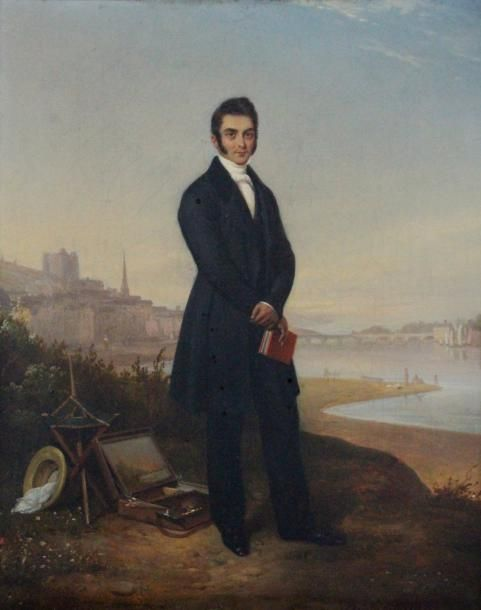
Presumed self-portrait by Pierre Duval Le Camus in front of the town of Saumur

Pierre Duval Le Camus, known as Camus le père (13 February 1790, Lisieux - 29 July 1854, Saint-Cloud) was a French painter and lithographer who specialized in portraits and genre scenes. His son, Jules-Alexandre Duval Le Camus, also became a well-known artist.

== Biography ==
His father, master glazier, sent him to Paris to learn the trade. Once there, he found himself attracted to the arts instead and began taking lessons from Claude Gautherot. Later, in 1808, he would study with Jacques-Louis David. In 1811, he painted a portrait of Eustache-Marie Courtin, the Procureur de la République.

As a result, he met and married Courtin's niece, Aglaé Virginie d'Houlouve; a fortunate marriage that opened the doors of high society to him, as her grandfather had been President of the Bar Association of the Parlement of Paris and her father was a cavalry officer.

In addition to his numerous portraits, of both the notable and the now-forgotten, he was also much appreciated for his genre scenes. He exhibited regularly at the Salon from 1819 to 1853. Many among the royalty were customers of his; La Réprimande was purchased by the Duchess de Berry, La Chasse au traque by Louis XVIII, and La Nourrice by King Louis-Philippe. He later became a sort of unofficial court painter for the Duchess.

In 1837, he founded the Musée d'art et d'histoire de Lisieux and was named a Chevalier in the Legion of Honor. In 1848, during the Revolution, he went to live in Saint-Cloud and served as Mayor from 1853 until his death.

His works may be seen at the Musée des Beaux-Arts de Bordeaux, Musée Thomas-Henry, Musée d'Art et d'Histoire de Narbonne, the Louvre and the Hermitage.

== Gallery ==
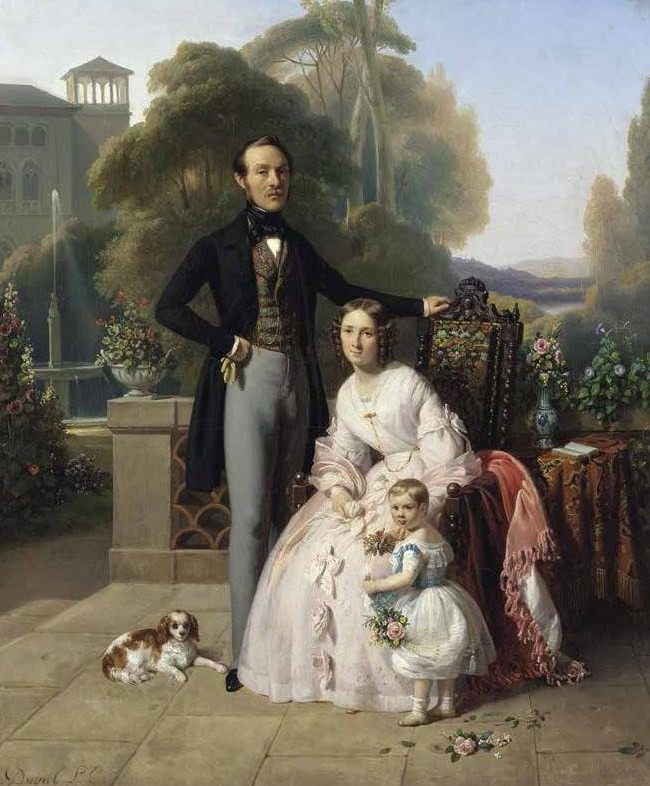
Ivan Mikhailovich Skoropadsky and his family

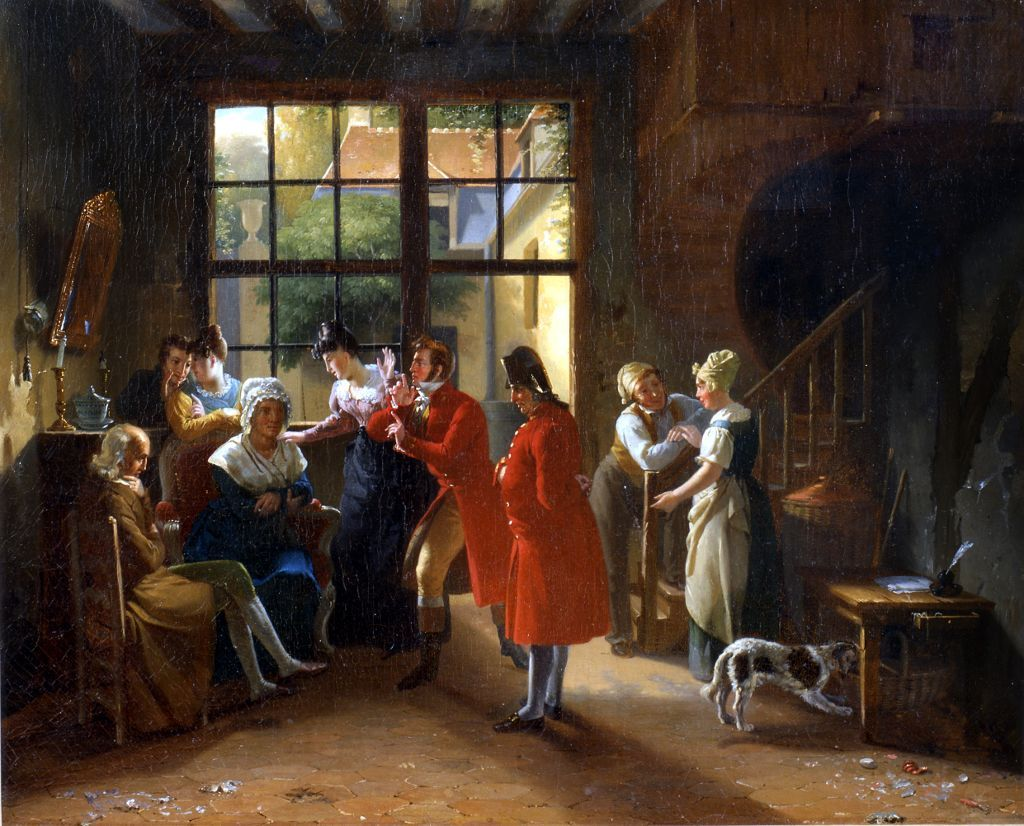
Gossipers at the Door
