= Giulio Camus =

French scientist (1847–1917)

Giulio Camus, also Jules (1 June 1847 in Magny-en-Vexin – 25 January 1917 in Turin) was a French botanist and entomologist.

Giulio Camus was a professor at the University of Turin. He wrote L'opera salernitana "Circa Instans" ed il testo primitivo del Grant Herbier en français – secondo due codici del sec. XV conservati nella Regia Biblioteca Estense in Memorie della Regia Accademia di Scienze Lettere ed Arti di Modena, IV (1886) and Les noms des plantes du Livre d’Heures d’Anne de Bretagne J. Bot. 8:325–335, 345–352, 366–375, 396–401 (1894).
