= Starting fluid =

Flammable substances added to aid engine combustion

Starting fluid is a volatile, flammable liquid which is used to aid the starting of internal combustion engines, especially during cold weather or in engines that are difficult to start using conventional starting procedures. It is typically available in an aerosol spray can, and may sometimes be used for starting direct injected diesel engines or lean burn spark engines running on alcohol fuel. Some modern starting fluid products contain mostly volatile hydrocarbons such as heptane (the main component of natural gasoline), with a small portion of diethyl ether, and carbon dioxide (as a propellant). Some formulations contain butane or propane as both propellant and starting fuel. Historically, diethyl ether, with a small amount of oil, a trace amount of a stabilizer and a hydrocarbon propellant has been used to help start internal combustion engines because of its low 160 °C (320 °F) autoignition temperature.

Diethyl ether is distinct from petroleum ether (a crude oil distillate consisting mostly of pentane and other alkanes) which has also been used for starting engines.

== Usage ==
=== Four stroke engines ===
Starting fluid is sprayed into the engine intake near the air filter, or into the carburetor bore or a spark plug hole of an engine to get added fuel to the combustion cylinder quickly. Using starting fluid to get the engine running faster avoids wear to starters and fatigue to one's arm with pull start engines, especially on rarely used machines. Other uses include cold weather starting, vehicles that run out of fuel and thus require extra time to restore fuel pressure, and sometimes with flooded engines. Mechanics sometimes use it to diagnose starting problems by determining whether the spark and ignition system of the vehicle is functioning; if the spark is adequate but the fuel delivery system is not, the engine will run until the starting fluid vapors are consumed. It is used more often with carbureted engines than with fuel injection systems. Caution is required when using starting fluid with diesel engines that have preheat systems in the intake or glow-plugs installed, as the starting fluid may pre-ignite, leading to engine damage.

=== Two stroke engines ===
Starting fluid is not recommended for regular use with some two-stroke engines because it does not possess lubricating qualities by itself. Lubrication for two-stroke engines is achieved using oil that is either mixed into the fuel by the user or injected automatically into the fuel supply; engines requiring premixed fuel that are run solely on starting fluid do not receive an adequate supply of lubrication to their crankcase and cylinder(s). Engines that haven't been run recently are especially vulnerable to damage from oil starvation; starting fluid, a strong solvent, tends to strip residual oil off of cranks and cylinder walls, further reducing lubrication during the period of fuel starvation. WD-40 was previously recommended for use on two stroke engines because it has lubricating qualities, but the formulation with non-flammable CO_{2} as propellant instead of propane no longer has the same combustible nature, making it useless as starting fluid on any type of engine.

=== Abuse ===
Diethyl ether has a long history as a medical anesthetic; when starting fluid was mostly ether, a similar effect could be obtained using it. Use at the present time directly as an inhalant includes the effect of the petroleum solvents, which are more toxic as inhalants than diethyl ether.

Sometimes referred to as "passing the shirt," the starting fluid is sprayed on a piece of cloth and held up to one's face for inhalation. This trend has gradually picked up since the turn of the century, as phrases such as "etherized" and "ethervision" have gained popularity. The effects of inhalation vary, but have been known to include lightheadedness, loss of coordination, paranoia, and sometimes hallucinations.
