= Jules-Alexandre Duval Le Camus =

French painter

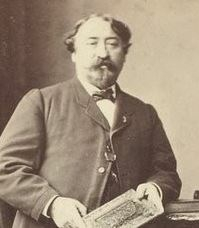
Jules-Alexandre Duval Le Camus (date unknown)

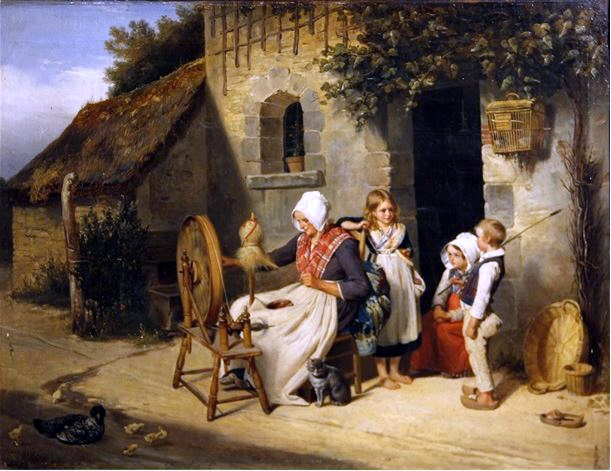
Spinning Wool

Jules-Alexandre Duval Le Camus (5 August 1814, Paris - 23 June 1878, Saint-Cloud) was a French painter who specialized in portraits and genre scenes.

== Biography ==
He was the only son of the painter Pierre Duval Le Camus. After receiving his initial lessons from his father, he was admitted to the studios of Paul Delaroche and Martin Drolling at the École des beaux-arts de Paris. He was awarded second place at the Prix de Rome of 1838.

Although his style is almost indistinguishable from his father's, he preferred to paint on smaller canvases. In addition to his best-known scenes from daily life, he did some occasional depictions of Biblical and mythological subjects. A notable example of this may be seen at the choir of the Église Saint-Clodoald de Saint-Cloud (1868-1876), which was a commission from the French government.
