= Mark Woodworth =

American convicted man

Mark Woodworth is an American man from Livingston County, Missouri, who was convicted twice for a 1990 home invasion murder of his family's farming partners, the Robertsons., which occurred when he was 16 years old. Woodworth spent twenty years in prison for the crime he did not do, but was finally freed and exonerated, after the ballistic evidence used against him was ruled to be tainted and was barred from being used in a court of law. The court also barred the Missouri Attorney General's office from prosecuting Woodworth a third time. When a special prosecutor was assigned who dropped all charges. Woodworth is listed in the National Registry of Exonerations.

His case was featured in episode: "Severed Ties - On the Case with Paula Zahn". As well as dozens of news articles following an alternate suspect, letters withheld from defense, and the strange twist of evidence removed in a surgery that was given to a private investigator who took it to England.

== Small-town murder ==
On the night of November 13, 1990, just some minutes before midnight, an assailant entered the Robertson home, located six miles outside of Chillicothe, Missouri. 44-year-old Lyndel Robertson was in bed with his 41-year-old wife Catherine, when the intruder opened fire with a.22 caliber gun. Catherine was shot in the back and in the head and died instantly. While Lyndel was shot several times, he survived. Of the four children in the house, none said they heard the gunfire. The youngest said he was awoken by his father moaning, and, after finding his father bleeding from his wounds, he ran to his sister's room, who called an ambulance.

Paramedics called to the scene found Catherine in bed. Lyndel was lying on the floor on the other side of the bed, and when approached he spit out a bullet fragment; they found another bullet fragment on the bed. A third fragment was removed from Lyndel's tongue at the hospital. After X Rays were performed, a bullet fragment was found lodged near Robertson's liver, which the doctors left in. Police found no signs the house had been robbed or that anyone heard their dog Goldie bark.

Three hours after the incident, a deputy went across the street to the home of Claude Woodworth. The Woodworth and Robertson families had been partnered in a large-scale farming operation for years. Claude told the deputy that both he and Lyndel had identical.22 caliber Ruger pistols. Lyndel kept his Ruger in his pickup truck in his machine shed. Claude went and got his Ruger from his bedroom. The deputy examined the gun and returned it.

Mark Woodworth, who was sixteen years old at the time, said he had used his father's pistol for target practice. He said that everyone who worked at the farm was aware Lyndel's gun was in his truck. They used it for target practice and had done so a few weeks before the shooting. Lyndel kept bullets for the gun in his truck, and he kept boxes of shells in the tractor shed where his truck was parked.

David Miller of the Chillicothe police said he found three boxes of.22 caliber shells on top of the workbench. In one box containing high-velocity.22 caliber long rifles, many of the bullets were missing. Miller dusted the box for fingerprints, and a thumbprint was found on the box with missing bullets.

At the hospital, Lyndel told his friends and Deputy Calvert that their attacker was a former boyfriend of his daughter.

== Investigation by Deister and the surgery bullet ==
After twenty months went by, Lyndel Robertson hired former Platte County deputy Terry Deister to work on the case. Deister had worked to convict Mark Sager in the Julie Whittmeyer case.

Diester acquired the aid of Chief Deputy Gary Calvert of the Livingston County Sheriff's Office. Calvert had recently been the lead officer in the Faye and Ray Copeland case.

On July 4, 1992, Claude and Jackie Woodworth and the family went to visit relatives back in Illinois. Mark stayed at the house alone. Diester and Deputy Calvert picked this time to go talk with Mark. They went to the Woodworths where Mark was finishing lunch and then took Mark to the Sheriff's Office, where he was questioned for over four hours. They took his fingerprints.

Running his prints, they found a match to one of the boxes of bullets found sitting on the work bench in the Roberton's machine shed the morning after the murder.

On July 4, 1992, Calvert returned to the Woodworth home with a warrant for Claude's.22 caliber Ruger.

Deister and Calvert arranged for Robertson to undergo surgery and remove a bullet lodged near his liver.

Deister then contacted Roger Summers in England, who had arranged the bite mark forensics in the Whittmeyer case. Summer connected him with Steve Nicklin in their ballistics unit.

Deister took the bullet fragment and the Woodworth gun to England and gave it to forensics expert Steve Nickilin. Nicklin's eventual conclusion was the bullet had marks that “strongly suggested” the bullet came from the Woodworth gun. The bullets recovered from the victims showed they had the same coating and similar marks as the bullets found in the machine shed.

On April 11, 1993, Mark was questioned again by Calvert and Deister. Again he said he didn't do it. He said he had been in the machine shed in the past as part of his work on the farm, but never touched any boxes of bullets on the bench. He later said it was possible he picked up a box of shells when he was in the shed helping Lyndel, but forgot he had done so.

Deister made his report that the bullet from Robertson's surgery came from the Woodworth gun and the print on the box of Bullets was Mark's. Adding that Mark had changed his story about touching any boxes. Robertson took Deister's report to Livingston County prosecutor Doug Roberts, demanding he charge Woodworth with the crime. District attorney Roberts refused.

After two months, Lyndel sent a letter to Livingston County Chief Justice Judge Kenneth Lewis asking him to push aside the elected DA and convene a grand jury. Lewis complied and appointed the Missouri Attorney General's Office to take over the prosecution.

== Grand jury ==
In Grand Jury transcripts found by Kelley Berkel, it was revealed that AG Jay Nixon and special prosecutor Kennth Hulshof were found to have made personal appearances at the October 1993 Grand jury to indict Mark Woodworth.

== Arrested ==
On October 29, 1993, Woodworth was charged with the second-degree murder of Catherine Robertson, and first-degree assault of Lyndel, burglary and armed criminal action.

Upon his arrest, his father hired attorney James Wyrch and Richard Gene McFadin. A well known Missouri lawyer featured in the Best selling "In Broad Daylight." The story of Ken Rex McElroy who was indicted 21 times, but with the aid of his lawyer McFaddin, got off each time.

Mark was sent to a polygraph examination with consent of McFaddin, though not present, he left Mark on his own. The examiner told Mark he failed, and when threatened with the eclectic chair, Mark replied: “Well, we all have to die someday.”

== First Trial ==
In March 1995. Woodworth was tried as an adult in McFaddin and James Wyrsch handled his defense.

The prosecution contended that Mark took his father's gun and walked across the road and shot the Robertsons, stopping by the work bench in the Robertson's machine shed to get bullets. They flew Steve Nicklin from England, who testified about the bullet fragment taken from Robertson's surgery, who testified his results “strongly suggest” the bullet came from the Woodworth gun.

Officer Miller testified that he found a box of bullets on the workbench in Robertson's machine shed and dusted them for prints.

Don Locke testified that the thumbprint on the box of bullets matched Mark Woodworth's prints.

Deputy Calvert testified that Woodworth gave conflicting statements about how many times he had been in the shed and how often he went target shooting with his father's pistol.

Before the shooting, Mark had harvested 100 acres of his own soybean crop the parents allowed him to plant. Worth about $6,000. Prosecutor Hulshof presented a theory that Mark felt cheated because the Robertsons disputed the amount he was owed after expenses. Although he presented no evidence, the Robertsons had never said anything about this to the Woodworths.

Woodworth testified on his own behalf and denied the crime. He said that he and others on the farm had used Lyndel's gun for target shooting and the box of shells with his thumbprint may have been in Lyndel's truck at one point. Another witness, Neal Williams, also testified that he, Woodworth, and others used Lyndel's gun and ammunition for target shooting. Williams testified that this ammunition was sometimes moved from the truck to the shed or from the shed to the truck.

The defense attempted to put on evidence about Rochelle Robertson's former boyfriend Thomure and his possible motive for injuring the Robertsons, the prosecution objected and most of it was ruled inadmissible. The judge ruled that an alternate suspect can only be admitted when there is direct evidence tying the suspect to the crime. Ruling the gunpowder residue found on Thomure was not sufficient. The judge also ruled that Lyndel's statements at the hospital identifying Thomure as his assailant were not direct evidence since Lyndel had denied making such statements.

In March 1995, a Livingston County jury convicted Woodworth of all charges. Mark Woodworth was sentenced to 31 years in prison.

A conviction that divided the town of Chillicothe.

== Reversal ==
Two years later the Missouri Court of Appeals ruled that the trial judge erred, and the jury should have heard evidence that Lyndel Robertson had identified Thomure as the shooter while in the hospital, as well as evidence of Thomure's possible motive and opportunity.

== Second Trial ==
In November 1999, the State tried Woodworth a second time, and once again convicted Woodworth of the Robertson shooting. His sentence was added to, and he was given life in prison, plus an additional fifteen years.

== New investigation ==
2010. Associated Press reporter Alan Scher Zagier discovered three letters involving prosecutor Keneth Hulshof, Judge Lewis and Lyndel Robertson. A September 24 Letter from Robertson to Lewis asking him to push aside County Prosecutor Doug Roberts. One letter from County Prosecutor Doug Roberts where he stated Robertson was at first adamant that another be charged with the crime. In another letter, Lyndel said that justice would not be served until evidence against Mark was brought to a grand jury.

St. Louis attorney Robert Ramsey took up the case and uncovered police reports showing that after the shooting, Rochelle had reported that Thomure had violated a protection order barring him from contacting her.

Ramsey citing the letters as undisclosed violations of Due Process, filed a writ of habeas corpus in July 2010 on Mark's behalf to the Missouri Supreme Court, who then appointed a special master, Judge Oxenhandler, to hold evidentiary hearings. Ramsey put on many witnesses, and in May 2012, the special master found violations of Brady when the prosecution did not disclose the letters and police reports to his defense lawyers. Recommending that Woodworth was entitled to a new trial. Oxenhandler's report would now go to the Missouri Supreme Court for a decision, though the Attorney General's office was prepared to put up a fight.

Ramsey by then had found a witness who said they had told police that Thomure was in Chillicothe early in the morning after the shooting—which contradicted Thomure's alibi claim that he was hours away.

When consulting with Innocence Project attorney Sean O’Brian, Ramsey was told the state would not only fight him in the court but in the media. At which point he consulted with David Sale, who had experience in publicity, and suggested they work towards a documentary and an online presence as a way to bring attention to the case.

Gaining access to the case file and building a web presence with Road To Chillicothe, and other web platforms, Sale began outlining the case and gaining followers. Putting an emphasis on the obvious and bizarre lack of chain of custody of the bullet evidence. Critical evidence that was just handed to a private eye who judge Oxenhandler had deemed not credible.

A bullet removed in a surgery, just given to Robertson's unlicensed PI, Terry Deister along with the Woodworth gun he was trying to match it to; evidence Deister then flew to England and gave to a forensics person he arranged. Sale asked the question to the public, if there was no chain of custody of the original bullet from the surgery, what guarantee was there that someone in the chain had not made a new bullet from the woodworth gun?

Todd Frankel of the St. Louis Post wrote: “Early on, he pushed a theory that the bullet tied by ballistic tests to a handgun owned by the Woodworth family also had been planted — or at least swapped out. Then, last year, a judge barred this same ballistic evidence from a third trial, finding “egregious, flagrant, cavalier disregard for evidentiary procedures and processes. The court didn’t go nearly as far as Sale in calling it faked. But, in many eyes, it was close enough. The evidence was tossed, and an appellate court agreed with the call."

Though eventually an expert would testify that the bullet that came back from England was not the same in his eyes as one described by the doctor when it was removed.

Sale also questioned why the officers had not photographed the box of bullets on the bench when they found it, or why there was no report from Miller of dusting the box. A video was shot the morning after the murder of the entire crime scene, including the machine shed and the bench, but showed no boxes on the workbench. With Kelley Berkel of Ramsey's office, they obtained a photo used at the first trial, where the saw that officer Miller had drawn a box on a still photo taken from the video of the workbench. Drawn it on with a felt tip pen. At the hearing before the master, a Linn County sheriff's deputy testified that Deputy Paul Frey told him that he, not Deputy Miller, had lifted the fingerprints from the box of bullets. This testimony only added more questions about the fingerprint that was said to be found on the box of bullets that matched Mark's.

== Mark Woodworth's conviction overturned again ==
On January 5, 2013, after attorney Robert Ramsey gave oral arguments in front of The Missouri Supreme Court, Mark Woodworth's conviction was overturned for a second time.

== 2013 evidence barred ==
The Missouri attorney general's office was threatening to take Mark Woodrworth back to trial a third time, threatening to bus in jurors after complaining the jury pool had been tainted by online efforts. Where Sale was asked to write out an affidavit that attested that Livingston County prosecutor Adam Warren had not been part of his web group.

Robert Ramsey filed a motion to Platte County Circuit Judge Owens Lee Hull Jr that the bullet evidence in the case be thrown out. Forensics consultant Daniel Jackson testified that “the bullet looked different in a crime scene photo than how it was described by the doctor who removed it from Lyndel Robertson's liver.” Jackson also pointed out a four-day gap in the handling of the bullet - calling to question the chain of custody.

If the AG's prosecutors were going to try Mark again, they would have to do it without the evidence.

On April 15 Circuit Judge Hull found what he called an “egregious, flagrant, cavalier disregard for evidentiary procedures and processes” in the case against Mark Woodworth. Barring the state from using the critical handgun and bullet evidence.

== Missouri attorney general’s office is barred from trying the case ==
On January 29, 2014, Platte County Circuit Judge Owens Lee Hull Jr. barred the Missouri attorney general's office from trying the case at all. “Hull said previous prosecutorial missteps that contributed to Woodworth’s first two convictions required an independent review of this case by a prosecutor unburdened by past participation.” Bill Draper Associated Press

Judge Hull gave the case to Livingston County prosecutor Adam Warren, who then asked to be removed from the case after Robertson family members questioned his ability to be impartial.

== February 2014 – all charges dropped ==
Special prosecutor Don Norris was appointed and dropped all charges against Mark Woodworth.
