= Philippe Camus (writer) =

French writer

- Occupation: writer

Philippe Camus was a 15th-century French writer who wrote L'Histoire d'Olivier de Castille et Artus d'Algarbe (between 1430 and 1460) as well as a prose version of Adenet le Roi's romance Cleomadés.
