= Droz =

Droz is a surname:

- Charles C. Droz (1924–2025), American politician
- Daniela Droz (born 1977), Puerto Rican actress, singer, and television host in Spanish-language media
- Evelio Droz (1937–2025), Puerto Rican basketball player
- Joseph Droz (1773–1850), French writer on ethics, political science, and political economy
- Laura Droz (born 2000), Swiss footballer
- Numa Droz (1844–1899), Swiss politician
- Pierre Jaquet-Droz (1721–1790), Swiss-born watchmaker of the late eighteenth century, also working in Paris and London
  - Jaquet-Droz automata, the doll automata co-built by Jaquet-Droz
- Antoine Gustave Droz (1832–1895), French man of letters, son of the French sculptor Jules-Antoine Droz (1807–1872)
- Jules Humbert-Droz (1891–1971), Swiss pastor, journalist, Socialist and Communist
- Eugénie Droz (1893–1976), Swiss literary scholar and publisher
- Droz (wrestler) (1969–2023), American World Wrestling Federation wrestler and NFL player

== See also ==
- Mehmet Oz (born 1960), American television presenter, physician, author, educator, and government official known as Dr. Oz
