= The Invention of Hugo Cabret =

2007 children's novel by Brian Selznick

- Author: Brian Selznick
- Cover artist: Brian Selznick
- Language: English
- Genre: Historical fiction, children's literature
- Published: January 30, 2007 (Scholastic Press, an Imprint of Scholastic Inc.)
- Publication place: United States
- Media type: Hardcover
- Pages: 526
- Awards: Caldecott Medal (2008)
- ISBN: 978-0-439-81378-5
- OCLC: 67383288
- LC Class: PZ7.S4654 Inv 2007

The Invention of Hugo Cabret is a children's historical fiction book written and illustrated by Brian Selznick and published by Scholastic. The hardcover edition was released on January 30, 2007 and the paperback edition was released on June 2, 2008. With 284 pictures between the book's 533 pages, the book depends as much on its pictures as it does on the words. Selznick himself has described the book as "not exactly a novel, not quite a picture book, not really a graphic novel, or a flip book or a movie, but a combination of all these things".

The book received positive reviews, with praise for its illustrations and plot. It won the 2008 Caldecott Medal, the first novel to do so, as the Caldecott Medal is for picture books, and was adapted by Martin Scorsese as the 2011 film Hugo.

== Plot ==
=== The Hidden Clock Keeper ===
In 1930s Paris, young Hugo Cabret and his father repair an automaton at the museum where his father works. When Hugo's father dies in a fire, his uncle brings him to live and work at the train station maintaining the clocks. His uncle disappears, and Hugo keeps the clocks running by himself, living inside the station walls and stealing food from the shops. One day, he rescues the automaton from the burnt museum in hopes of restoring it. Later, he discovers a keyhole in the shape of a heart, and works on finding the key.

=== Part I ===
A few months later, Hugo is caught stealing from a toy booth and is forced to return his stolen tools and mechanisms, as well as his notebook containing his father's drawings of the automaton. Hugo follows the shopkeeper to his house but fails to retrieve his notebook. A girl in the house named Isabelle promises him she will make sure the notebook is not destroyed.

The next day, Hugo returns to the toy booth, where the shopkeeper tells him the notebook has been burnt; he encounters Isabelle, who assures him it is safe. Isabelle brings him to a bookshop to meet her friend Etienne, who sneaks them into the cinema; Papa Georges, the shopkeeper, has forbidden Isabelle from watching films.

Papa Georges forces Hugo to work at the toy booth, with the possibility of returning the Diary; the job further delays Hugo's clock duties. Hugo and Isabelle visit the theater but learn Etienne has been fired for sneaking children in, so Isabelle unlocks the door with a bobby pin. They are kicked out, and Hugo is almost caught by the station inspector. Isabelle asks Hugo about his life, but he runs away, fearing that sharing the truth will send him to an orphanage or prison. Isabelle chases him but trips, revealing a heart-shaped key around her neck, which Hugo realizes is the key to the automaton.

The next morning, Hugo learns that Isabelle has read his diary. He pickpockets the key with a technique learned from a book on magic and returns to his hidden room, where he is confronted by Isabelle. They use the key to activate the auto-machine, which produces a drawing of a rocket which has landed in one of the eyes of the "man in the Moon."

=== Part II ===
The automaton signs its drawing “Georges Méliès”, who Isabelle reveals is Papa Georges. Believing Hugo has stolen the automaton, she runs home; Hugo follows, and inadvertently crushes his hand in the front door, and she brings him inside. Hugo notices a strangely locked drawer; Isabelle picks it open but drops the heavy box inside, breaking it, and sprains her foot. Georges enters and is enraged, ripping up the drawings inside the box. After Mama Jeanne forces everyone to bed, Hugo takes the key to the toy booth back to the station.

The next day, he and Isabelle collect the money from the booth and buy medicine for Georges. Hugo visits the film academy library where Etienne now works. Hugo finds a book titled The Invention of Dreams with a drawing of the automaton, which he learns is a scene from the first movie his father ever saw, A Trip to the Moon, directed by Georges Méliès. Hugo invites Etienne and the book's author, René Tabard, to Isabelle's house later, and explains Méliès’ career to Isabelle.

At the house, Tabard and Etienne screen A Trip to the Moon, and Georges finally reveals his past: he was the prolific and innovative filmmaker Méliès, but after World War I, the deaths of Isabelle's parents, and the loss of most of his films in a fire, he sank into depression and burned the rest, to begin a new life at the toy booth. He also created the automaton; excited to learn it has survived, he asks Hugo to bring it to him. Hugo returns to the station, stealing breakfast from Monsieur Frick and Miss Emily as usual; overhearing that his uncle was found dead, Hugo drops the milk bottle and is discovered. He escapes and fetches the automaton, but is pursued by the station inspector. In the chase, Hugo is almost struck by a train but is pulled back by the inspector, and faints.

Hugo awakens in a cell. He reveals everything to the inspector and is released to be adopted by Georges, Mama Jean, and Isabelle. He and Méliès repair the automaton together.

=== Epilogue: 6 months later ===
Six months later, Hugo and his new family attend a grand concert including Méliès’ surviving film scenes. Onstage, Tabard acknowledges Hugo, Isabelle, and Etienne for their help in honoring Georges. In the end, it is revealed that Hugo Cabret made his own automaton that wrote and drew the entire book of The Invention of Hugo Cabret.

== Main characters ==
- Hugo Cabret – The main protagonist of the story. He is only 12, and has a great talent for working with mechanical contraptions, especially clockworks. It is mentioned in the book that he could fix almost everything. After moving to the train station after his father died, he became used to stealing food and drinks and other objects from people to survive in the walls train station, even if reluctantly. He is smart, determined, but is occasionally rude due to not having anyone for 2 years of living in the station until meeting Isabelle. He is described to have dirty and tousled hair. He cares deeply about his friends and family, especially his father, who has died.
- Isabelle – The second main character in the book. After her parents died in a car crash, her godfather, Georges Méliès and godmother, Jeanne Méliès adopted her. Due to the risk of Isabelle knowing that he was a movie maker until he was sent into depression and began working at the toy booth, Méliès forbids her from going to the cinema. However, she is still able to watch movies since her friend, Etienne often helps sneak her in, but doesn't know who her uncle actually is, until meeting Hugo. She is described as having large black eyes, and to be slightly taller than Hugo.
- Georges Méliès – Georges's parents worked on making shoes and encouraged him to do the same, yet he disliked it. When he grew into a young man and the movies were invented, he asked the Lumiere brothers, one of the first directors, to sell him a camera, they refused so Méliès made his own camera out of his remaining materials from his parents' shoe company. His most famous work, A Trip to the Moon, was the first sci-fi movie ever made. He was also the director who first began using special effects in movies. Selznick made his personality to be often cold and haughty. In the drawings it is shown that by this point in the book he is in his senior years, and at the beginning of the book he is called 'the old man'.
- Hugo's father – Hugo's father worked at a museum in Paris when he found the automaton. When there was a fire in the museum, he dies. Hugo is still able to continue his father's work of fixing it with his notebook. There is no mention of a mother at all, and since Hugo left with his uncle to the station, it is assumed that his mother may have died.
  Maillardet's automaton at the Franklin Institute
- Georges Méliès' automaton – One of Selznick's inspirations to incorporate an automaton into the story was the book titled Edison’s Eve: A Magical Quest for Mechanical Life by Gaby Wood, which includes a chapter on Georges Méliès' collection of automata. His automata were kept in a museum in Paris but were later thrown away. Selznick's original idea was to have Hugo find an automaton in a pile of garbage and fix it. At that time, Selznick began his research on automata and the curator at the Franklin Institute allowed him to study their automaton. The history of the automaton at the institute also had a mysterious origin that was similar to what Selznick had in mind. The automaton donated to the Institute suffered major damage from a fire. It was believed at the time of donation that it was made by a French inventor named Maelzel. However, after a member of staff fixed it and got it to work, the automaton wrote at the end of a poem in French: "Ecrit par L'Automate de Maillardet"—translated as "Written by the automaton of Maillardet", revealing its true maker to be Henri Maillardet. After many different ideas, Selznick settled on the story that Hugo's father had a connection with the automaton and died before the automaton was found in a burned-out building. The automaton illustrated in the book has many elements that resemble the automaton at the institute.

== Secondary characters ==
- Uncle Claude – Hugo's uncle, who adopted and brought him to work on the clocks at the train station. He is also the reason that Hugo stopped attending school, but Hugo began school again after Georges Méliès adopted him. Claude made Hugo sleep on the floor and yelled at him angrily when he made a mistake with the clocks. He smoked a lot and was an alcoholic, and he was found dead at the bottom of a lake. He was the clock timekeeper at the Paris train station, a task undertaken by Hugo after Claude's death.
- Etienne – Isabelle's friend, who often sneaks her into the cinema due to her godparent's refusal. When he gives Hugo a coin to buy the book that he used for stealing Isabelle's key, he asks Hugo to guess what was behind his eye patch. Hugo guesses an eye, but Ettienne reveals that he lost his eye as a child when he was playing with fireworks. Hugo gives up on guessing, and so Etienne takes a coin from behind the eyepatch and gives it to him to buy the book. The drawings in the book depict a young man with smooth hair, a genuine smile and an eyepatch. He is polite, especially with children, but can also be mischievous, as shown when he is caught sneaking children into the cinema and when he was playing with fireworks. Etienne used to work at the cinema, but when he got fired he began working at the film academy library.
- René Tabard – He was the author of The Invention of Dreams and Etienne's master at the film academy. Like most characters in the book, he enjoys the movies. He is a huge, probably the biggest, fan of director Georges Méliès and was hired as assistant director and editor of his movies.
- Jeanne Méliès – Known to Isabelle as Mama Jeanne, the wife of Georges Méliès was trusted by him to keep the heart-shaped key that activated the automaton until it got stolen by her goddaughter Isabelle. She, in her defense, said that she just thought it was pretty. Like Georges, she is in her elder years.
- Madame Emile – A character who only appears twice in the book, the first time being when she finds out that Hugo was stealing croissants from her and Monsieur Frick, and the second time being when she is there when Hugo is in the fugitive cell, and believes that he is telling the truth to the station inspector.
- Station Inspector – Hugo has been avoiding this character ever since his uncle Claude disappeared. The first sign of irregularity that the station inspector notices is when the clocks begin to be early or late, even if only by seconds, because Hugo, having decided to work for Georges, doesn't have time to wind the clocks. The second is when he sends a letter to Claude, asking for an interview with him, but there comes no response. Finally, he decides to go see what is going on with the station clocks, only to have a long chase with Hugo Cabret. He is described as wearing a stylish blue uniform with a blue cap and smelling of vegetables. He is later revealed to also have been an orphan, and has a leg contraption to help him walk.

== Conception ==
The book's primary inspiration is the true story of turn-of-the-century French pioneer filmmaker Georges Méliès, his surviving films, and his collection of mechanical, wind-up figures called automata. Selznick decided to add an Automaton to the storyline after reading Gaby Wood's 2003 book Edison's Eve, which tells the story of Edison's attempt to create a talking wind-up doll. Méliès owned a set of automata, which were sold to a museum but lay forgotten in an attic for decades. Eventually, when someone re-discovered them, they had been ruined by rainwater. At the end of his life, Méliès was destitute, even as his films were screening widely in the United States. He sold toys from a booth in a Paris railway station, which provides the setting of the story. Selznick drew Méliès's real door in the book, as well as real columns and other details from the Montparnasse railway station in Paris, France.

== Reception ==
The book received generally positive reviews. Writing for The New York Times, John Schwartz praised the book as "wonderful", and the drawings as "amazing". In a starred review, Publishers Weekly called the book a "true masterpiece—an artful blending of narrative, illustration and cinematic technique". The Bulletin of the Center for Children's Books compared the book to "intricate and tension-filled silent movie", praising the plot's "satisfying layers" and "careful pacing". Roger Sutton of The Horn Book Magazine noted the book's "several excellent chase scenes", and called the interactions between text and illustrations "complete genius".

The book was awarded the 2008 Caldecott Medal, and was a National Book Award finalist. By 2011, it had sold "millions of copies" and by 2023, it had been translated into 13 languages.

== Film adaptation ==
A film adaptation, Hugo, was produced in 2011. Martin Scorsese bought the screen rights to the book in 2007, and John Logan wrote the script. Scorsese began shooting the film in London at Shepperton Studios in June 2010. It was produced in 3D, with its theatrical release on November 23, 2011, and distributed by Paramount Pictures. Asa Butterfield played the title role of Hugo Cabret, with Ben Kingsley as Georges Méliès, Chloë Grace Moretz as Isabelle and Sacha Baron Cohen as the station inspector. Jude Law, Richard Griffiths, Ray Winstone, Christopher Lee, Frances de la Tour and Helen McCrory were also featured. The film was a box office failure but received critical acclaim, scoring a 94% on Rotten Tomatoes, and 83 on Metacritic. In 2012, the film was nominated for 11 Academy Awards, including Best Picture, and ended up winning five (for Best Sound Editing, Best Sound Mixing, Best Art Direction, Best Cinematography and Best Visual Effects).

Awards
Preceded by Flotsam	Caldecott Medal recipient 2008	Succeeded by The House in the Night
