= Hugo (film) =

2011 American adventure drama film

- Theatrical release poster
- Directed by: Martin Scorsese
- Screenplay by: John Logan
- Based on: The Invention of Hugo Cabret by Brian Selznick
- Produced by: Graham King; Timothy Headington; Martin Scorsese; Johnny Depp
- Starring: Ben Kingsley; Sacha Baron Cohen; Asa Butterfield; Chloë Grace Moretz; Ray Winstone; Emily Mortimer; Jude Law
- Cinematography: Robert Richardson
- Edited by: Thelma Schoonmaker
- Music by: Howard Shore
- Production companies: Infinitum Nihil; GK Films
- Distributed by: Paramount Pictures
- Release dates: October 10, 2011 (NYFF); November 23, 2011 (United States)
- Running time: 126 minutes
- Country: United States
- Language: English
- Budget: $150–170 million
- Box office: $185.8 million

Hugo is a 2011 American adventure drama film directed and produced by Martin Scorsese, and adapted for the screen by John Logan. Based on Brian Selznick's 2007 book The Invention of Hugo Cabret, it tells the story of a boy who lives alone in the Gare Montparnasse railway station in Paris in the 1930s, only to become embroiled in a mystery surrounding his late father's automaton and the pioneering filmmaker Georges Méliès.

Hugo is Scorsese's first film shot in 3D, about which the filmmaker remarked, "I found 3D to be really interesting, because the actors were more upfront emotionally. Their slightest move, their slightest intention is picked up much more precisely." The film was released in the United States on November 23, 2011.

Despite receiving considerable acclaim from critics, Hugo was a box-office bomb, grossing only $185 million against its estimated $150 million budget. The film received 11 Academy Award nominations (including Best Picture), more than any other film that year, winning a leading five awards: Best Cinematography, Best Art Direction, Best Sound Mixing, Best Sound Editing, and Best Visual Effects. It was also nominated for eight BAFTAs, including Best Director, and winning two, and was nominated for three Golden Globes, including Scorsese's third win for Best Director.

== Plot ==
In 1931 Paris, 12-year-old Hugo Cabret lives with his widowed father, a clockmaker who works at a museum. Hugo's father finds a broken automaton – a mechanical man created to draw with a pen. He and Hugo try to repair it, documenting their work in a notebook. Following his father's death in a fire, Hugo goes to live with his alcoholic uncle, Claude, who maintains the clocks at Gare Montparnasse. When Claude goes missing, Hugo continues maintaining the clocks, fearing that the Station Inspector Gustave Dasté will send him away if Claude's absence is discovered. Hugo attempts to repair the automaton with stolen parts, believing it contains a message from his father, but the machine requires a heart-shaped key.

One day, Hugo is caught stealing parts from a toy store, and the owner, Georges, takes his notebook, threatening to destroy it. Georges' goddaughter Isabelle suggests that Hugo confront Georges and demand it back. Georges reluctantly proposes that Hugo work at his toy store as recompense, and might earn the notebook back in the future. Hugo accepts the job offer and commences work, in addition to his job maintaining the clocks. Isabelle and Hugo become fast friends, and Hugo is astonished to see she wears a heart-shaped key, given to her by Georges. Hugo shows her the automaton, which they activate with the key. It draws a scene from A Trip to the Moon, once described to Hugo by his father. Isabelle identifies the drawing's signature as that of "Georges Méliès" – her godfather. She sneaks Hugo into her home, where they find a hidden cache of drawings in an armoire, but they are discovered by a bewildered Georges, who bans Hugo from his house.

Several days later, at the Film Academy Library, Hugo and Isabelle find a book about the history of cinema that praises Méliès' contributions. They meet the book's author, René Tabard, a film expert who is surprised to hear Méliès is alive, as he disappeared after World War I along with the copies of his films. Excited at the chance to meet Méliès again, René agrees to meet Isabelle and Hugo at Georges' home tomorrow evening to show his copy of A Trip to the Moon.

Finding the heart-shaped key on the station railway tracks, Hugo drops down to the track to retrieve it, and is run over by an out-of-control train that smashes through the station. He wakes up from the nightmare, but hears an ominous ticking emanating from himself, and discovers he has been turned into the automaton. Hugo wakes up again; it was only another nightmare.

At Georges' home, his wife Jeanne allows them in after René recognizes her as Jeanne d'Alcy, an actress in many of Méliès' films. They play the film, waking Georges, who is finally convinced to cherish his accomplishments rather than regret his lost dreams. Georges recounts that, as a stage magician, he was fascinated by motion pictures and used film to create imaginative works through his Star Film Company. Forced into bankruptcy after the war, he closed his studio and disposed of his films. He laments that even an automaton he built and donated to a museum was lost in a fire; Hugo realizes it is the one he has repaired.

Hugo races to the station to retrieve the automaton but is caught by Dasté, who has learned of Claude's death. Dasté prepares to take him to the orphanage, but Hugo manages to escape and precariously hides on the outer face of the clock tower. After climbing back inside, Hugo races for the exit but drops the automaton on the tracks. He jumps down to retrieve it and is almost run over by a train, but Dasté saves him and the automaton at the last minute. Georges arrives at the scene and tells Dasté "This child belongs to me." while saving Hugo, who realized that the automaton survived. Hugo is then adopted by Georges.

Sometime later, Georges is named a professor at the Film Academy, and is paid tribute through a showcase of his films recovered by René. Hugo and his new family celebrate at the apartment, and Isabelle begins to write down Hugo's story.

== Cast ==
- Asa Butterfield as Hugo Cabret
- Ben Kingsley as Georges Méliès / Papa Georges
- Sacha Baron Cohen as Inspector Gustave Dasté (credited as Station Inspector)
- Chloë Grace Moretz as Isabelle
- Ray Winstone as Claude Cabret
- Emily Mortimer as Lisette
- Jude Law as Mr. Cabret
- Helen McCrory as Jehanne D'Alcy / Mama Jeanne
- Michael Stuhlbarg as René Tabard
  - Gulliver McGrath as Young Tabard
- Christopher Lee as Monsieur Labisse
- Frances de la Tour as Madame Emile
- Richard Griffiths as Monsieur Frick
- Kevin Eldon as Policeman
- Angus Barnett as Cinema manager
- Ben Addis as Salvador Dalí
- Emil Lager as Django Reinhardt
- Robert Gill as James Joyce
- Marco Aponte as Train engineer assistant

Michael Pitt, Martin Scorsese, and Brian Selznick have cameo roles.

== Production ==
=== Pre-production ===
GK Films acquired the screen rights to The Invention of Hugo Cabret shortly after the book was published in 2007. Initially, Chris Wedge was signed in to direct the adaptation and John Logan was contracted to write the screenplay. The film was initially titled Hugo Cabret. Several actors were hired, including Ben Kingsley, Sacha Baron Cohen, Asa Butterfield, Chloë Grace Moretz, and Helen McCrory. Jude Law, Ray Winstone, Christopher Lee, Frances de la Tour, and Richard Griffiths later joined the project. Hugo was originally budgeted at $100 million, but ran over with a final budget between $156 million and $170 million. In February 2012, Graham King summed up his experience of producing Hugo: "Let's just say that it hasn't been an easy few months for me—there's been a lot of Ambien involved".

=== Filming ===
Principal photography began in London on June 29, 2010; the first shooting location was at the Shepperton Studios. The Nene Valley Railway near Peterborough also lent their original Compagnie Internationale des Wagons-Lits rolling stock to the studio.

In August 2010, production moved to Paris for two weeks. Locations included the Sainte-Geneviève Library, the Sorbonne (where a lecture hall was converted into a 1930s cinema hall) in the 5th arrondissement, and the Théâtre de l'Athénée and its surrounding area in the 9th. High school Lycée Louis-le-Grand served as the film's base of operations in Paris; its cafeteria served 700 meals a day for the cast and crew. Chloë Grace Moretz adopted a British accent for her role as Isabelle, reflecting the longstanding convention of using British accents in European historical settings, even when the setting is not Britain. Moretz later stated that director Martin Scorsese initially believed she was British during her audition.

=== Music ===
The film's soundtrack includes an Oscar-nominated original score composed by Howard Shore, and also makes prominent use of the Danse macabre by Camille Saint-Saëns and Gnossienne No. 1 by Erik Satie. Additional music was provided uncredited by French pianist and composer Jean-Michel Bernard. The singer Zaz performs on track 20, "Cœur volant".

== Release ==
The film was originally intended to be distributed by Sony Pictures until February 2011, when Paramount Pictures acquired worldwide distribution rights for the film excluding the United Kingdom and Ireland, France, Italy, Switzerland, Turkey and the Middle East. GK Films retained rights to these territories, selling them to independent companies including Entertainment Film Distributors for the United Kingdom and Ireland, Metropolitan Filmexport for France, 01 Distribution for Italy, Ascot Elite Entertainment Group for Switzerland, Pinema for Turkey and Gulf Film for the Middle East.

The film premiered at the 2011 New York Film Festival on October 10, was theatrically released on November 23, 2011, by Paramount Pictures, and was released on DVD and Blu-ray on February 28, 2012, by Paramount Home Media Distribution. Hugo has grossed $34.3 million in home video revenue.

The film had its UK premiere at the Royal Film Performance, an event held in aid of the Film & TV Charity, on November 28, 2011, at the Odeon Leicester Square. It was attended by the Prince of Wales and The Duchess of Cornwall.

== Historical references ==
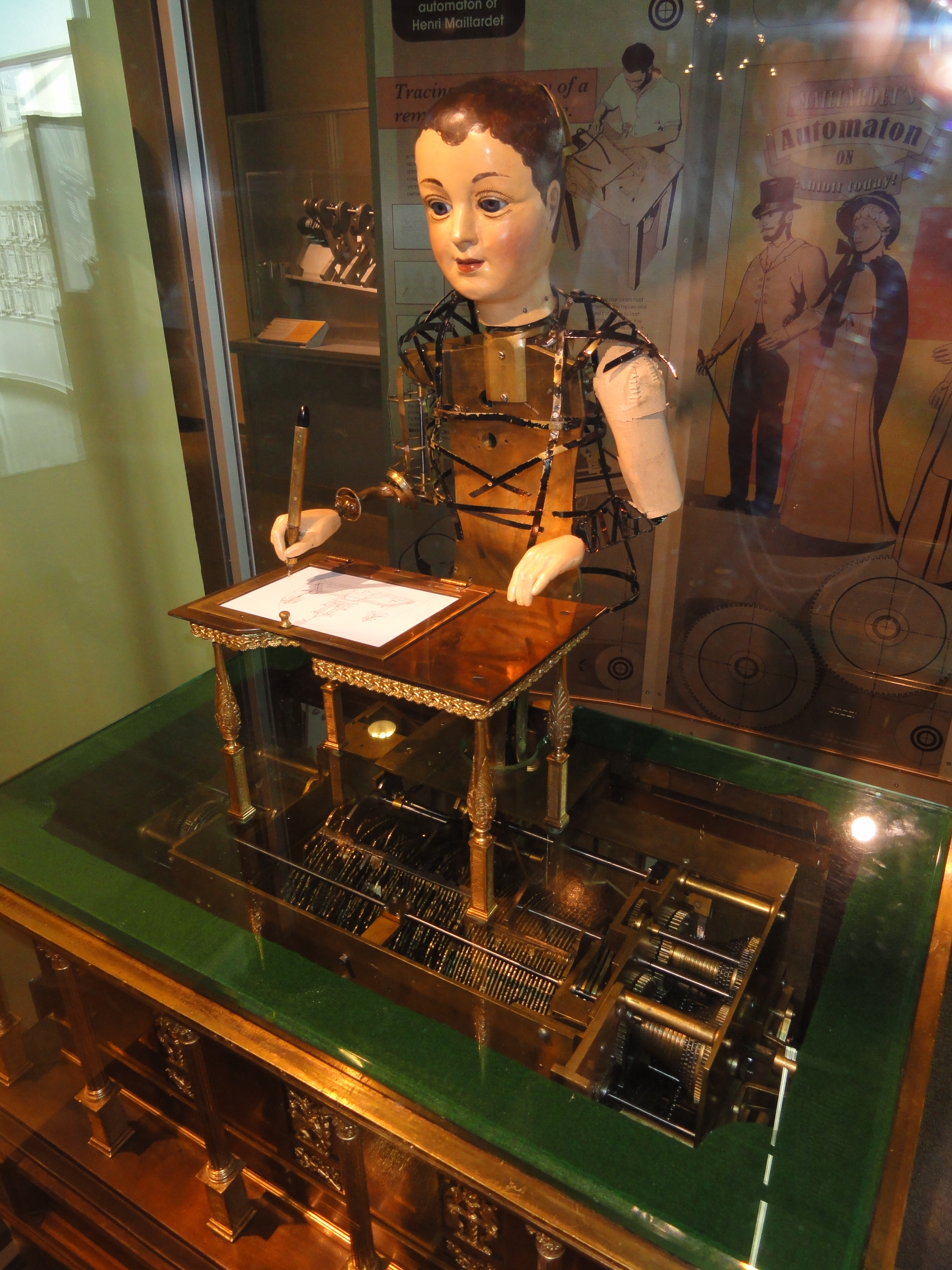
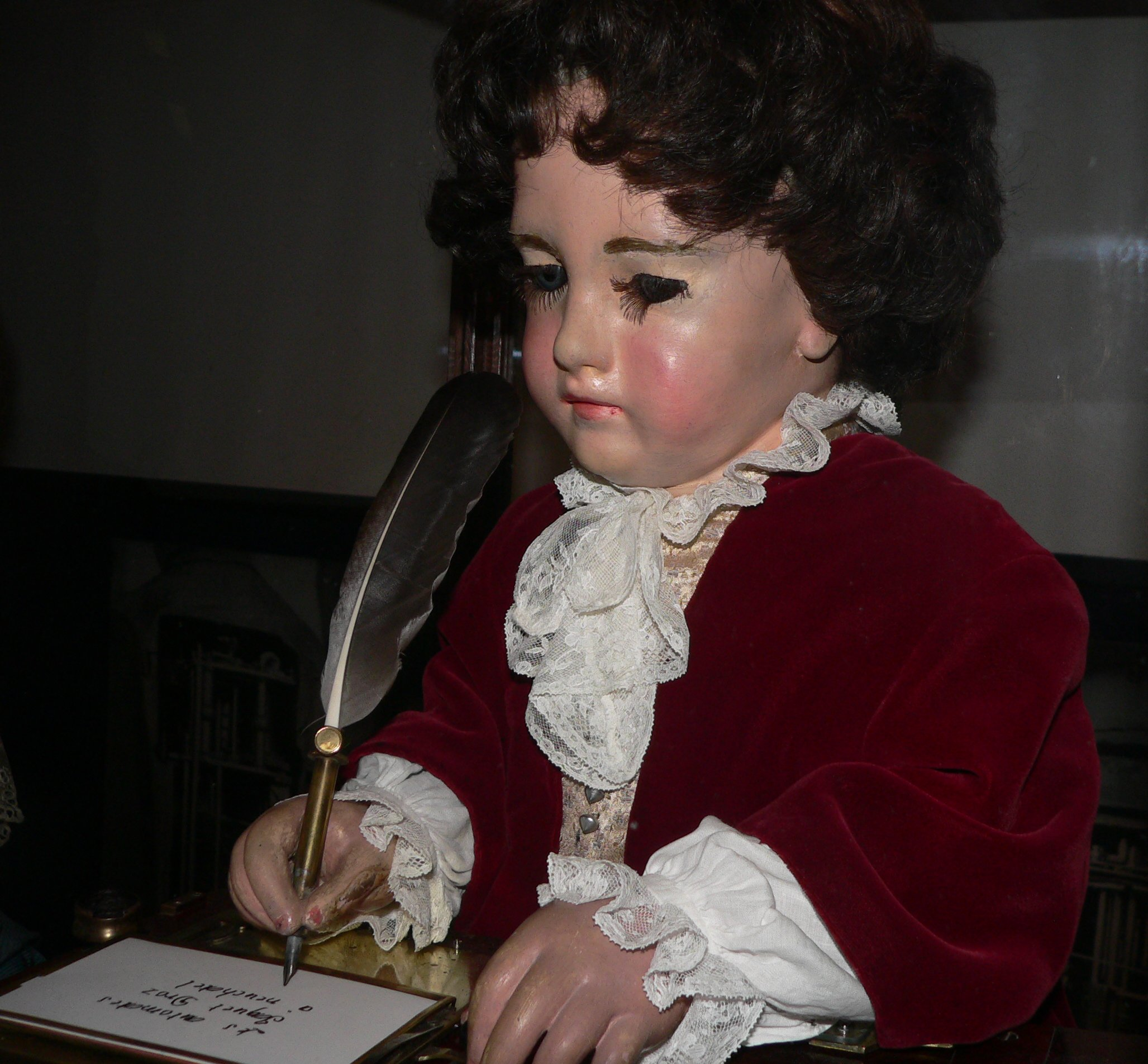
Maillardet's automaton (left) and the Jaquet-Droz automaton "the writer" (right) were inspirations for the design of the automaton in the film.

The backstory and primary features of Georges Méliès' life as depicted in the film are largely accurate: he became interested in film after seeing a demonstration of the Lumière brothers' camera; he was a magician and toymaker; he experimented with automata; he owned a theatre (Théâtre Robert-Houdin); he was forced into bankruptcy; his film stock was reportedly melted down for its celluloid; he became a toy salesman at the Montparnasse station, and he was eventually awarded the Légion d'honneur medal after a period of terrible neglect. Many of the early silent films shown in the movie are Méliès' actual works, such as Le voyage dans la lune (1902). However, the film does not mention Méliès' two children, his brother Gaston (who worked with Méliès during his film-making career), or his first wife Eugénie, who was married to Méliès during the time he made films (and who died in 1913). The film shows Méliès married to Jeanne d'Alcy during their filmmaking period, when in reality they did not marry until 1925.

The automaton's design was inspired by the Maillardet's automaton made by the Swiss watchmaker Henri Maillardet, which Selznick had seen in the Franklin Institute, Philadelphia, as well as the Jaquet-Droz automaton "the writer". A portion of the scene with Harold Lloyd in Safety Last! (1923), hanging from the clock, is shown when the main characters sneak into a movie theater. Later, Hugo, like Lloyd in Safety Last!, hangs from the hands of a large clock on a clock tower to escape from a pursuer.

Scenes in Hugo recreate viewings of silent films such as Méliès' A Trip to the Moon and the Lumière brothers' L'Arrivée d'un train en gare de La Ciotat.

Several viewings of the 1895 film L'Arrivée d'un train en gare de La Ciotat are portrayed, depicting the shocked reaction of the audience—although this view is in doubt.

Emil Lager, Ben Addis, and Robert Gill make cameo appearances as the father of Gypsy jazz guitar, Django Reinhardt, the Spanish surrealist painter Salvador Dalí, and the Irish writer James Joyce, respectively. The names of all three characters appear towards the end of the film's cast credit list.

The book that Monsieur Labisse gives Hugo as a gift, Robin Hood le proscrit (Robin Hood the outlaw), was written by Alexandre Dumas in 1864 as a French translation of an 1838 work by Pierce Egan the Younger in England. The book is symbolic, as Hugo must avoid the "righteous" law enforcement (Inspector Gustave) to live in the station and later to restore the automaton both to a functioning status and to its rightful owner. The particular copy given to Hugo looks like the 1917 English-language edition (David McKay publisher, Philadelphia, United States) with cover and interior illustrations by N.C. Wyeth, but with "Le Proscrit" added to the cover by the prop department. The film also depicts the Montparnasse derailment, when at 4:00 pm on 22 October 1895, the Granville–Paris Express overran the buffer stop at its Gare Montparnasse terminus.

In their confrontation with the Station Inspector, Isabelle claims she named her cat after the famous poet Christina Rossetti, as Isabelle then begins to recite the first lines of Rossetti's poem "A Birthday". Near the end of the film, Georges is in a discussion about the origins of filmmaking, and he and Jeanne mention the "cave pictographs in Niaux". This is a reference to the Cave of Niaux archeological site, which features ancient wall paintings that are thought to have been made 17,000 to 11,000 years ago.

== Reception ==
=== Box office ===
Hugo earned $15.4 million over its Thanksgiving weekend debut. It went on to earn US$73,864,507 domestically and $111,905,653 overseas, for a worldwide gross of $185,770,160. Despite praise from critics, Hugo was cited as one of the year's notable box-office flops. Its perceived failure was due to competition with Disney's The Muppets and Summit's Breaking Dawn Part 1. The film was estimated to have had a net loss of $100 million. Producer Graham King said that the film's box-office results were painful. "There's no finger-pointing—I'm the producer and I take the responsibility," he said. "Budget-wise, there just wasn't enough prep time and no one really realized how complicated doing a 3D film was going to be. I went through three line-producers because no one knew exactly what was going on. Do I still think it's a masterpiece that will be talked about in 20 years? Yes. But once the schedule started getting out of whack, things just spiraled and spiraled and that's when the avalanche began."

=== Critical reception ===
On review aggregator Rotten Tomatoes the film holds an approval rating of 93% with a mean of 8.3 of a possible 10 based on 232 reviews. The website's critical consensus reads, "Hugo is an extravagant, elegant fantasy with an innocence lacking in many modern kids' movies, and one that emanates an unabashed love for the magic of cinema." Metacritic assigned the film a weighted average score of 83 out of 100, based on 41 critics, indicating "universal acclaim". Audiences polled by CinemaScore gave the film an average grade of "B+" on an A+ to F scale.

Roger Ebert of the Chicago Sun-Times gave the film four out of four stars, saying that the film "is unlike any other film Martin Scorsese has ever made, and yet possibly the closest to his heart: a big-budget, family epic in 3-D, and in some ways, a mirror of his own life. We feel a great artist has been given command of the tools and resources he needs to make a movie about—movies." Peter Rainer of The Christian Science Monitor gave it a "B+" grade and termed it as "an odd mixture: a deeply personal impersonal movie" and concluded that "Hugo is a mixed bag but one well worth rummaging through." Christy Lemire said that the film had an "abundant love of the power of film; being a hardcore cinephile (like Scorsese) might add a layer of enjoyment, but it certainly isn't a prerequisite for walking in the door" besides being "slightly repetitive and overlong". Michael Phillips of the Chicago Tribune give it three stars and described it as "rich and stimulating even when it wanders," explaining "every locale in Scorsese's vision of 1931 Paris looks and feels like another planet. The filmmaker embraces storybook artifice as wholeheartedly as he relays the tale's lessons in the importance of film preservation." Joe Morgenstern of The Wall Street Journal said that Hugo "visually ... is a marvel, but dramatically it's a clockwork lemon".

Hugo was selected for the Royal Film Performance 2011 with a screening at the Odeon, Leicester Square, in London on 28 November 2011 in the presence of the Prince of Wales and the Duchess of Cornwall in support of the Cinema and Television Benevolent Fund. Richard Corliss of Time named it one of the Top 10 Best Movies of 2011, saying that "Scorsese's love poem, rendered gorgeously in 3-D, restores both the reputation of an early pioneer and the glory of movie history—the birth of a popular art form given new life through a master's application of the coolest new techniques". James Cameron called Hugo "a masterpiece" and that the film "had the best use of 3D [he] had seen," surpassing even his own acclaimed films.

==== Top-ten lists ====
The film appeared on the following critics' lists of the top-ten films of 2011:

Critic	Publication	Rank
David Denby	The New Yorker	1st
Sean Hobbit	Freelance	1st
Elizabeth Weitzman	New York Daily News	1st
Harry Knowles	Ain't It Cool News	1st
Shawn Levy	The Oregonian (Portland)	1st
Glenn Kenny	MSN Movies	2nd
Peter Hartlaub	San Francisco Chronicle	2nd
Richard Corliss	Time	2nd
Roger Ebert	Chicago Sun-Times	4th
Lisa Schwarzbaum	Entertainment Weekly	4th
Peter Paras	E! Online	5th
—N/a	MTV	5th
Todd McCarthy	The Hollywood Reporter	6th
Peter Travers	Rolling Stone	6th
—N/a	TV Guide	7th
J. Hoberman	The Village Voice	8th
Noel Murray	The A.V. Club	9th
Mark Kermode	BBC Radio 5 Live	9th
Kim Morgan	MSN Movies	9th
Keith Phipps	A.V. Club	9th
Sean Axmaker	MSN Movies	10th
Glenn Heath Jr.	Slant Magazine	10th
Jeff Simon	The Buffalo News	—N/a
Manohla Dargis	The New York Times	—N/a
Phillip French	The Observer	—N/a

=== Accolades ===
List of awards and nominations
Award / Film Festival	Date of Ceremony	Category	Recipient(s)	Result
Academy Awards	February 26, 2012	Best Picture	Graham King and Martin Scorsese	Nominated
Academy Awards	February 26, 2012	Best Director	Martin Scorsese	Nominated
Academy Awards	February 26, 2012	Best Adapted Screenplay	John Logan	Nominated
Academy Awards	February 26, 2012	Best Art Direction	Art Direction: Dante Ferretti; Set Decoration: Francesca Lo Schiavo	Won
Academy Awards	February 26, 2012	Best Cinematography	Robert Richardson	Won
Academy Awards	February 26, 2012	Best Costume Design	Sandy Powell	Nominated
Academy Awards	February 26, 2012	Best Film Editing	Thelma Schoonmaker	Nominated
Academy Awards	February 26, 2012	Best Original Score	Howard Shore	Nominated
Academy Awards	February 26, 2012	Best Sound Editing	Philip Stockton and Eugene Gearty	Won
Academy Awards	February 26, 2012	Best Sound Mixing	Tom Fleischman and John Midgley	Won
Academy Awards	February 26, 2012	Best Visual Effects	Robert Legato, Joss Williams, Ben Grossmann, and Alex Henning	Won
Argentine Academy of Cinematography Arts and Sciences Awards	December 5, 2012	Best Foreign Film	Graham King, Timothy Headington, Martin Scorsese, and Johnny Depp	Won
Alliance of Women Film Journalists	January 10, 2012	Best Picture	Graham King and Martin Scorsese	Nominated
Alliance of Women Film Journalists	January 10, 2012	Best Director	Martin Scorsese	Nominated
Alliance of Women Film Journalists	January 10, 2012	Best Adapted Screenplay	John Logan	Nominated
Alliance of Women Film Journalists	January 10, 2012	Best Cinematography	Robert Richardson	Nominated
Alliance of Women Film Journalists	January 10, 2012	Best Editing	Thelma Schoonmaker	Won
American Society of Cinematographers	February 12, 2012	Outstanding Achievement in Cinematography in a Feature Film	Robert Richardson	Nominated
Art Directors Guild	February 4, 2012	Period Film	Dante Ferretti	Won
Australian Academy of Cinema and Television Arts Awards	January 27, 2012	Best Film – International	Graham King and Martin Scorsese	Nominated
Australian Academy of Cinema and Television Arts Awards	January 27, 2012	Best Direction – International	Martin Scorsese	Nominated
Boston Society of Film Critics Award	December 11, 2011	Best Director	Martin Scorsese	Won
Boston Society of Film Critics Award	December 11, 2011	Best Film	Graham King and Martin Scorsese	Nominated
Boston Society of Film Critics Award	December 11, 2011	Best Cinematography	Robert Richardson	2nd Place
Boston Society of Film Critics Award	December 11, 2011	Best Editing	Thelma Schoonmaker	2nd Place
British Academy Film Awards	February 12, 2012	Best Director	Martin Scorsese	Nominated
British Academy Film Awards	February 12, 2012	Best Cinematography	Robert Richardson	Nominated
British Academy Film Awards	February 12, 2012	Best Original Score	Howard Shore	Nominated
British Academy Film Awards	February 12, 2012	Best Sound	Philip Stockton, Eugene Gearty, Tom Fleischman, and John Midgley	Won
British Academy Film Awards	February 12, 2012	Best Editing	Thelma Schoonmaker	Nominated
British Academy Film Awards	February 12, 2012	Best Production Design	Dante Ferretti and Francesca Lo Schiavo	Won
British Academy Film Awards	February 12, 2012	Best Costume Design	Sandy Powell	Nominated
British Academy Film Awards	February 12, 2012	Best Makeup and Hair	Morag Ross and Jan Archibald	Nominated
Critics' Choice Awards	January 12, 2012	Best Picture	Graham King and Martin Scorsese	Nominated
Critics' Choice Awards	January 12, 2012	Best Director	Martin Scorsese	Nominated
Critics' Choice Awards	January 12, 2012	Best Young Actor/Actress	Asa Butterfield	Nominated
Critics' Choice Awards	January 12, 2012	Best Adapted Screenplay	John Logan	Nominated
Critics' Choice Awards	January 12, 2012	Best Cinematography	Robert Richardson	Nominated
Critics' Choice Awards	January 12, 2012	Best Editing	Thelma Schoonmaker	Nominated
Critics' Choice Awards	January 12, 2012	Best Production Design/Art Direction	Dante Ferretti and Francesca Lo Schiavo	Won
Critics' Choice Awards	January 12, 2012	Best Score	Howard Shore	Nominated
Critics' Choice Awards	January 12, 2012	Best Costume Design	Sandy Powell	Nominated
Critics' Choice Awards	January 12, 2012	Best Visual Effects	Robert Legato	Nominated
Critics' Choice Awards	January 12, 2012	Best Sound	Philip Stockton, Eugene Gearty, Tom Fleischman, and John Midgley	Nominated
Chicago Film Critics Association	January 7, 2012	Best Film	Graham King and Martin Scorsese	Nominated
Chicago Film Critics Association	January 7, 2012	Best Director	Martin Scorsese	Nominated
Chicago Film Critics Association	January 7, 2012	Best Cinematography	Robert Richardson	Nominated
Chicago Film Critics Association	January 7, 2012	Best Original Score	Howard Shore	Nominated
David di Donatello Awards	May 4, 2012	Best Foreign Film	Hugo	Nominated
Detroit Film Critics Society	December 16, 2011	Best Film	Graham King and Martin Scorsese	Nominated
Detroit Film Critics Society	December 16, 2011	Best Director	Martin Scorsese	Nominated
Florida Film Critics Circle Awards	December 19, 2011	Best Director	Martin Scorsese	Won
Florida Film Critics Circle Awards	December 19, 2011	Best Film	Graham King and Martin Scorsese	Nominated
Florida Film Critics Circle Awards	December 19, 2011	Best Production Design/Art Direction	Dante Ferretti and Francesca Lo Schiavo	Won
Golden Globe Awards	January 15, 2012	Best Director	Martin Scorsese	Won
Golden Globe Awards	January 15, 2012	Best Motion Picture – Drama	Graham King and Martin Scorsese	Nominated
Golden Globe Awards	January 15, 2012	Best Original Score	Howard Shore	Nominated
Golden Trailer Awards	May 31, 2012	Best Animation/Family	"Imagine"	Nominated
Golden Trailer Awards	May 31, 2012	Best Animation/Family TV Spot	Hugo	Nominated
Grammy Awards	February 10, 2013	Best Score Soundtrack For Visual Media	Howard Shore	Nominated
Hugo Awards	September 2, 2012	Best Dramatic Presentation, Long Form	Martin Scorsese and John Logan	Nominated
Indiana Film Critics Association		Best Film	Graham King and Martin Scorsese	Nominated
Indiana Film Critics Association		Best Musical Score	Howard Shore	Nominated
Las Vegas Film Critics Society	December 13, 2011	Best Film	Graham King and Martin Scorsese	Nominated
Las Vegas Film Critics Society	December 13, 2011	Best Family Film	Hugo	Won
Las Vegas Film Critics Society	December 13, 2011	Best Film Editing	Thelma Schoonmaker	Won
Las Vegas Film Critics Society	December 13, 2011	Best Youth in Film	Asa Butterfield	Won
National Board of Review		Best Film	Graham King and Martin Scorsese	Won
National Board of Review		Best Director	Martin Scorsese	Won
New York Film Critics Circle Award	November 29, 2011	Best Director	Martin Scorsese	2nd Place
New York Film Critics Circle Award	November 29, 2011	Best Film	Graham King and Martin Scorsese	3rd Place
Online Film Critics Society Awards	January 2, 2012	Best Picture	Graham King and Martin Scorsese	Nominated
Online Film Critics Society Awards	January 2, 2012	Best Director	Martin Scorsese	Nominated
Online Film Critics Society Awards	January 2, 2012	Best Cinematography	Robert Richardson	Nominated
Phoenix Film Critics Society	December 27, 2011	Best Picture	Graham King and Martin Scorsese	Nominated
Phoenix Film Critics Society	December 27, 2011	Best Director	Martin Scorsese	Nominated
Phoenix Film Critics Society	December 27, 2011	Best Adapted Screenplay	John Logan	Nominated
Phoenix Film Critics Society	December 27, 2011	Best Cinematography	Robert Richardson	Nominated
Phoenix Film Critics Society	December 27, 2011	Best Production Design	Dante Ferretti	Won
Phoenix Film Critics Society	December 27, 2011	Best Costume Design	Sandy Powell	Nominated
Phoenix Film Critics Society	December 27, 2011	Best Visual Effects	Robert Legato	Won
Phoenix Film Critics Society	December 27, 2011	Best Live Action Family Film	Hugo	Nominated
Ray Bradbury Award	May 18, 2013	Ray Bradbury Award for Outstanding Dramatic Presentation	Martin Scorsese and John Logan	Nominated
Satellite Awards	December 19, 2011	Best Film	Graham King and Martin Scorsese	Nominated
Satellite Awards	December 19, 2011	Best Director	Martin Scorsese	Nominated
Satellite Awards	December 19, 2011	Best Art Direction and Production Design	Dante Ferretti and Francesca Lo Schiavo	Nominated
Satellite Awards	December 19, 2011	Best Cinematography	Robert Richardson	Nominated
Satellite Awards	December 19, 2011	Best Visual Effects	Robert Legato	Won
San Diego Film Critics Society Awards	December 14, 2011	Best Production Design	Dante Ferretti	Won
San Diego Film Critics Society Awards	December 14, 2011	Best Film	Graham King and Martin Scorsese	Nominated
San Diego Film Critics Society Awards	December 14, 2011	Best Director	Martin Scorsese	Nominated
San Diego Film Critics Society Awards	December 14, 2011	Best Adapted Screenplay	John Logan	Nominated
San Diego Film Critics Society Awards	December 14, 2011	Best Cinematography	Robert Richardson	Nominated
San Diego Film Critics Society Awards	December 14, 2011	Best Editing	Thelma Schoonmaker	Nominated
San Diego Film Critics Society Awards	December 14, 2011	Best Score	Howard Shore	Nominated
Saturn Awards	June 20, 2012	Best Fantasy Film	Hugo	Nominated
Saturn Awards	June 20, 2012	Best Actor	Ben Kingsley	Nominated
Saturn Awards	June 20, 2012	Best Performance by a Younger Actor	Asa Butterfield	Nominated
Saturn Awards	June 20, 2012	Best Performance by a Younger Actor	Chloë Grace Moretz	Nominated
Saturn Awards	June 20, 2012	Best Director	Martin Scorsese	Nominated
Saturn Awards	June 20, 2012	Best Writing	John Logan	Nominated
Saturn Awards	June 20, 2012	Best Music	Howard Shore	Nominated
Saturn Awards	June 20, 2012	Best Costume	Sandy Powell	Nominated
Saturn Awards	June 20, 2012	Best Production Design	Dante Ferretti	Won
Saturn Awards	June 20, 2012	Best Editing	Thelma Schoonmaker	Nominated
Visual Effects Society Awards	February 7, 2012	Outstanding Supporting Visual Effects in a Feature Motion Picture	Ben Grossmann, Alex Henning, Rob Legato, Karen Murphy	Won
Visual Effects Society Awards	February 7, 2012	Outstanding Models in a Feature Motion Picture	Scott Beverly for "Train Crash"	Nominated
Visual Effects Society Awards	February 7, 2012	Outstanding Virtual Cinematography in a Live Action Feature Motion Picture	Martin Chamney, Rob Legato, Adam Watkins, Fabio Zangla	Won
Washington D.C. Area Film Critics Association Awards	December 5, 2011	Best Director	Martin Scorsese	Won
Washington D.C. Area Film Critics Association Awards	December 5, 2011	Best Art Direction	Dante Ferretti	Won
Washington D.C. Area Film Critics Association Awards	December 5, 2011	Best Film	Graham King and Martin Scorsese	Nominated
Washington D.C. Area Film Critics Association Awards	December 5, 2011	Best Acting Ensemble	Hugo	Nominated
Washington D.C. Area Film Critics Association Awards	December 5, 2011	Best Adapted Screenplay	John Logan	Nominated
Washington D.C. Area Film Critics Association Awards	December 5, 2011	Best Cinematography	Robert Richardson	Nominated
Washington D.C. Area Film Critics Association Awards	December 5, 2011	Best Score	Howard Shore	Nominated
World Soundtrack Academy	October 20, 2012	Best Original Score of the Year	Howard Shore	Nominated
World Soundtrack Academy	October 20, 2012	Soundtrack Composer of the Year	Howard Shore	Nominated
Young Artist Awards	May 6, 2012	Best Performance in a Feature Film - Leading Young Actor	Asa Butterfield	Nominated
Young Artist Awards	May 6, 2012	Best Performance in a Feature Film - Leading Young Actress	Chloë Grace Moretz	Won
