= The writing hand =

Mechanical automaton created by Friedrich von Knauss in 1764

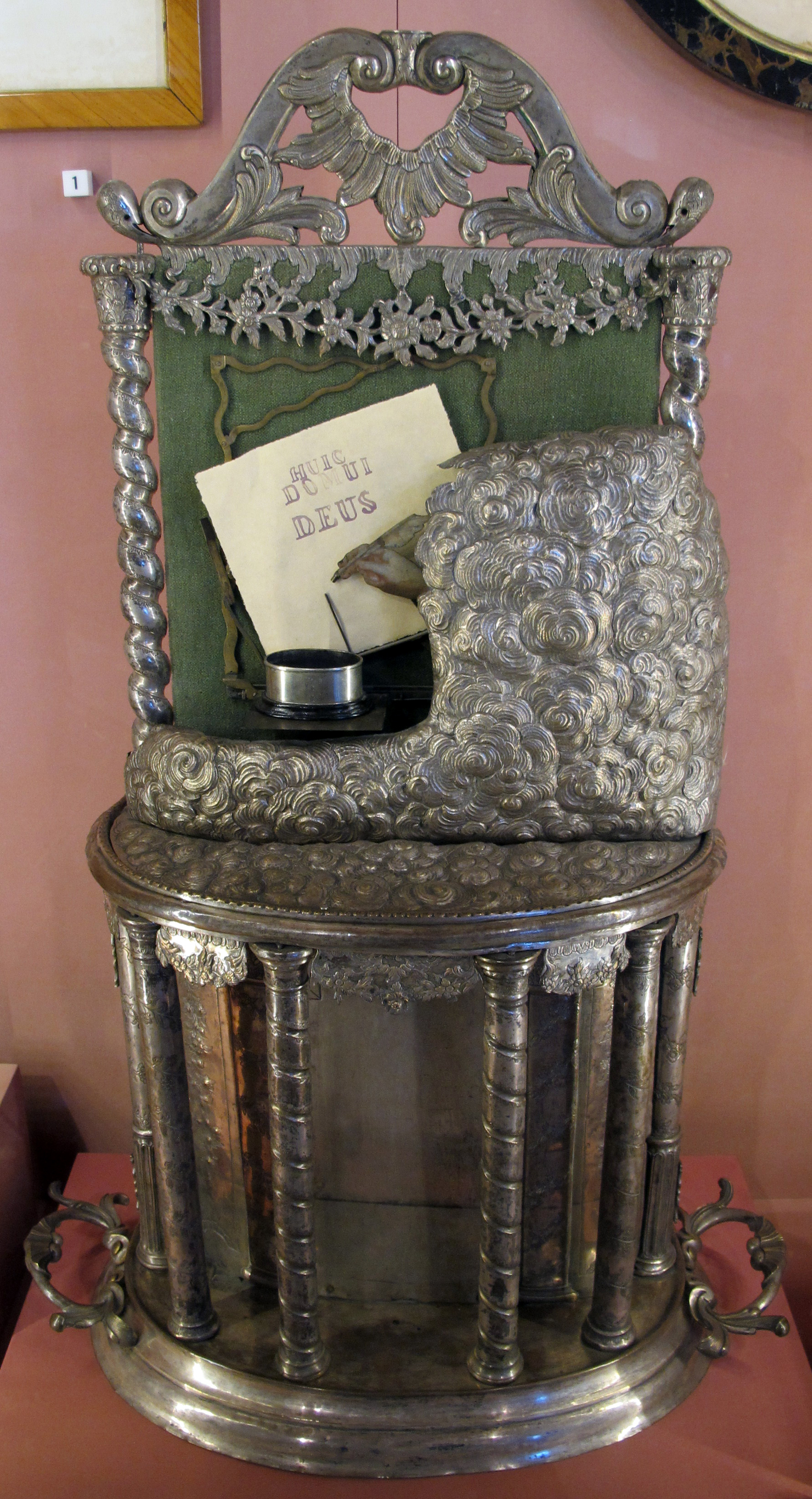
Knauss's "writing hand"

The writing hand is a mechanical automaton created by Friedrich von Knauss in 1764. A clockwork mechanism moves a hand which dips a pen into an inkstand and writes the phrase "Huic Domui Deus / Nec metas rerum / Nec tempora ponat" ("May God not impose ends or deadlines on this house") on a small card. On the silver-coating of the mechanism are the words "Pro patria".

The instrument was dedicated by von Knauss to the House of Lorraine, which ruled at that time in Tuscany.

The object is housed in Room 10 of the Museo Galileo in Florence (inventory no. 3195). It is made of copper and silver and measures 680mm x 1000mm.

== See also ==
- Maillardet's automaton

== Bibliography ==
- Istituto e Museo di storia della scienza (Firenze) (1991). Mara Miniati (ed.). Museo di storia della scienza: catalogo. Firenze: Giunti. p. 220. ISBN 88-09-20036-5.
