= Laura Droz =

Swiss footballer (born 2000)

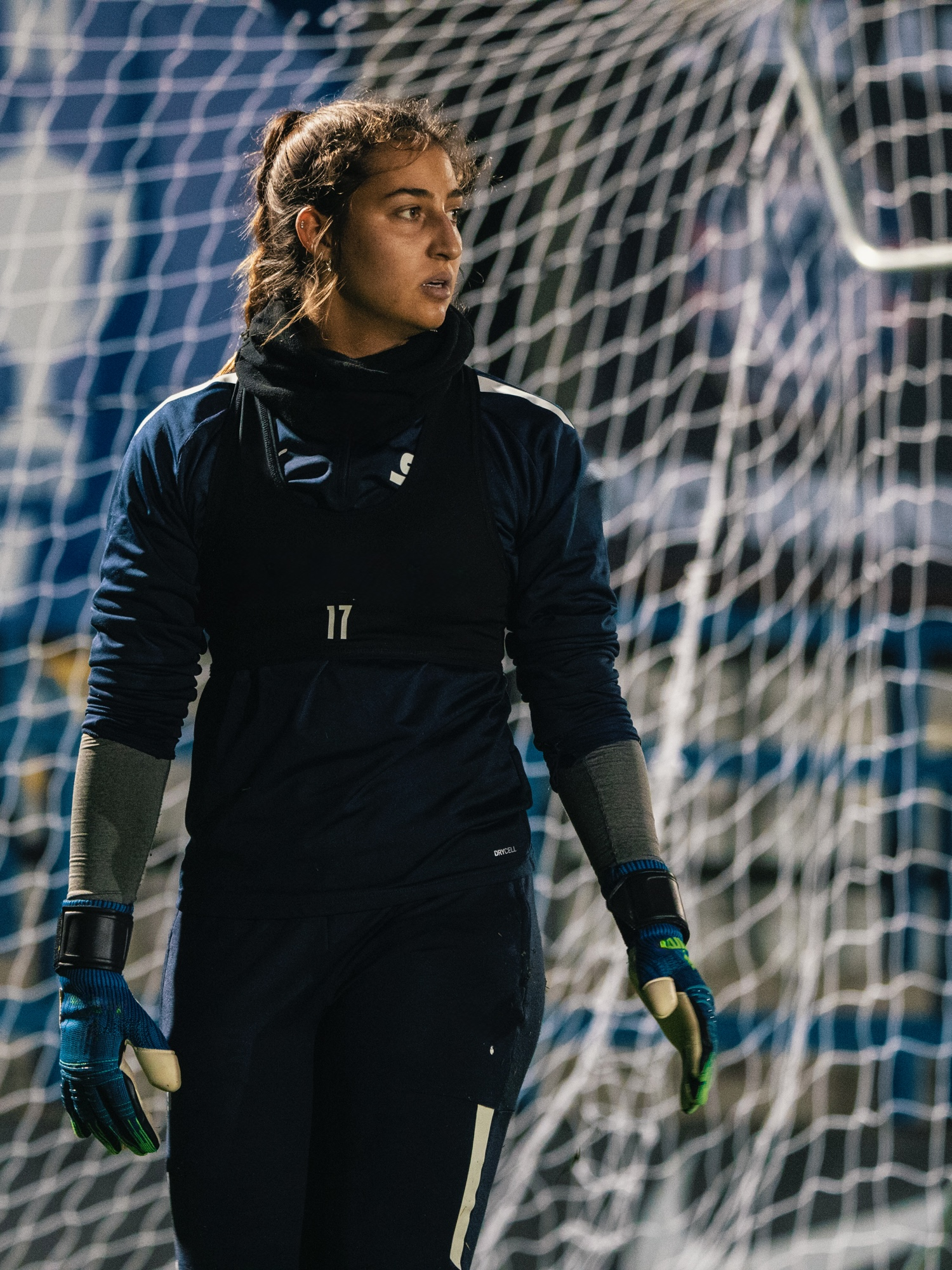

Personal information
- Full name: Laura Nadine Droz
- Date of birth: 15 March 2000 (age 26)
- Place of birth: Payerne, Switzerland
- Position: Goalkeeper

Team information
- Current team: FC Yverdon
- Number: 1

Senior career*
Years	Team	Apps	(Gls)
2017–2019	FC Yverdon		
2019–2020	FC Basel		
2020–2021	AS Nancy Lorraine		
2021–2023	Servette FC Chênois		
2023–2024	1. FFC Turbine Potsdam		
2024–2025	Standard Liège		
2025–	FC Yverdon		
- * Club domestic league appearances and goals

Laura Droz (born 15 March 2000) is a Swiss footballer who plays as a goalkeeper for FC Yverdon. Droz has previously played for Turbine Potsdam, Yverdon, FC Basel, Nancy and Servette FC.
