= Pierre Jaquet-Droz =

Watchmaker from Neuchâtel (1721–1790)

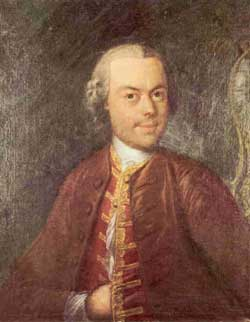
Pierre Jaquet-Droz

Pierre Jaquet-Droz (French: [ʒakɛ dʁo]; 1721–1790) was a watchmaker of the late eighteenth century. He was born on 28 July 1721 in La Chaux-de-Fonds, in the Principality of Neuchâtel. He lived in Paris, London, and Geneva, where he designed and built animated dolls known as automata to help his firm sell watches and mechanical caged songbirds.

The Jaquet Droz luxury watch brand is now owned by The Swatch Group.

== Notable works ==
Constructed between 1768 and 1774 by Pierre Jaquet-Droz, his son Henri-Louis (1752–1791), and Jean-Frédéric Leschot (1746–1824), the automata include The Writer (made of 6000 pieces), The Musician (2500 pieces), and The Draughtsman (2000 pieces).

His astonishing mechanisms fascinated the kings and emperors of Europe, China, India and Japan.

Some consider these devices to be the oldest examples of the computer. The Writer, a mechanical boy who writes with a quill pen upon paper with real ink, has an input device to set tabs, defining individual letters written by the boy, that form a programmable memory. It has 40 cams that represent the read-only program. The work of Pierre Jaquet-Droz predates that of Charles Babbage by decades.

The automata of Jaquet-Droz are considered to be some of the finest examples of human mechanical problem solving. Three particularly complex and still functional dolls, now known as the Jaquet-Droz automata, are housed at the Musée d'Art et d'Histoire (art and history museum) in Neuchâtel, Switzerland.

He once constructed a clock that was capable of the following surprising movements:

There were seen on it a negro, a dog, and a shepherd; when the clock struck, the shepherd played six tunes on his flute, and the dog approached and fawned upon him. This clock was exhibited to the King of Spain, who was delighted with it. "The gentleness of my dog," said Droz, "is his least merit; if your Majesty touch one of the apples, which you see in the shepherd's basket, you will admire the fidelity of this animal." The King took an apple, and the dog flew at his hand, and barked so loud, that the King's dog, which was in the room, began also to bark; at this the Courtiers, not doubting that it was an affair of witchcraft, hastily left the room, crossing themselves as they went out. The minister of Marine was the only one that ventured to stay. The king having desired him to ask the negro what o'clock it was, the minister obeyed, but he obtained no reply. Droz then observed, that the negro had not yet learned Spanish.

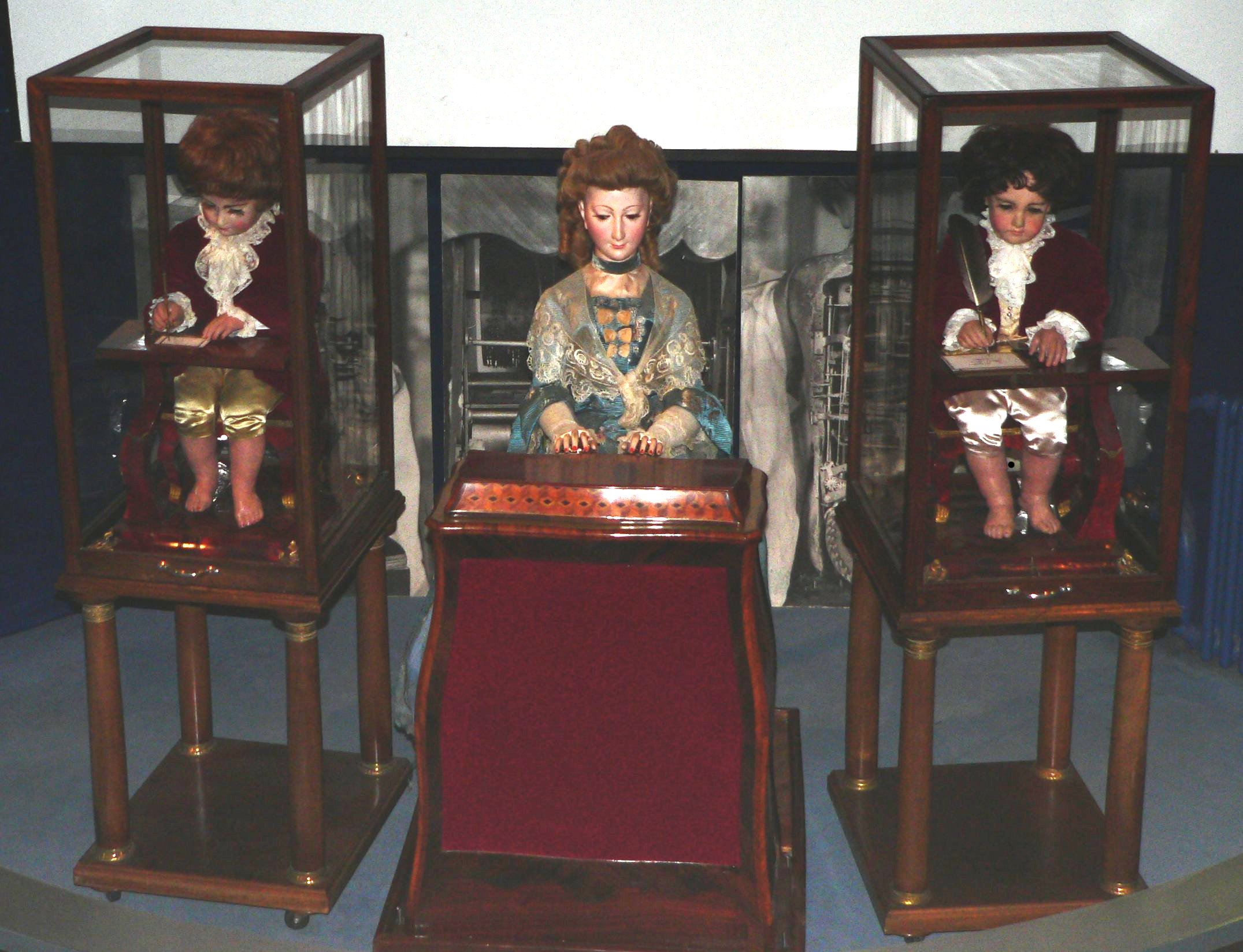
The Jaquet-Droz automata

== See also ==
- Maillardet's automaton
- Android
- Humanoid robot
- Singing bird box
