= Henri Maillardet =

Swiss mechanician (1745–1830)

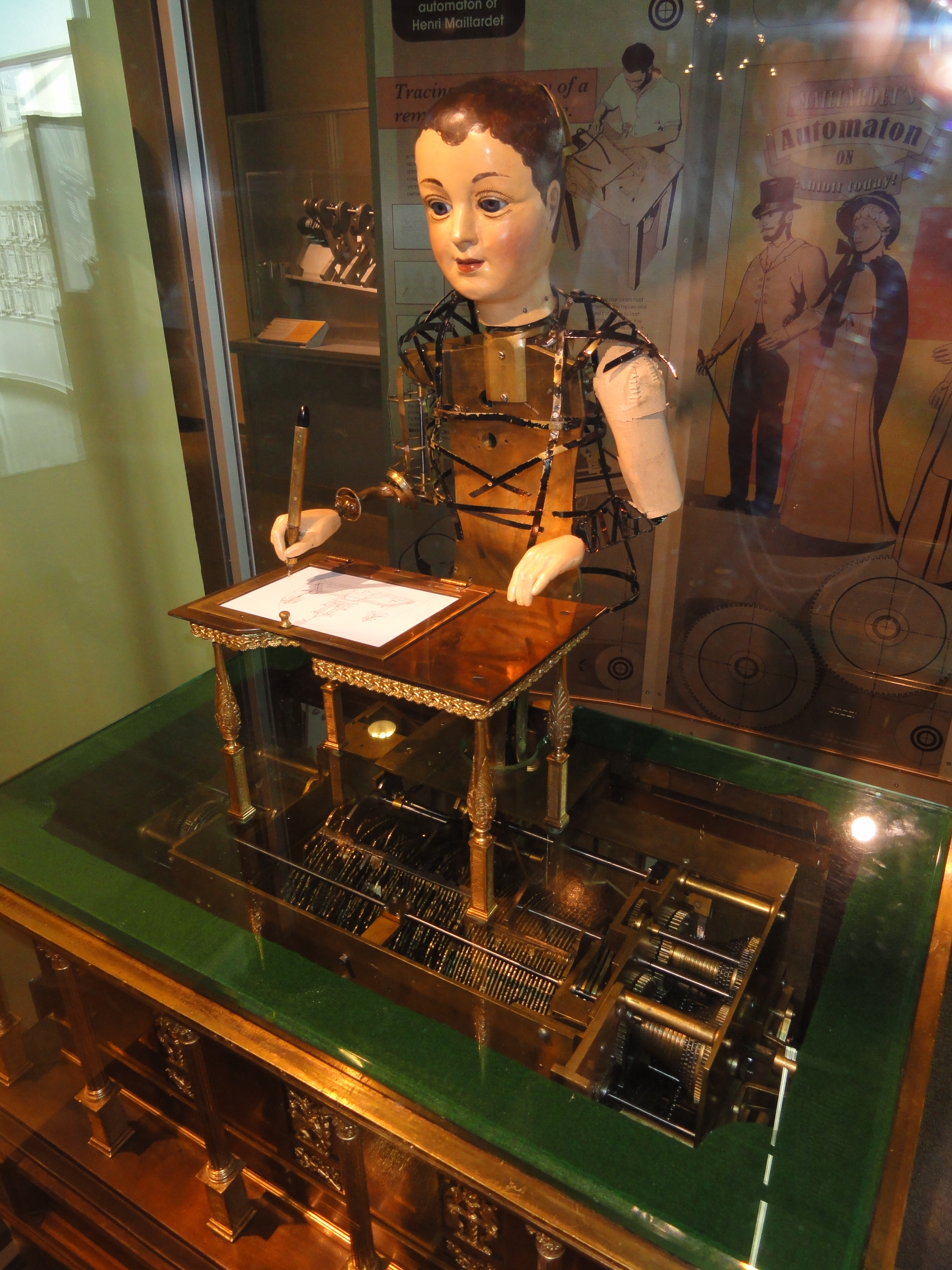
The "Draughtsman-Writer" automaton by Henri Maillardet, circa 1805

Henri Maillardet (born Jean Henri Nicholas Maillardet; 1745–1830), was a Swiss mechanician of the 18th century who worked in London producing clocks and other mechanisms. He spent a period of time in the shops of Pierre Jaquet-Droz, who was in the business of producing watches, clocks, and automata.

With his brothers Jaques-Rodolphe and Jean David Maillardet, Henri produced a series of automata depicting magicians.

In 1805 Henri Maillardet built a spring-activated automaton that draws pictures and writes verses in both French and English. The motions of the hand are produced by a series of cams located on shafts in the base of the automaton, which produces the necessary movement to complete seven sketches and the text. It is believed that this automaton has the largest cam-based memory of any automaton of the era.

When first presented to the Franklin Institute in Philadelphia in 1928, the automaton was of unknown origin. Once restored to working order, the automaton itself provided the answer when it penned the words "written by the automaton of Maillardet".

Maillardet died in Malines, Belgium, in 1830 where he is buried.

== See also ==
- Automaton
- Pierre Jaquet-Droz
