= Jaquet-Droz automata =

Doll automata built between 1768 and 1774

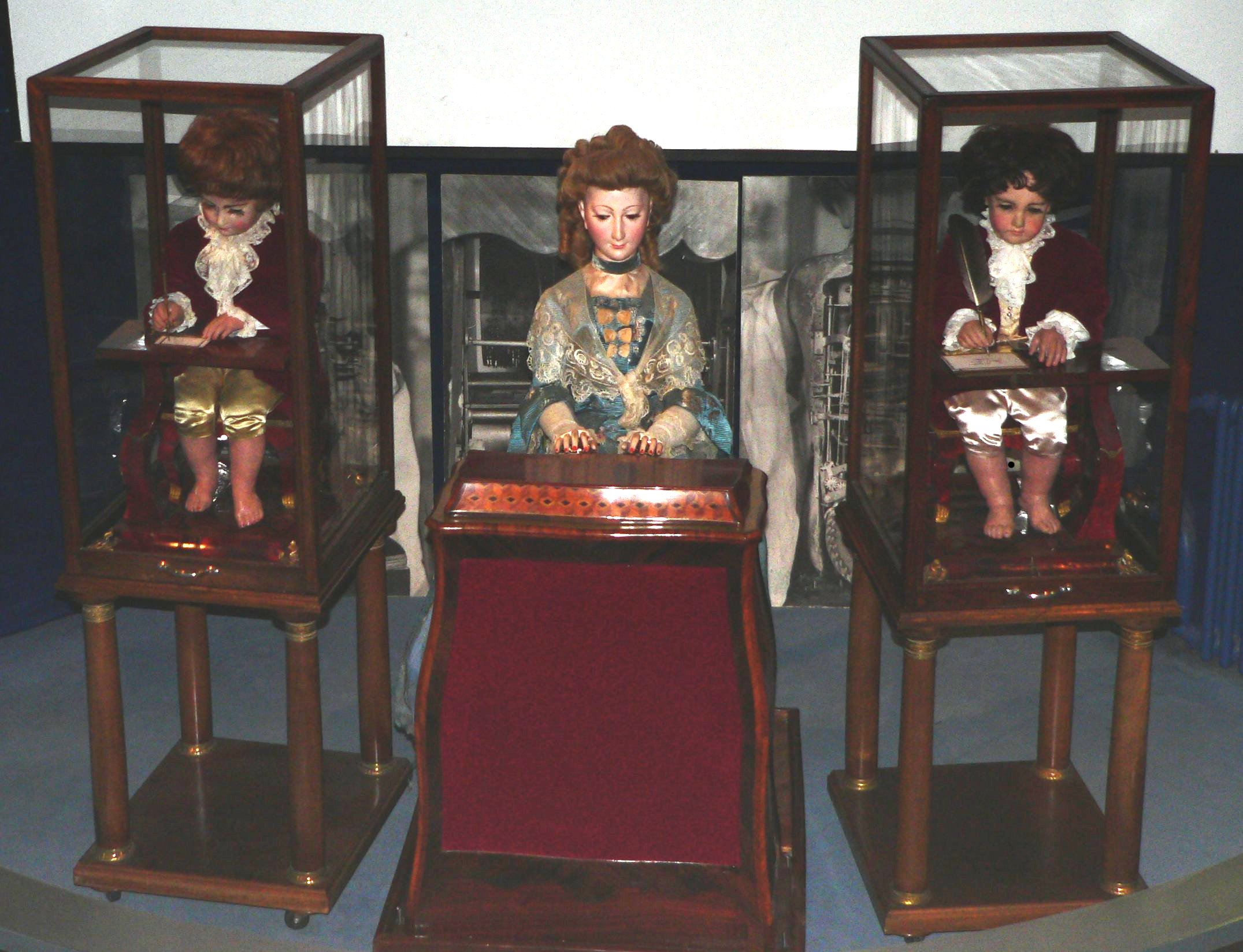
The Jaquet-Droz automata

The Jaquet-Droz automata, among all the numerous automata built by the Jaquet-Droz family, refer to three doll automata built between 1768 and 1774 by Pierre Jaquet-Droz, his son Henri-Louis, and Jean-Frédéric Leschot: the musician, the draughtsman and the writer. The dolls are still functional, and can be seen at the Musée d'Art et d'Histoire of Neuchâtel, in Switzerland. They are considered to be among the remote ancestors of modern computers. There was also a fourth automaton, called "the Cave", which was a big diorama with a palace carved on a rock, gardens and figurines, which has disappeared.

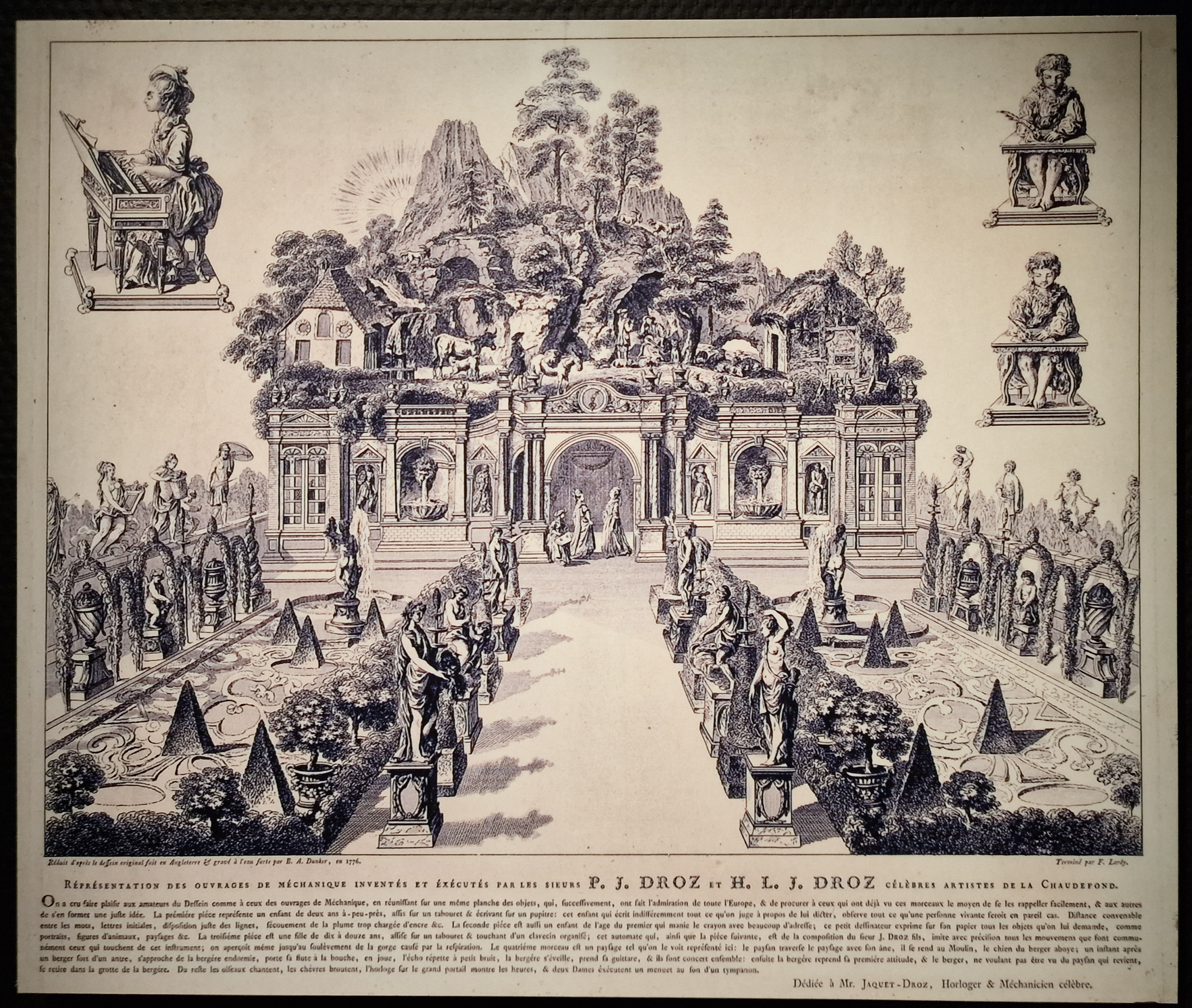
The four automata

The automata were designed and built by Pierre Jaquet-Droz, Henri-Louis Jaquet-Droz and Jean-Frédéric Leschot as advertisement and entertainment toys designed to improve the sales of watches among the nobility of Europe in the 18th century. They were carried around, and lost at several points. The History and Archeology society of Neuchâtel eventually bought them in 1906, for 75,000 gold francs, and gave them to the museum.

== The musician ==
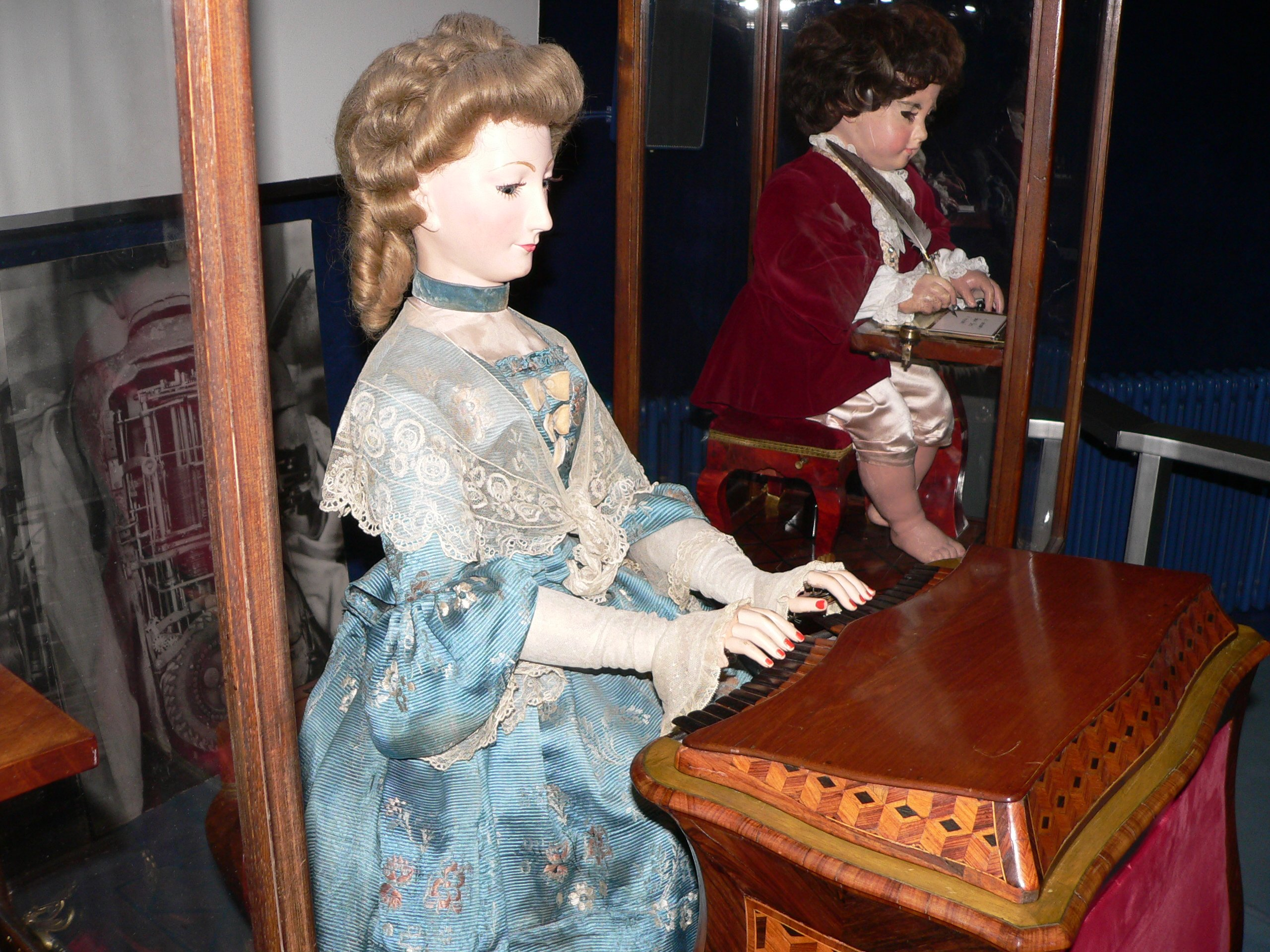
The musician

The musician is modelled as a female organ player. The music is not recorded or played by a musical box: the doll plays a genuine, custom-built instrument by pressing the keys with her fingers. Movements of her chest show her "breathing", and she follows her fingers with her head and eyes. The automaton also makes some of the movements that a real player would do, such as balancing the torso.

== The draughtsman ==
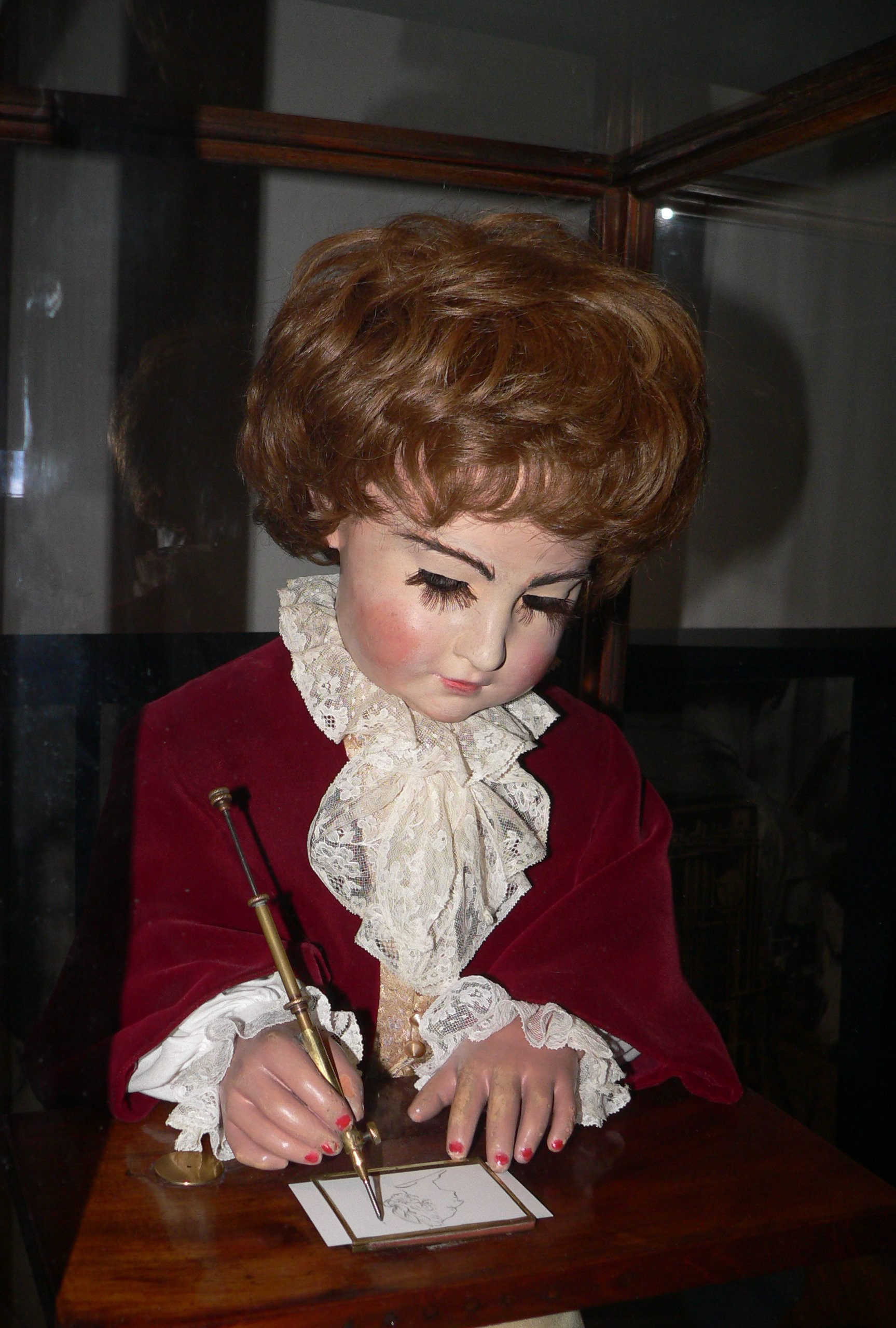
The draughtsman

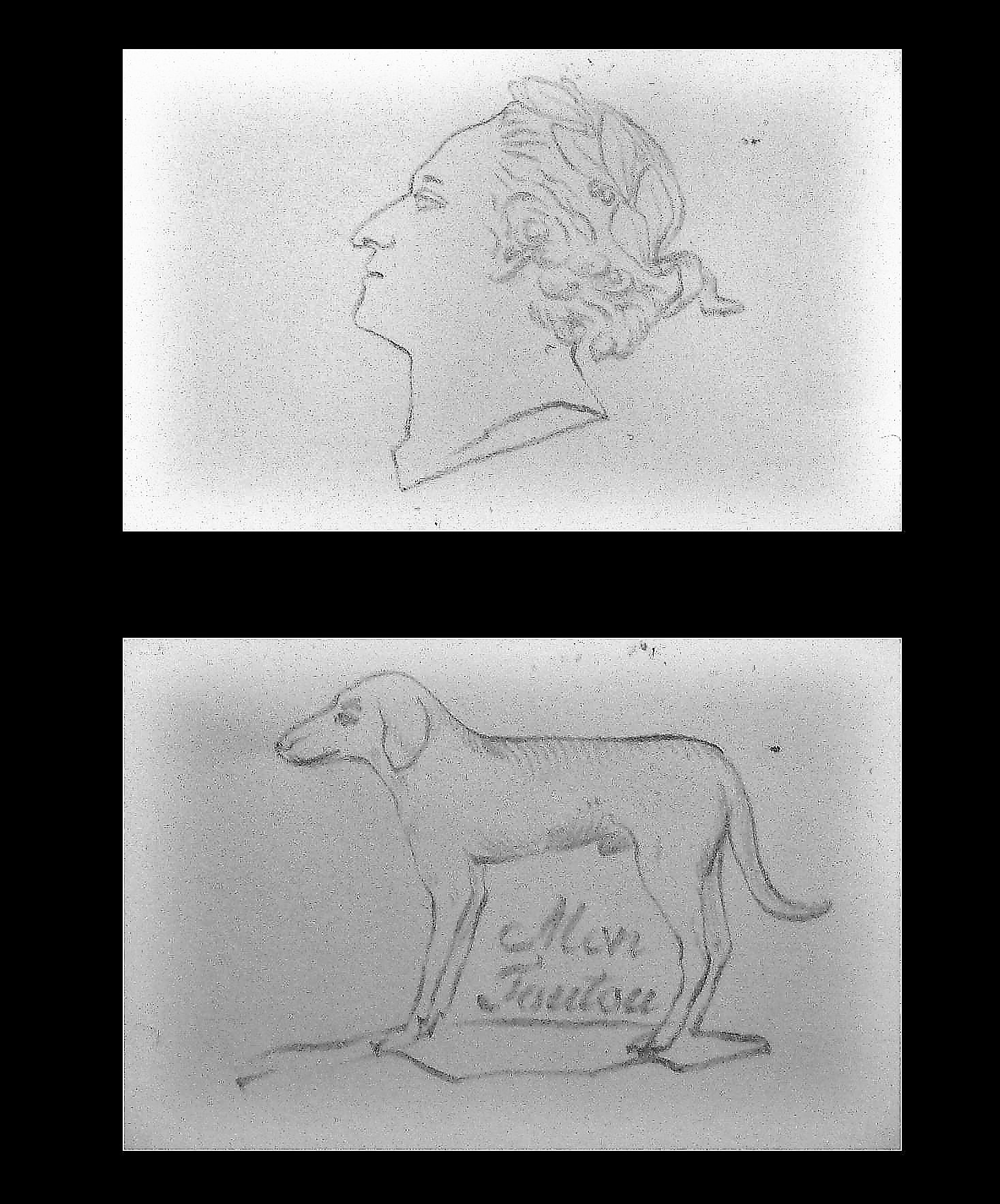
Two of the drawings that can be made by the draughtsman

The draughtsman is modelled as a young child, and is capable of drawing four different images: a portrait of Louis XV, a royal couple (believed to be Marie Antoinette and Louis XVI), a dog with "Mon toutou" ("my doggy") written beside it, and a scene of Cupid driving a chariot pulled by a butterfly.

The draughtsman works by using a system of cams that code the movements of the hand in two dimensions, plus one to lift the pencil. The automaton also moves on his chair, and he periodically blows on the pencil to remove dust.

== The writer ==
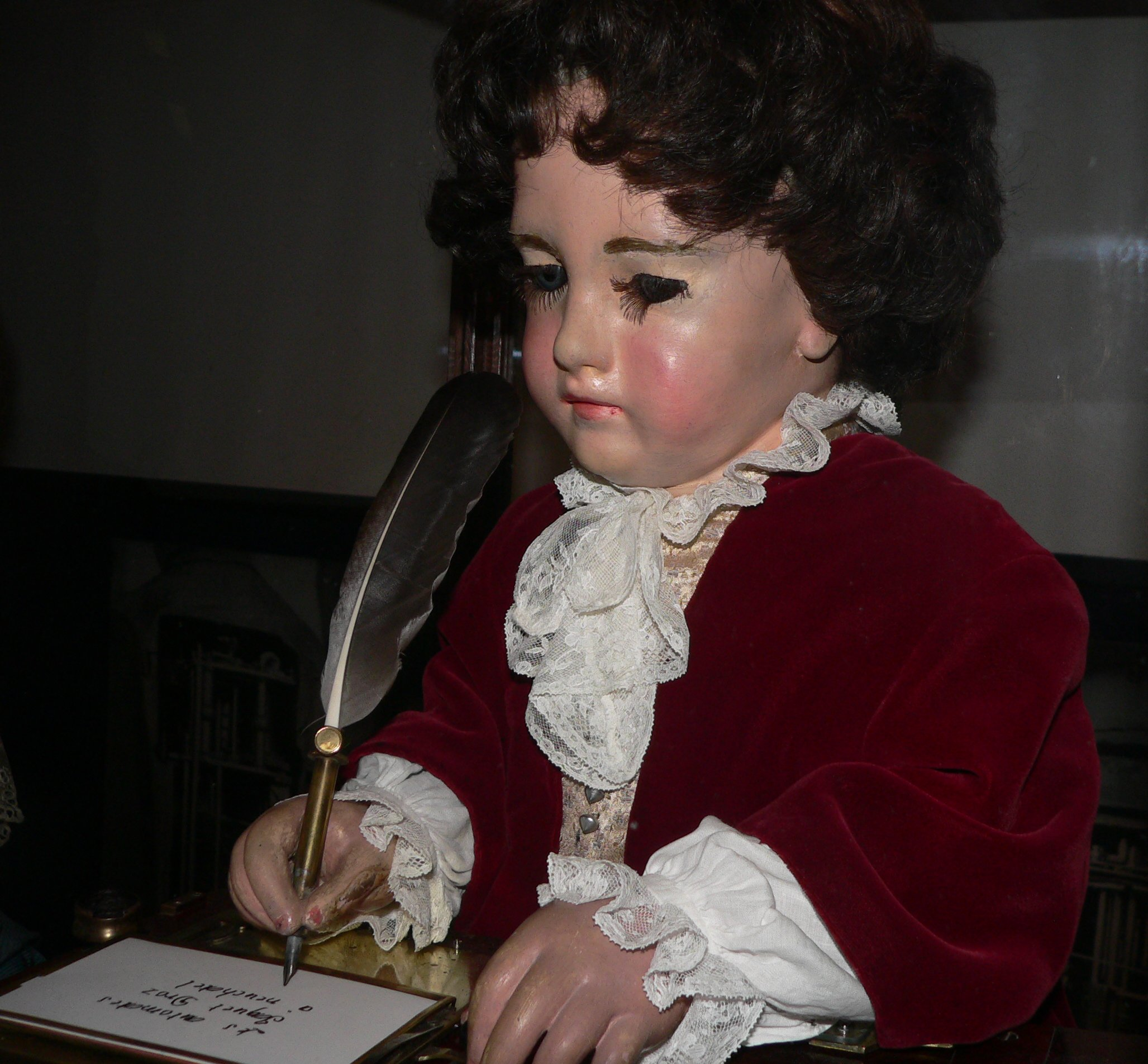
The writer

The writer is the most complex of the three automata. Using a system similar to the one used for the draughtsman for each letter, he is able to write any custom text up to 40 letters long (the text is rarely changed; one of the latest instances was in honour of president François Mitterrand when he toured the city). The text is coded on a wheel where characters are selected one by one. He uses a goose feather to write, which he inks from time to time, including a shake of the wrist to prevent ink from spilling. His eyes follow the text being written, and his head moves when he takes some ink. The writer is 70 cm (2 ft 4 in) tall.

== See also ==
- Hugo (2011 film)
- Maillardet's automaton
