= Blaise Bontems =

Blaise Bontems (15 March 1814 Le Ménil - 1893) was a French specialist in the manufacture of automaton singing birds and the first of a dynasty of automaton manufacturers, which included his son Charles Jules and his grandson Lucien. Bontems' birds were famous for the realism of their song.

== See also ==
- Automaton
- Singing bird box
