= Singing bird box =

Automaton bird in a decorative box

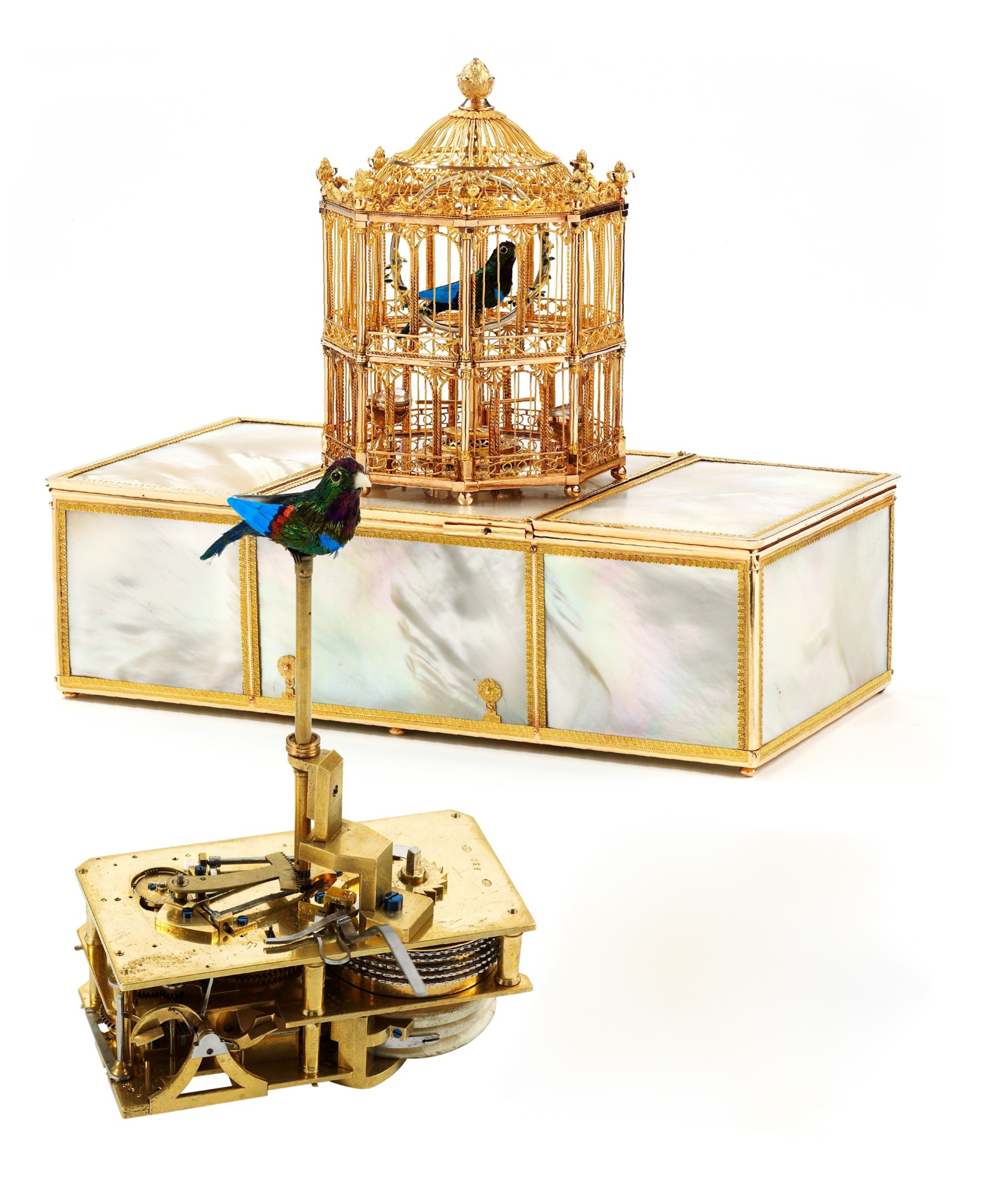
An unusual singing bird box by Frères Rochat, c. 1810. The bird is shown in a tiny cage, not concealed inside the box as usual.

A singing bird box (boîte à oiseau chanteur in French) is a box, usually rectangular-shaped, which contains within a miniature automaton singing bird concealed below an oval lid and activated by means of an operating lever.

Its origins are found in the city of Geneva and its invention in 1784/85 is attributed to Pierre Jaquet-Droz.

The French term tabatière has also come to be used for any small decorative box resembling a snuffbox in form but not necessarily any longer used to contain snuff.

== Characteristics ==
This object is made up of two separate parts, habitually crafted by different makers. The outer casing is a rectangular box variable in size, although with a standard measurement of approximately 100 × 65 × 40 mm, made of base metal, precious metal, tortoiseshell or other materials. It has an oval hole, some 45 x 35 mm in its top, edged normally by a decorative metal bezel.

On the front of the box there is a small slider that when it is pushed to the right, the lid or medallion lifts to a near-vertical position, and a small, mechanical feathered bird pops through a grille and stands upright at the front centre of the oval opening. Then it begins to turn from side to side, to flap its wings, move its tail up and down, open and shut its beak and – in some cases – turn its head from side to side, while producing an unbroken stream of birdsong. At the end of the performance the automaton falls back into the box and the lid closes.

While the bird is calling, a decorative pierced grille appears with a bird-shaped hole cut into it through which the performer rises and falls. While singing, a bird-shaped piece of grille jumps up to cover the hole through which the automaton has passed.

All bird box movements have a clock-work motor which must be wound up. This motor is doing two basic jobs: The first one is to operate a small bellows which supplies air, via a wind chest, to a whistle which produces the birdsong and the second task is to rotate a number of cams. One cam controls the note produced by the whistle, a second determines when the note will be produced and for how long, and a third one produces the motion which causes the bird to turn from side to side. In some movements the flapping of the bird's wings and its ability to turn its head are also cam-controlled, in others not. The final cam determines the point at which the song ends, the bird folds away, the lid drops and the motor stops. The bird's beak movements are always connected to the cam controlling the air supply to the whistle: in this way the sound and beak movements are automatically synchronized.

The whistle consists of a miniature organ pipe containing a close-fitting piston which can be moved up and down to give a range of notes of over an octave.

The winged performer varies in size but 30 mm from beak to tail is common. The bird itself consists of a brass frame to which two half-body shells are attached, each half-shell having one wing pivoted to its side. To dress a few of them, feathers of South American hummingbirds were utilized in the past for their brilliant red, green and blue iridescent colours, which gave a well feathered bird an almost jewel-like appearance, but nowadays they are no longer available.

As for the movement, this is a compact device located between two brass plates. Two mechanisms have been used during the more than two centuries of singing bird boxes, each with its own characteristics: The fusee-driven movement and the going-barrel movement.

== Origins and evolution from the 18th to the 21st century ==
=== Switzerland: The cradle of the singing bird box and its development (1785–1885) ===
Besides sharing the same nationality, the major names in the early history of the singing bird box are all united by professional links.

To Pierre Jaquet-Droz (born 1721), regarded as one of the most celebrated automata maker of all times, is credited the invention of the boîte à oiseau chanteur. In the book Le Monde des Automates by Chapuis and Gélis record that between 1770 and 1784 several makers including Jaquet-Droz and Jean-Frédéric Leschot (b. 1746) were making singing bird cages in which the bird song was produced by a miniature pipe-organ requiring a separate pipe for each note. The work to miniaturize the mechanical bird and develop a compact movement using a one and only single pipe of variable pitch was all completed in the year 1784/1785 and this component made possible the reduction in size of the movement and as a consequence giving rise to the birth of the singing bird box.

It is possible that this was mainly the work of Leschot, who became a partner in the Jaquet-Droz business in 1782. Indeed, Chapuis and Gélis claim that the variable pitch whistle was the work of Leschot, however another author, Brittens, claims that the credit for its invention belongs to Henri Maillardet (1745–1815), who also joined the company in 1784, although probably Jaquet-Droz should be credited with it. Whoever it was, it is clear that by 1785 snuffbox or tabatière-sized movements were known in France, Germany and England. These mechanisms were the work of a small group of skilled and talented men laboring in Geneva, led by Pierre Jaquet-Droz and his son Henri-Louis Jaquet-Droz (b. 1752) and including Leschot, Maillardet and Jacob Frisard.

In November 1790, Pierre Jaquet-Droz died (followed by his son Henri the year later) and this logically ended the partnership with Leschot. However, Leschot continued to produce singing birds in Geneva under the old partnership name of "Jaquet-Droz & Leschot – London" (they had opened a London office and hence they marked their creations with the city's name, but they were all made in Switzerland). Leschot died in 1824, although he had previously retired years back.

Jacob Frisard is another key name in the history and development of this artifact. Born at Villeret (Switzerland) in 1753, served his horological apprenticeship in La Chaux-de-Fonds. Then, he settled in Geneva around 1784 where he worked for Pierre and Henri-Louis Jaquet-Droz and their associate Jean-Frédéric Leschot. He became a great master of singing bird technology, creating some of the most wonderful pieces sold by the Jaquet-Droz firm and contributing to their fame. His close collaboration with Leschot was to result in some of the most important technical innovations in the field; for instance, he was the inventor of the device which enable the bird to be fold back in the box once the song is finished and close the medallion or lid. Around 1800, he set up his own business and sought to show his creations to influential people, including Napoleon Bonaparte and organised an exhibition of his works in Zurich in 1809, but his efforts remained fruitless. In the early years of the 19th century, Frisard embarked on a series of journeys to exhibit his mechanical pieces throughout Europe, he eventually died in 1810 during the return journey to Geneva after a selling trip to Constantinople.

His particular expertise was in designing and cutting the cam sets needed to produce the bird song. He made cams which were arranged in a continuous spiral, so that no break occurred from the beginning of the bird's song to the end. This was a unique feature, never repeated by any other bird box manufacturer. He certainly made many, and possibly all, the cam sets used by the Jaquet-Droz and was also employed by Frères Rochat at the outset of their production.

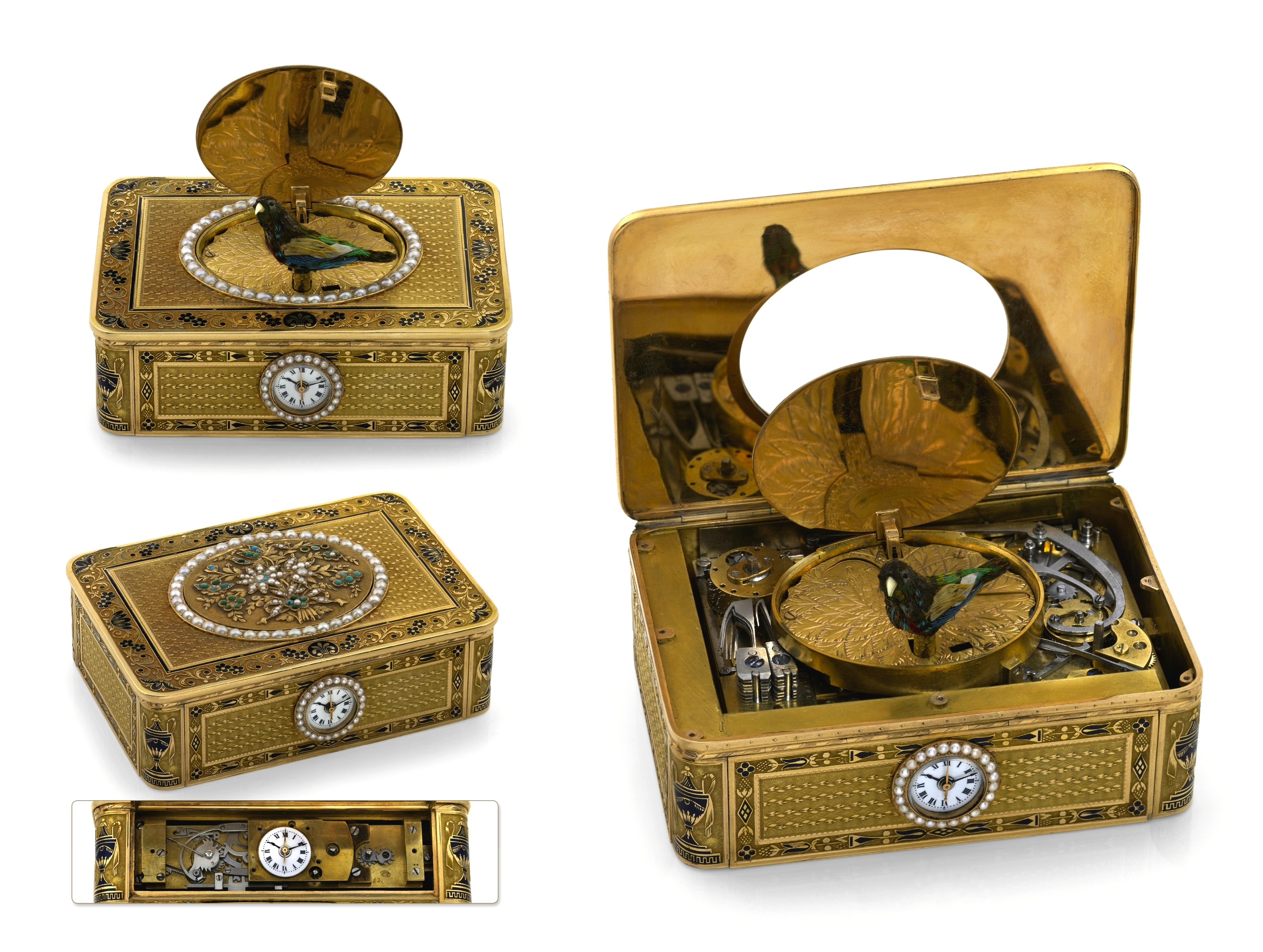
Frères Rochat work with independent musical movement and center-seconds, quarter-repeating watch, ca. 1820.

Frères Rochat (Brothers Rochat). These three brothers from Le Brassus in the Vallée de Joux were the sons of the master watchmaker David Rochat (1746–1812). They were: Jacques François Elisée Rochat, (1771–1836), David Frédéric Henri Rochat, (1774–1848) and Henri Samuel Rochat, (1777–1854). David Rochat formed an association with his three sons around 1800. At the end of the 18th and in the early years of the 19th century David Rochat and sons had furnished bird ébauches to Jaquet-Droz, and continued to do so when Jean-Frédéric Leschot took over the Jaquet-Droz firm following Henry-Louis death in 1792. In this they essentially followed the specifications given to them by Jacob Frisard, the singing bird specialist of Jaquet-Droz & Leschot. When Frisard, seeking to develop his own business became less available after 1800, Leschot sought to replace him with the Rochats, but this collaboration was short-lived.

In 1810, Leschot had virtually retired and Frisard had died, so it was left to Frères Rochat to continue to produce high-quality singing bird boxes in the tradition of Jaquet-Droz and so they did until 1849. After the death of their father, the three Rochat brothers moved to Geneva and went into business on their own account opening a shop in 1813. They worked there, in the Terreaux de Chantepoulet, until about 1820, when they split up into two groups. François remained on his own and continued in the Terreaux de Chantepoulet, later aided by his son Ami-Napoléon François (1807–1875), known as Ami. Frédéric and Samuel moved to the rue de Coutance 76, where they were subsequently aided by Frédéric's sons Antoine Auguste Frédéric (1799–1882) and Charles Louis François (1795–1862).

There were also other Rochats working in Geneva at the time. Among them is Louis Rochat, originally from l'Abbaye in the Vallée de Joux, who is considered to be the maker of a piece with clock and singing birds (today in the Peking Museum) which won a prize from the Genevan Réunion des Industriels in 1829. In 1814, Louis and his brother François formed an association along with Pierre Daniel Campiche, called Frères Rochat et Compagnie. To complicate matters, there were ties between the various Rochats. For example, Louis Rochat from l'Abbaye worked with Antoine (son of Frédéric) for a time, around 1850. It is however clear that the Rochat family produced many of the finest and most complex singing bird objects. They also built some of the smallest singing bird boxes ever made.

It should be said that in common with all the aforegoing makers, they did not concern themselves exclusively to this item, they also made other automata and mechanical devices.

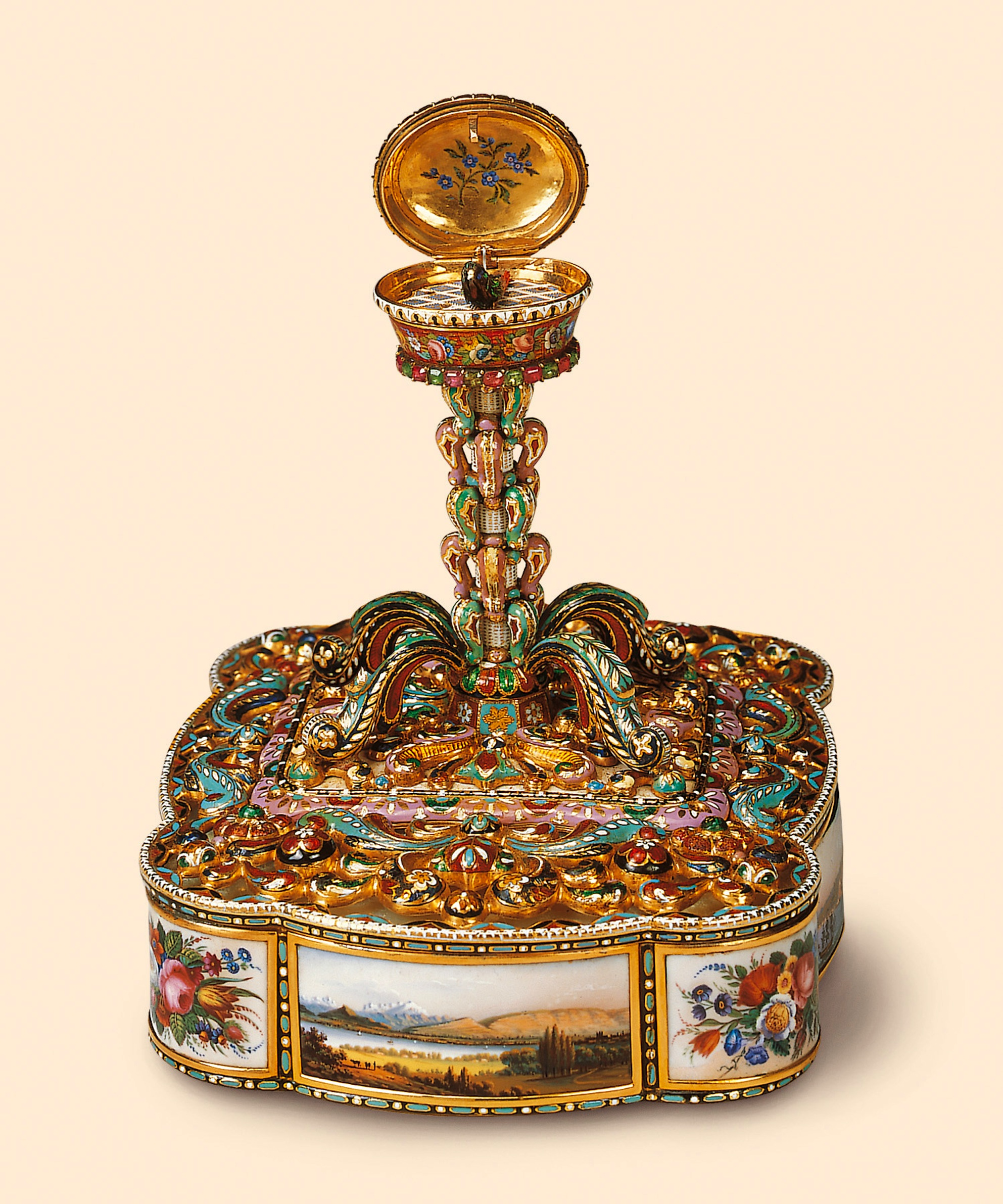
"Views of Switzerland", Charles Abraham Bruguier, enamel attributed to Louis Dufaux père, 1840s. Gold, marble, mother-of-pearl and painted on enamel, ruby and emerald-set musical singing bird box in the form of a paperweight.

Finally, the last of the great master mechanicians in the crafting of tabatières in the true tradition of the Jaquet-Droz, the also Swiss Bruguier family. Charles Abraham Bruguier was born in Geneva in 1788. He would gain great fame in the production of miniaturized songbird snuff boxes (he made other kinds of pieces as well), among his contributions are the improvements in the sound and the extension of the bird's performance, his movements, contained in richly decorated cases often by famous Genevan enamelists such as Richter, Dufey and Procchietto, were also distinguished for its quiet running.

From 1816 until 1822 he resided in London working on musical boxes and automata and it was during this period that his son also named Charles Abraham, was born in 1818. The family returned to Geneva in 1823, where Charles senior began to study the bird boxes of the time and to manufacture them, planning both improvements and methods to increase its production rate and therefore making this article to come within the reach of more people. Movements stamped "C. Bruguier à Geneve", followed by a three figure number, were produced up to about 1850. C. A. Bruguier father continued personally to repair singing birds up to 1861, one year before his death happened in 1862.

Charles-Abraham the younger (1818–1891) is first listed in the 1843 census as having a workshop independent of his father's. He continued to produce mechanisms that were very similar to those of his progenitor in quality and the same goes for his brother-in-law Jacques Bruguier (1801–1873) and the latter's son Jacques-Alexandre. These movements are sometimes marked but many remain unmarked and unnumbered. With the Bruguier family the golden age of the singing bird box (1785–1885) concludes. But this was not the end of it, thanks to the innovation and simplification of the movement carried out in France, made possible this piece of art to endure until the present.

All the above-mentioned Swiss renowned maestros employed a fusee-driven movement without exception. During the Jaquet-Droz/Leschot/Frisard period and in the early days of Rochat (up to about 1815) the detailed arrangement of the bird box movement underwent a series of changes, made to simplify operation and to ensure greater reliability, but in general, they did not affect the performance greatly. The exception was the ability of the automaton to turn its head from side to side, it is often affirmed that all early Swiss singing birds turn the head, but this is not true. After about 1820 the design and layout had settled down to a more or less standardized arrangement. With the end of the Rochat family business around 1850 and the death of Charles Bruguier father, virtually all innovative work on the fusee-wound movement ceased.

=== France: The "French Revolution" ===
During the second half of the nineteenth century until the beginning of World War I, Paris was the booming center of automata production worldwide and it is in this historical context that the Maison Bontems flourished. France took leadership in the construction of quality tabatières during the last quarter of the 19th century and early 20th century.

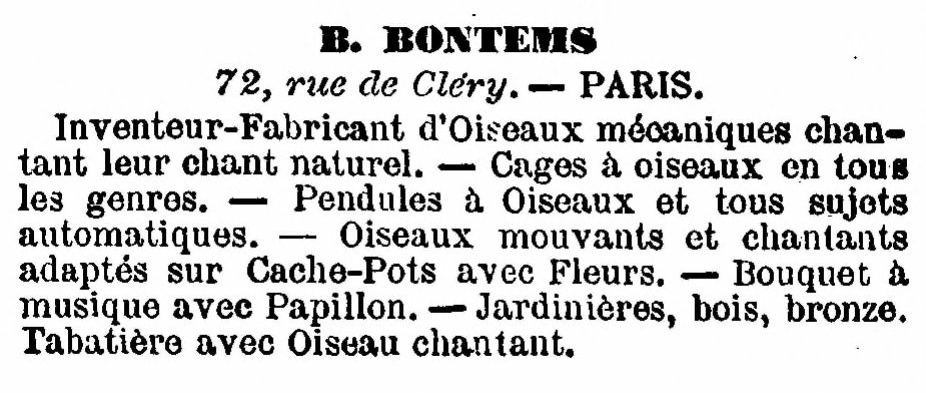
Blaise Bontems ad published in 1878. The last line reads: "Tabatière avec Oiseau chantant" (Snuffbox with singing bird). So by the 1870s he was already making them.

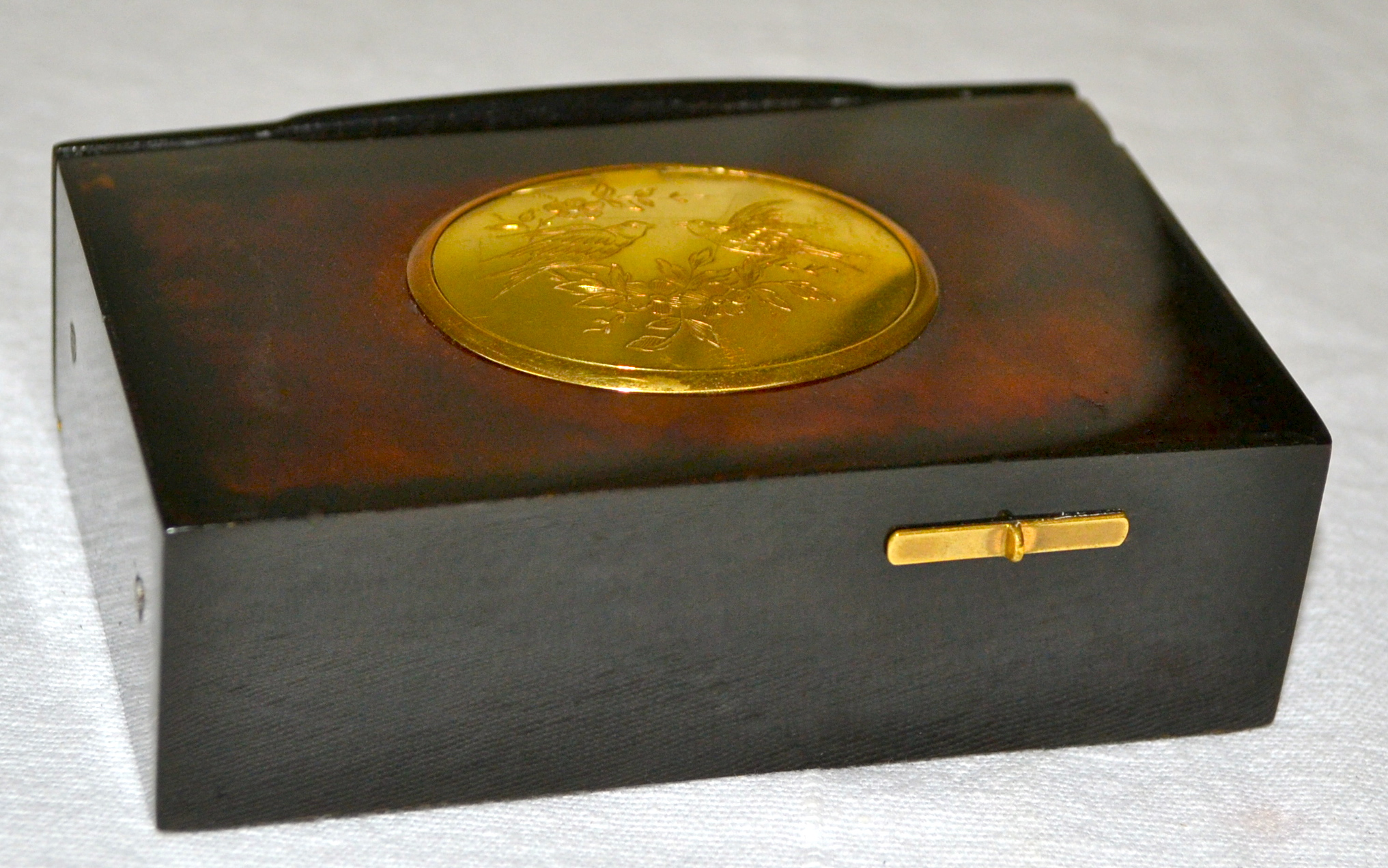
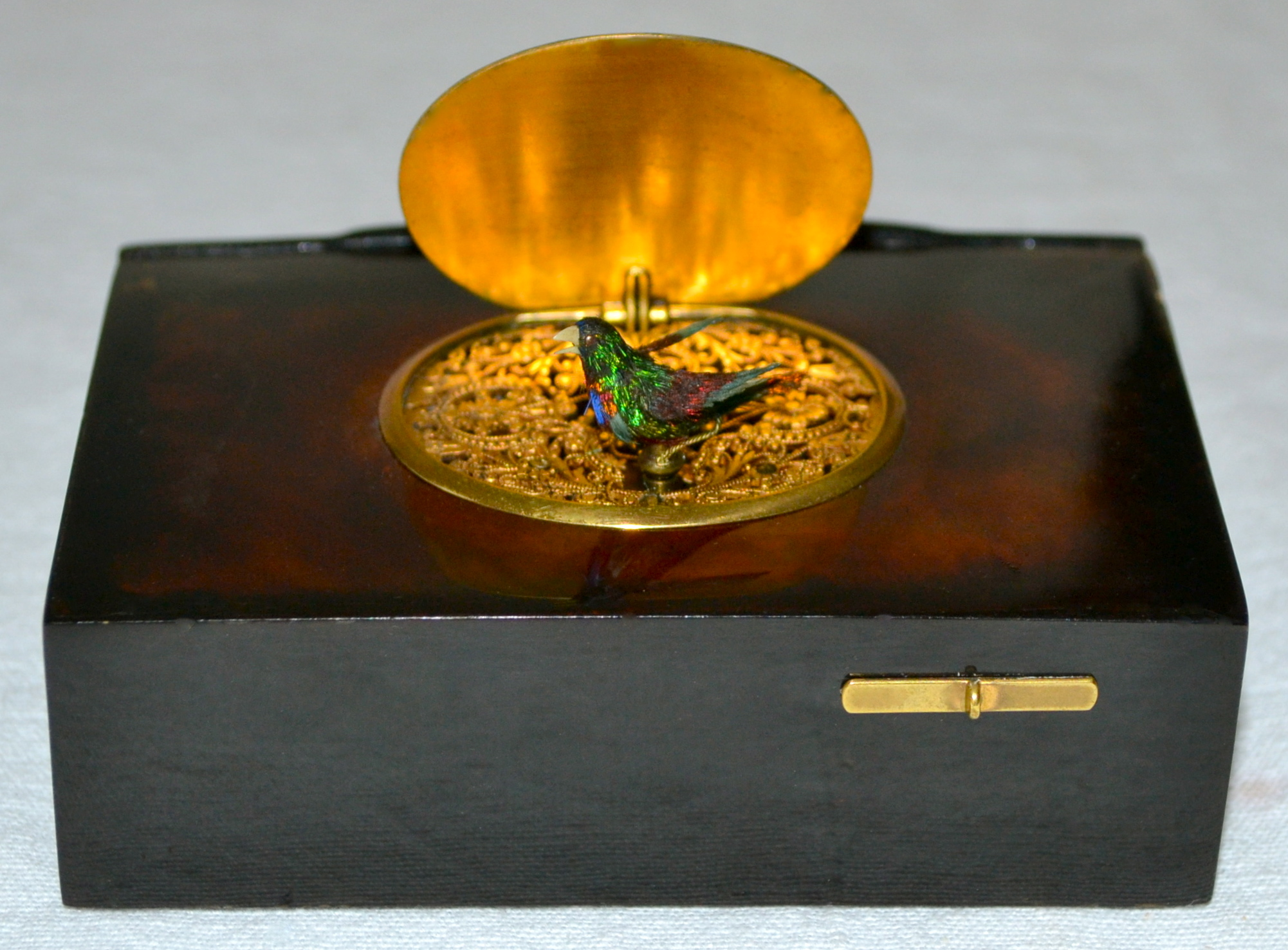
The model nº 11 by Bontems (the most popular of its range), c. 1890. Genuine tortoiseshell case with silver-gilt lid portraying a pair of hand-engraved birds and vegetal motifs. At right, the automaton is dressed with iridescent hummingbird feathers. Museo Cerralbo, Madrid, (Spain).

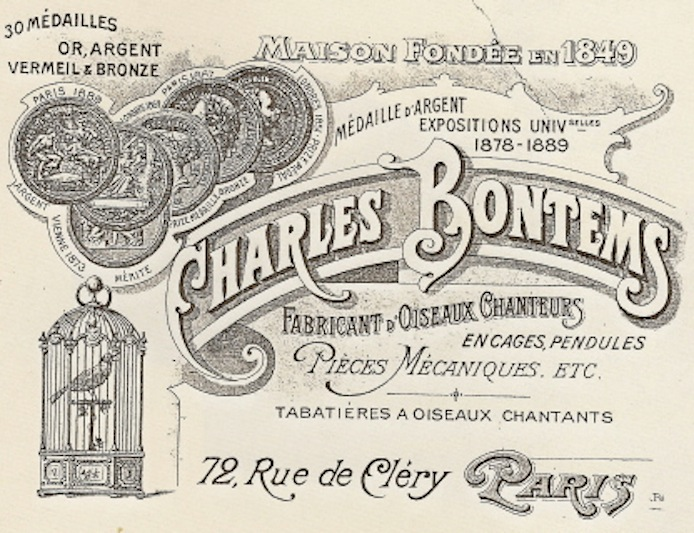
Charles Bontems label, c. 1890.

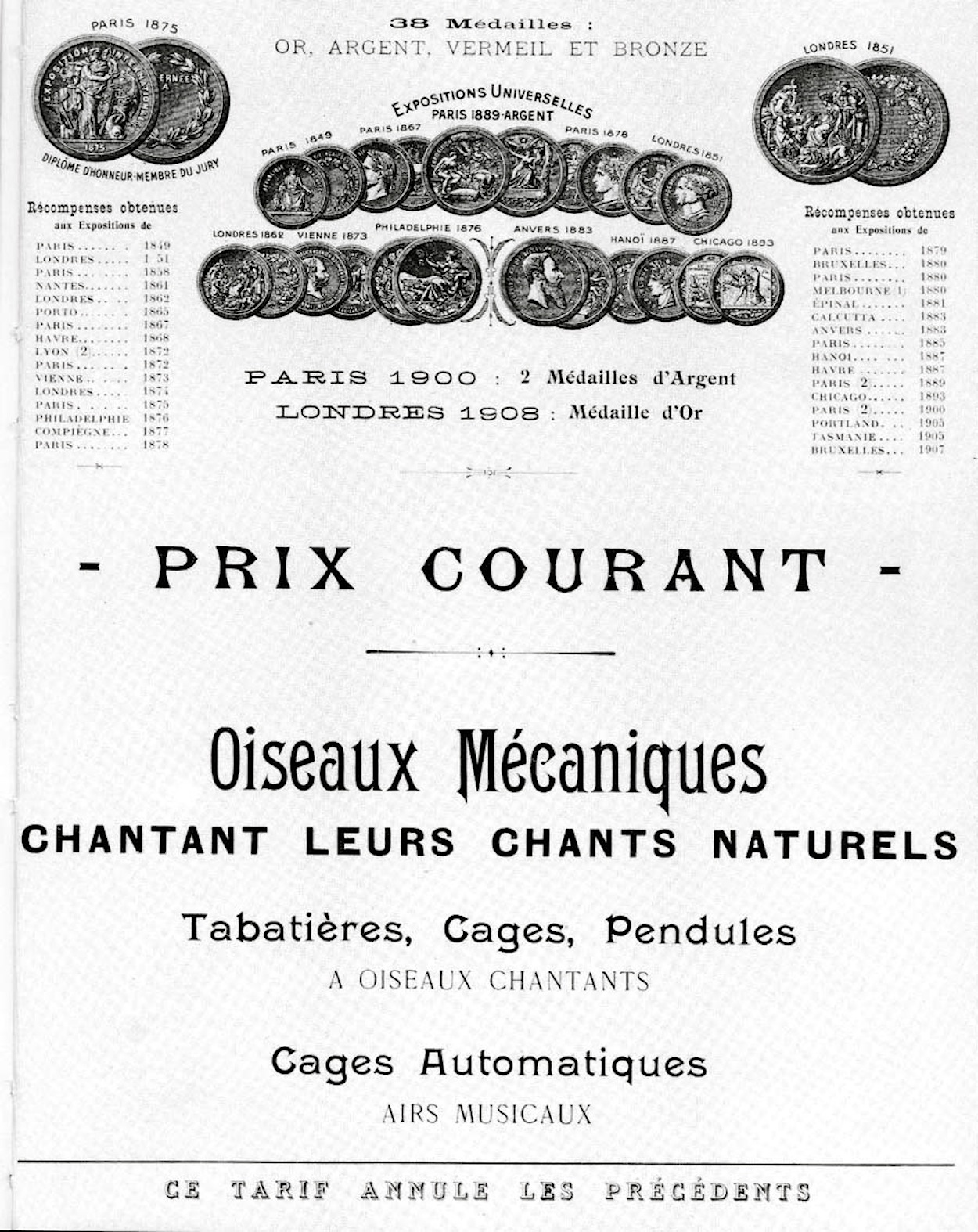
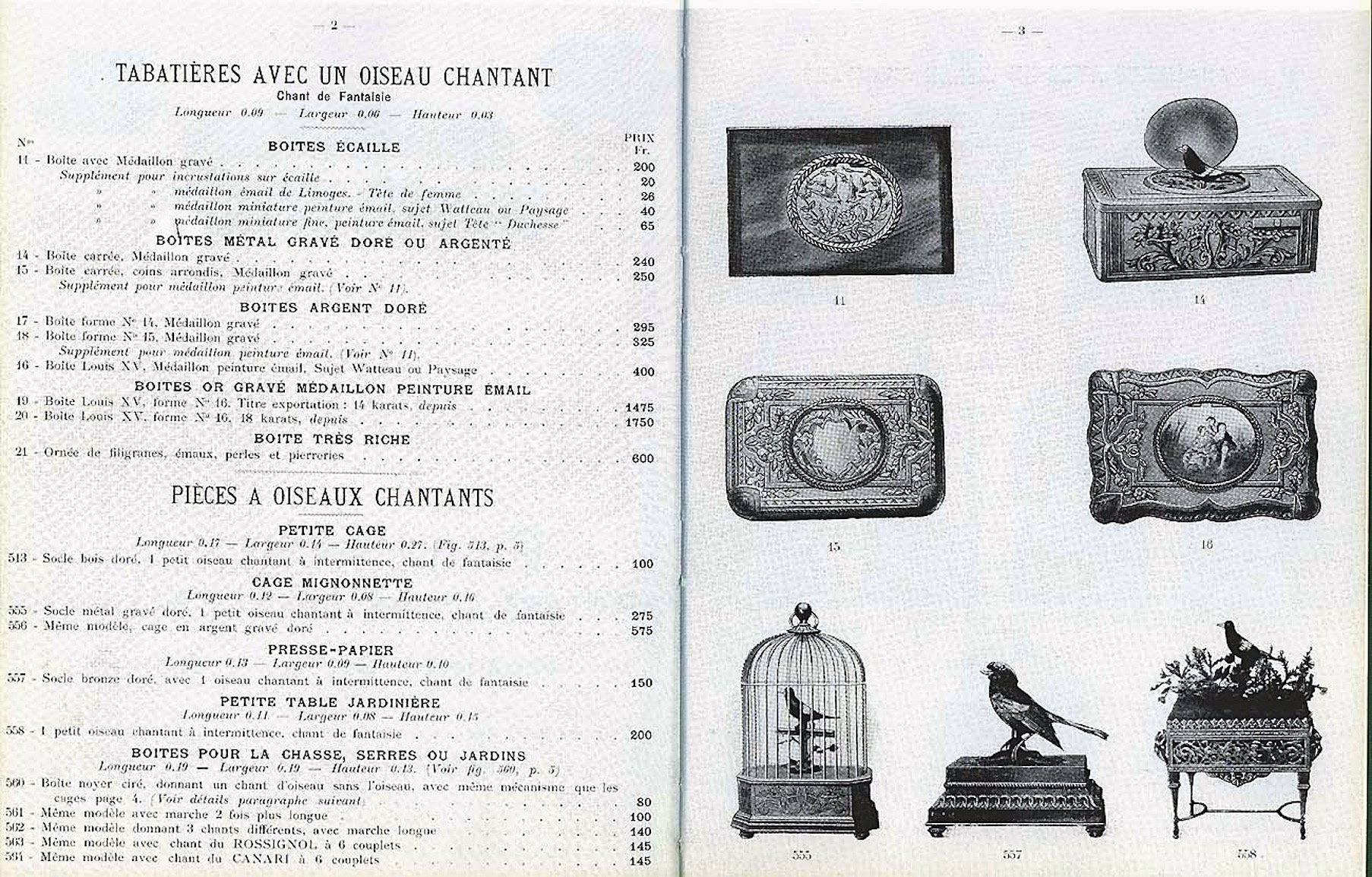
1910 Bontems catalogue. Left image; cover with awards and right image; pages showing prices and pictures.

In 1814 Blaise Bontems was born in the village of Le Ménil in France, he progressed to become a master clockmaker and in time one of the foremost producers specialized in mechanical birds and other automated animals. He was allegedly inspired to his craft while he was an apprentice clockmaker; when a customer brought in a musical snuffbox to be repaired. According to his biographers, Blaise Bontems was disappointed that the whistle was unnatural, so he modified the mechanism in such a way that it made a more realistic and authentic sound.

In 1849 he started his own business in Paris making singing birds which were exhibited at the 1851 London Exhibition. From available accounts it would appear that those birds were life-size and in cages. Sometime in the 1870s, they introduced their tabatières which resembled in external appearance to some of the Rochat and Bruguier models, but they had developed a completely different mechanism of entirely novel design. In 1893 Blaise Bontems died and the company passed to his son Charles Jules (b. 1848) and then to his grandson Lucien Bontems who died in 1956. Subsequently, it was acquired by Reuge S. A. of St Croix (Switzerland) in 1960 and this was their starting point in the singing bird box industry.

The extensive series of mechanical changes implemented by the reputed French house includes replacing the fusee motor employed by all the Swiss makers until then, by a simple going-barrel, the stack of eight song/air cams by just two and the parallel action bellows by a Vee-form bellows, the automaton internal mechanism was much simplified as well. This basic movement was to become pattern and standard for all succeeding makers up to the present.

Although the enterprise marked its automata and cage birds with its name and address using an oval stamp, no such identifying mark appears on its tabatières, although the earliest had a serial number. Identification rests mainly on the individual style of his movements and deep-bodied birds which does not turn their heads, showing (in common with those of Flajoulot) a bone or ivory beak.

Bontems can be regarded as the father of the modern singing bird box, after its simplification of the movement and improvements in the sound. A successful house lauded for the realistic quality of their songs, they exhibited in several Universal expositions and fairs where they were awarded with 43 medals of gold, silver, vermeil and bronze in Europe, the United States, Asia and Australia. They were suppliers "to Her Majesty the Queen of the United Kingdom", among others.

A well-adjusted Bontems movement with its bellows in good condition produces clear and pleasant bird-song for about fifteen seconds each performance. It is of simple and sturdy construction and in its day made ownership of a singing bird box possible to a wider public than any of its Swiss predecessors.

At this point, it must not be forgotten a cousin of the Bontems family, Alfred Bontems, a direct competitor who likewise worked in Paris. His singing bird pieces were almost identical to those of his relatives and the movements were supplied by them, although they were signed having stamped on the top plate the inscription "AB France". His company was in operation from around 1900 up to the 1950s.

Another Parisian maison is E. Flajoulot, which started to fabricate them for the first time around 1890 until the 1950s. He favoured metal boxes, heavily embossed and engraved in silver and silver gilt, some enamelled and with enamel pictures on the lids. His standard movement was well-made and, although owing much to Bontem's design, was not a simple replica of it. His movements have the added feature of an ingenious method of speed control and a stamped makers's name and serial number. He also seems to have introduced the idea of a start/stop pull rod and button on the right side of the box to replace the previously ubiquitous slider at the top right on the front of the box.

Lastly, Juvenia operated in France from around 1893, they produced several models being the most popular of its range a sarcophagus-form wooden case with hand painted country scenes and people dressed in the 18th century manner.

The intervention of the Parisian automata-makers in the history of this curiosity item no doubt resulted in a revolution. Many traditional features of the Swiss singing bird boxes were eliminated: The fusee in favor of a going-barrel, the lid slow-close wheel train, the longer song and in simplifying the bird's internal mechanism, the loss of head movement only took the automaton bird back to its origins. The work of Bontems, his contemporaries and successors preserve it for posterity in circumstances where, without them, it might have disappeared victim of an unstoppable and progressive industrialization.

=== England: A rara avis ===
The only English manufacturer of bird boxes was John Manger and Co., London, whose main activity was watchmaking (maker and importer). John Manger, listed as working in London from 1875 to 1881 in Brian Loome's Watchmakers and Clockmakers of the World, started to make them in 1878, he retired in 1899. The successor company, John Manger and Sons, London, was in operation during the early 20th century but did not reach the same level of quality as the earliest. They all fitted the Bontems type going-barrel movement.

=== Swiss makers of the first half of the 20th century ===
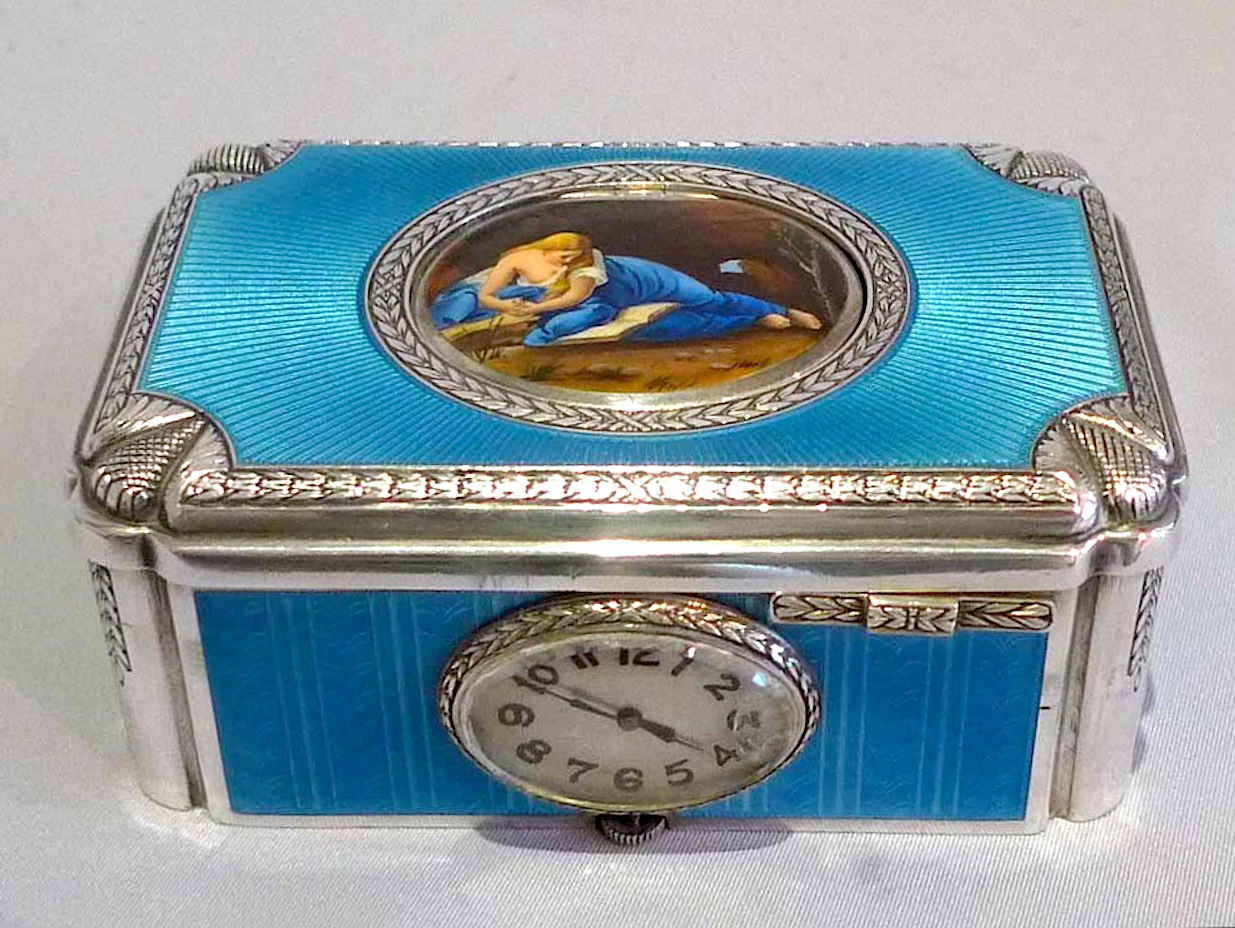
An electric blue guilloché enamel case with incorporated watch. Raymy, c. 1925. The lid decorated with "The Penitent Magdalene" after a painting by Pompeo Girolamo Batoni.

According to the already cited authors Alfred Chapuis & Édouard Gélis, three manufacturers were active in Geneva in 1928: F. Cattelin, Marguerat and A. Salmon. C. H. Marguerat – Manufacture d'Oiseaux Chantant, Avenue de la Gare des Eux Vives 18, Genève – is the best known of the three, though their movements are not always marked. Charles-Armand Marguerat (1887-1931) is noted for rectangular boxes with a small round timepiece mounted on two pillars above the box. The clock mechanism can be set to trigger the bird box in the same way as an alarm, or the box may be played independently. Other Marguerat's boxes are very often oval in shape, but use a conventional movement trimmed off at the corners. The movement employed is very similar to Bontems', but - as with Flajoulot - the governor for speed control is a departure and might have derived from Flajoulot's design. In general, Marguerat mechanisms were well made and particularly the enamelled cases are of very good quality for the epoch.

Of the other two makers, in the pieces by Antoine Salmon (c. 1876 – 1951) the enamel work is often of a very good quality as well. He was originally French but had settled early on in Geneva. Very few of his bird boxes are known to be signed. And finally F. Cattelin, it is not really clear if he ever fabricated them, although may be possible that he was responsible for some of the perfectly made good anonymous boxes which are far from uncommon.

Another Genevan maker was Raymy, who worked from around 1903, but such was his workshops' lack of records, advertising or prominence, that dating his products is rather speculative. He is known for his well constructed boxes, some with an oval watch and guilloché enamel. The usual stamp of OMM within a windmill frame are always seen on Raymy's movements, with the earlier ones carrying the initial L.M.G.. It is thought to be the same Swiss manufacturer for these two supposedly different brand names, because of the obvious similarities between their respective movements.

All these firms bear in common the using of the Bontems type going-barrel movement contained inside generally beautifully crafted cases in various materials which incorporated, with relative frequency, a timepiece during the interwar period (1920s and 1930s). They are distinguished by favouring the use of the guilloché enamel technique too.

=== Germany: An affordable article ===
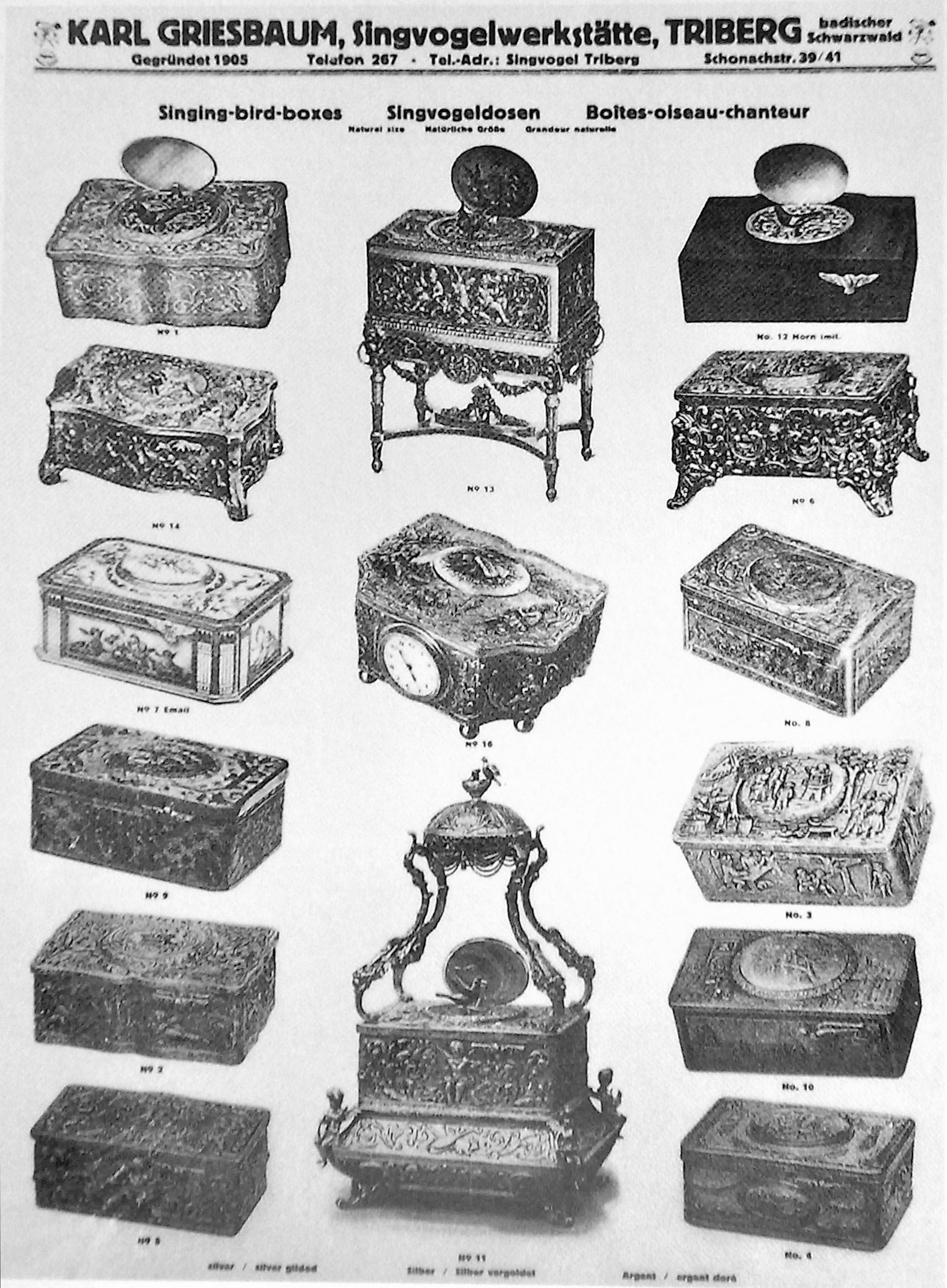
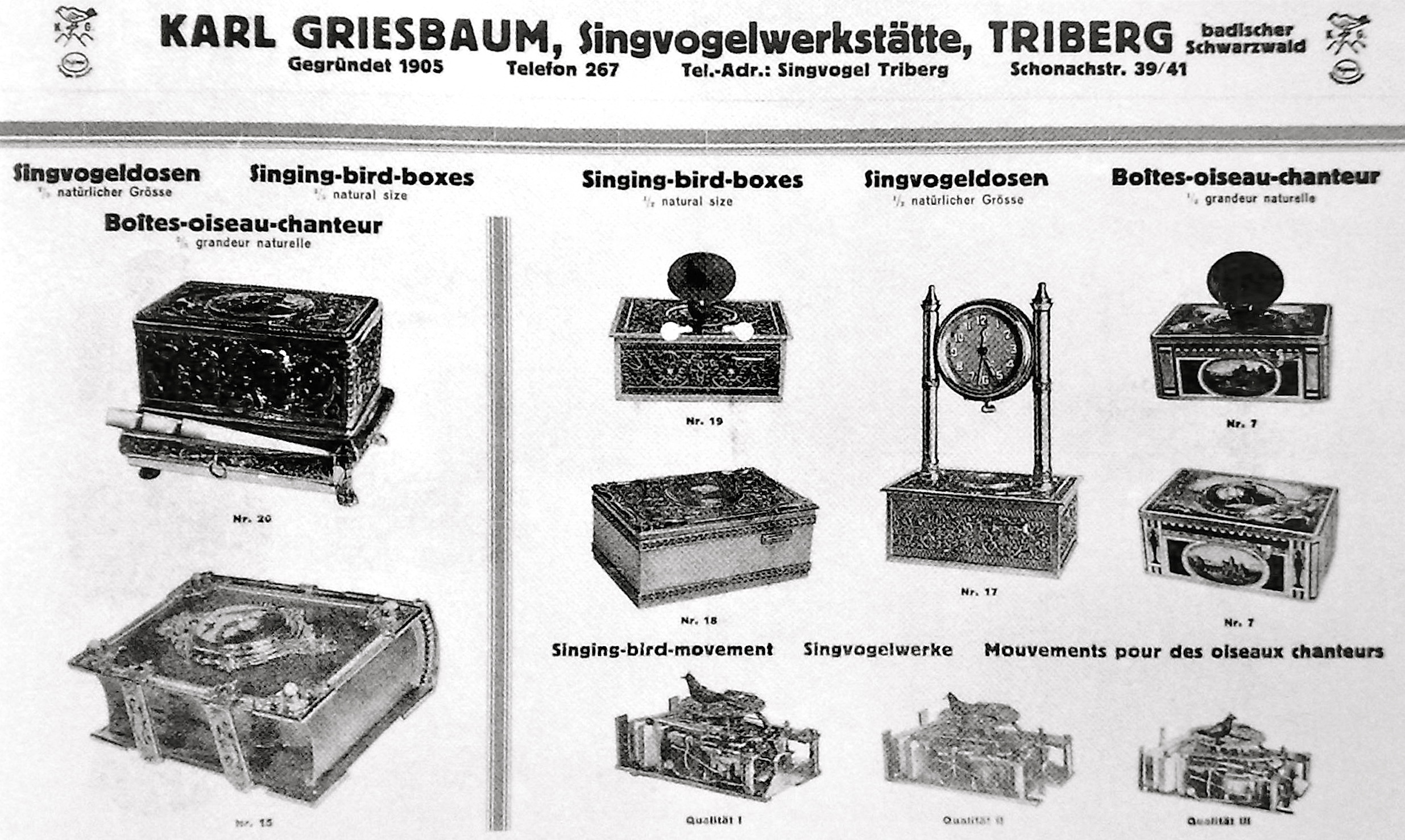
Two posters of 1930 showing Karl Griesbaum range of bird boxes. Right below, can be seen the movements offered in three build qualities.

Tabatiéres of the Bontems style were produced with the mark of C. K. Lamy of Furtwangen in the Black Forest. In his book Mechanische Singvögel, Peter Schuhknecht traces the history of the firm to its closing in 1927. Little is known of its range, but the few examples seen have been housed in well enamelled silver boxes and have birds with bone beaks. The movement is basically a copy of Bontems.

For six years between 1922 and 1928 the company Eschle appeared briefly in Triberg (also in the Black Forest), fabricating bird boxes. In 1950, two brothers, Robert and Otto Eschle, sons of the original founder, resumed the business which survived until 1977 when it was purchased by Reuge as well. Their cases were very similar to those of Griesbaum, but as they both marked their respective products with their names or symbols, they can be easily identified. Eschle products were sold cheaply in souvenir shops in the Black Forest and their movements had the key for winding screwed onto the barrel arbor.

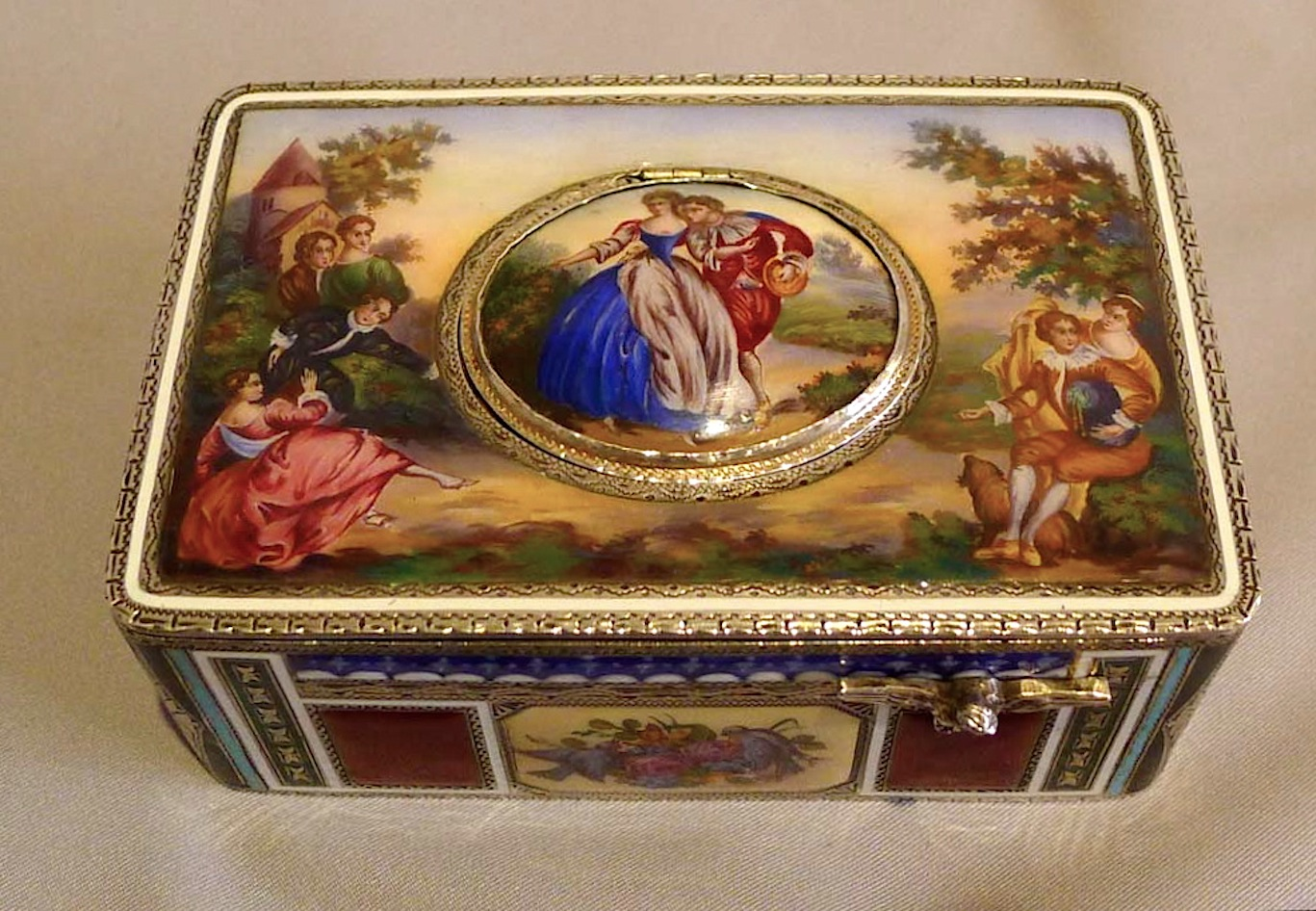
Model nº 7, was one of Griesbaum's most expensive enamelled silver cases, c. 1930.

Nevertheless, the only company of the twentieth century to dominate the manufacture of bird boxes for more than 50 years with an output exceeding all others put together, was certainly the prolific firm of Karl Griesbaum (1872–1941).

Founded in 1905 also in Triberg, they originally made clock parts and in 1920 they embarked on the production of singing bird boxes until its closure in 1988. During the course of its lifetime the cases were supplied to them in a variety of over thirty different styles, some based on previous models by Rochat, Bruguier, etc., while others displayed novelty designs not seen before.

Within all these cases there was only one song and one type of movement available, but this mechanism (closely modelled on the Bontems pattern) was offered in three build qualities which were first introduced between 1922 and 1925. According to a list price of 1930 it was available in: 1 Finely finished and polished with steel springs. 2 Solid finish, unpolished, with brass springs. 3 Lightly made an unpolished (special construction). There was no audible difference between these three versions, so most of Griesbaum boxes were fitted with the cheapest movement.

Following the cessation of activity in 1988, the contents of the Griesbaum workshops were purchased by Siegfried Wendel who moved the production to Rüdesheim am Rhein (Germany) setting up MMM (Mechanische Musikwerke Manufaktur) GmbH in 1990. In 1993 they resumed the making of singing bird boxes in the tradition of Griesbaum.

=== Twenty-first century ===
The only remaining makers that produce this article in Europe are the abovementioned Reuge (Switzerland) and MMM (Germany).

A company by the name of Frères Rochat was established in 2010 in Switzerland and retook, after 125 years since its interruption around 1885, the fabrication of both the fusee-driven movement and the bird's head motions. Its first two models were launched in 2013. In 2016 was acquired by Reuge, and production seems to have stopped.

== Collecting ==
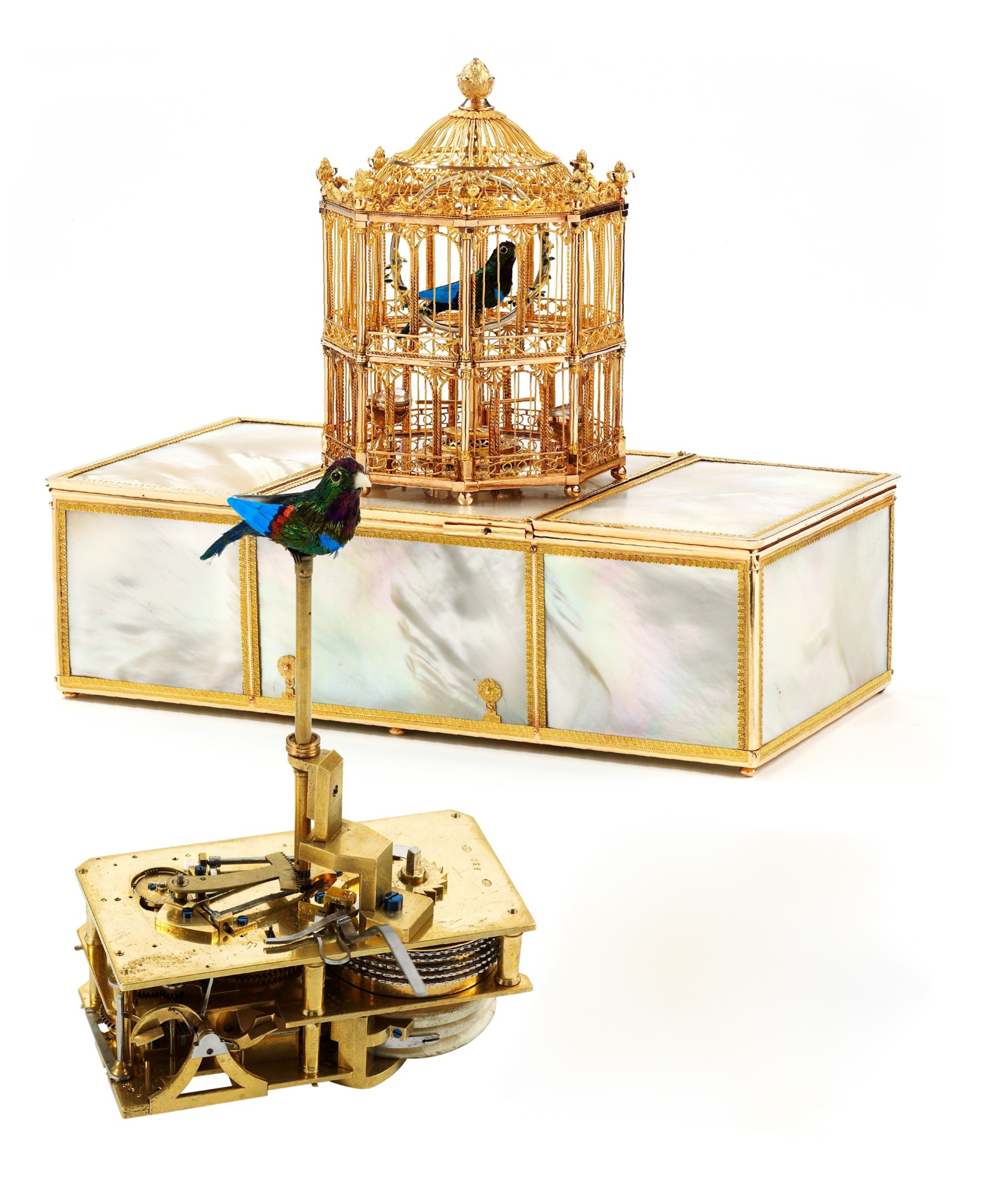
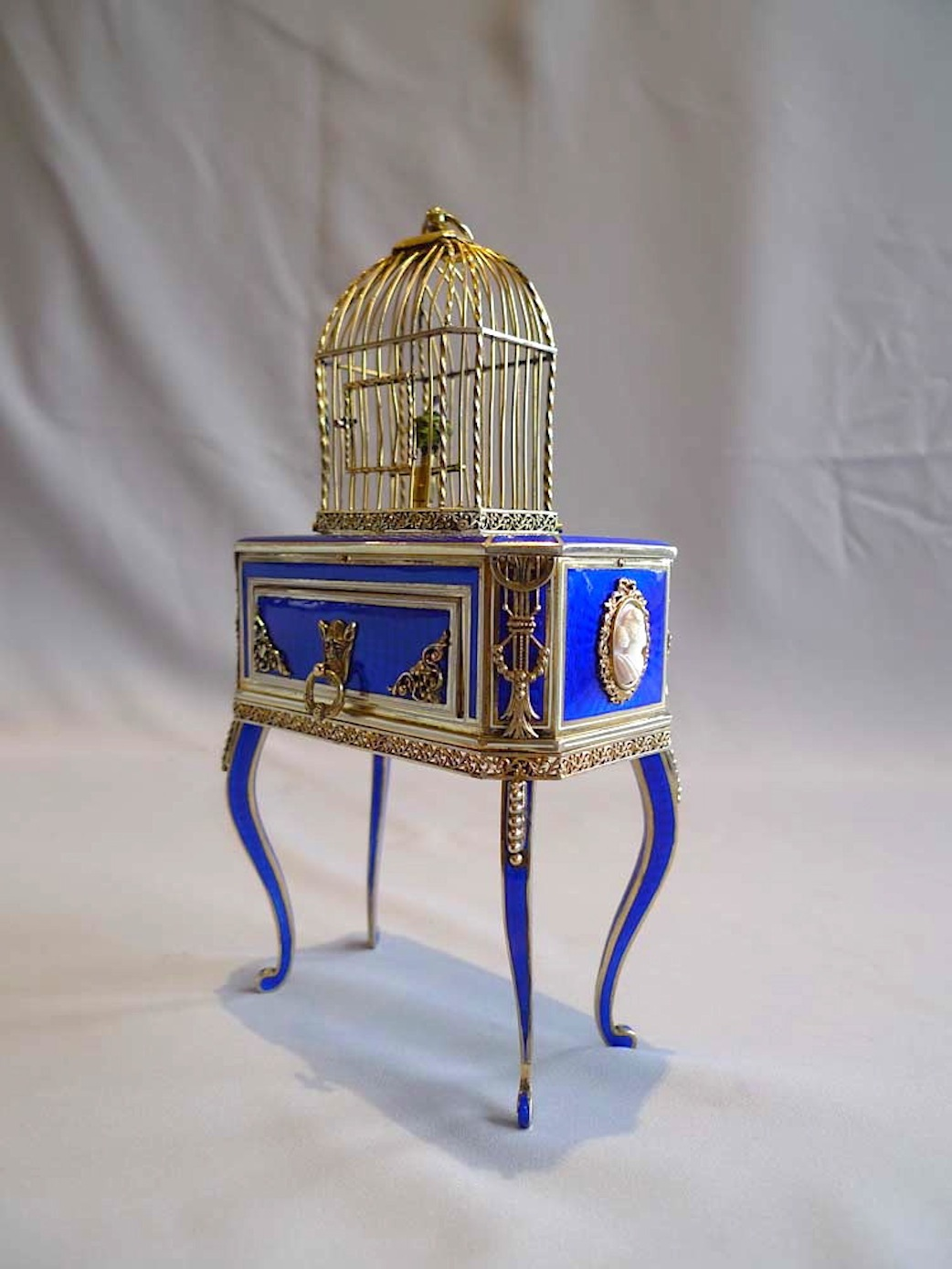
Left: A piece in mother-of-pearl case by Frères Rochat, ca. 1810. It is also a jewellery box. By tradition, once belonged to Empress Josephine Bonaparte of France. Right: An experimental prototype by Griesbaum in the shape of a writing desk with blue guilloché enamel and ivory cameos. Never went into production, early 1920s.

For over 225 years of uninterrupted fabrication, this small objet de vertu has captivated generations of people of all paths and walks of life, from kings and aristocrats to bourgeoises, middle-class people, etc. Many feel particularly fascinated by its purely mechanical operating intricate movement, without any electronic component. Others may prefer the cases' artistic and aesthetic values with a wide variety of designs to collect.

It has become a collector's item, especially those by the Swiss Jaquet-Droz & Leschot, Jacob Frisard, Frères Rochat, or the Bruguier family.

When purchasing or appraising, several aspects must be taken into account, basically four; the manufacturer, the condition, the quality of whistle and the case. With regard to the case, its design, craftsmanship, decorative techniques used (e. g. guilloché enamel, hand painted scenes in the lid, etc.), type of material used; precious metals, ivory, mother of pearl, tortoiseshell, etc. As for the bird, a discerning point is the complexity of the melody and quality of sound, its general appearance, type of feathers (for instance, iridescent real hummingbird feathers), the beak; ivory or bone versus metal or plastic, the proportions of the minute avis body, etc. Another issue is the rarity or singularity of a certain piece, for example if it has an added complication such as two automata instead of one, a musical movement and/or a timepiece, etc.

Collectors must beware with fakes, because in some cases pieces of older boxes are cobbled together to claim the object is "original". In particular, because MMM uses many of the same techniques, parts and casemakers, new MMM boxes are often sold as antique Griesbaum boxes by some dealers and auction houses. If any singing bird box is described as antique, it is advisable to insist on seeing a photograph of the mechanical movement - no different from inspecting the movement on a fine watch. Other dishonest practices include smearing glitter glue on the birds in an attempt to make the feathers look like iridescent hummingbird feathers, which destroys the value of the piece.

== In the media ==
Singing bird boxes have been featured in several TV shows:

- Little House on the Prairie, season 5, episode 99, "The Wedding" (1978).
- Antiques Roadshow (U.S.), season 16, episode 27 (1997).
- Antiques Roadshow (UK) series 27, episode 22 (2005).
- How It's Made, season 13, episode 7, "Pressure Cookers/Mechanical Singing Birds/Oceanographic Buoys/Stainless-Steel Tank Trailers (2009).
- Storage Wars, season 2, episode 8, "San Burrito" (2011).
- Mechanical Marvels: Clockwork Dreams (2013).

== See also ==
- Savart wheel

== Bibliography ==
- Mayson, Geoffrey T. (2000). Mechanical Singing-Bird Tabatières.
- Bailly, Sharon & Christian (2001). Flights of Fancy - Mechanical Singing Birds.
